= Bukhari =

Bukhari or Bokhari (بخاری) means "from Bukhara (Uzbekistan)" in Persian, Arabic, Urdu and Hebrew, and may refer to:

== People ==
- al-Bukhari (810–870), Islamic hadith scholar and author of the Sahih al-Bukhari
- Muhammad al-Bukhari bin Uthman dan Fodio (1785–1840), Sokoto poet, military leader, and son of Usman dan Fodio.
- Bukhari Daud (1959–2021), Indonesian academic and regent of Aceh Besar

== Books ==
- Sahih al-Bukhari (9th century), one of the two most authoritative hadith collections in Sunni Islam
- Sahih Al-Bukhari: The Early Years of Islam, translation and explanation of Sahih al-Bukhari by Muhammad Asad

== Language ==
- Bukhari or Bukhori language, Judeo-Tajik dialect historically spoken by Jews from Bukhara (Uzbekistan)

== Tools ==
- Bukhari (heater), a type of space heater from North India and Pakistan

== Other uses ==
- Bukhari (surname), a nisba and surname (including a list of people with this name)
- Bukharan Jews
- Emirate of Bukhara

== See also ==
- Bukhara (disambiguation)
- Bukharin
