= Islam at the Crossroads =

Book by Muhammad Asad

- Author: Muhammad Asad
- Language: English
- Subjects: Politics, Religion, Muslim world
- Publisher: Arafat Publications
- Publication date: 1934
- Publication place: Pakistan, India
- Media type: Print (Hardcover, Paperback)
- Pages: 105 pp
- ISBN: 9789839541045

Islam at the Crossroads is a book written by Muhammad Asad. The book originally published in Delhi and Lahore in 1934, and was later reprinted by Dar Al-Andulas in 1982 with an additional note by the author.

The book is basically a plea to Muslims to avoid blind imitation of Western social forms and values, and to try to preserve instead their Islamic heritage which once upon a time had been responsible for the glorious, many-sided historical phenomenon comprised in the term "Muslim civilization". Asad dedicates the book to "the Muslim youth of today in hopes that it may be of benefit."

== See also ==
- Timeline of Muhammad Asad's life
- The Message of The Qur'an
- The Road to Mecca
- This Law of Ours and Other Essays
- The Principles of State and Government in Islam
