= Sahih Al-Bukhari: The Early Years of Islam =

1938 book by Muhammad Asad

- Author: Muhammad Asad
- Language: English
- Subject: Hadith, Islam, Translation
- Genre: mystery
- Published: 1938 (Dar Al Andalus)
- Publication place: Pakistan
- Media type: Print (Hardcover, Paperback)
- Pages: 306 pp
- ISBN: 9789839154450

Sahih al-Bukhari: The Early Years of Islam is the exegesis of Sahih al-Bukhari, the first book of the Six Books of Sunni Islam, by Muslim polymath Muhammad Asad.

The book comprises the historical chapters of the most important compilations of Traditions, the Sahih of al-Bukhari. It depicts the beginning of the Prophet's revelation, the merits of his Companions and the early years of Islam up to and including the decisive turning point of Islamic history, the Battle of Badr.

== Background ==
After his book Islam at the Crossroads, Asad focused his attention on one of the earliest and most enduring of his concerns as a reformer: "to make real the voice of the Prophet of Islam—real, as if he were speaking directly to us and for us: and it is in the Hadith that his voice can be most clearly heard." Like other Islamic reformers, Asad thought that knowledge of the traditions—the carefully collected and recorded sayings of the Prophet, which complement and amplify the Qur'an—was necessary for "a new understanding and a direct appreciation of the true teachings of Islam".

With the encouragement of poet-philosopher Iqbal, he attempted a task that had never been undertaken before in English: the translation and explanation the Prophet's authentic traditions as they had been carefully and critically compiled in the ninth century by the traditionalist al-Bukhari.

== Prefaces ==
=== Preface to 1938 Edition ===
The author had planned to gradually translate and annotate the entire Sahih al-Bukhari and publish it in forty installments. He had completed translation of about thirty chapters. Out of these, two chapters were printed in Srinagar, three chapters were printed in Lahore. The un-printed manuscript of the rest of the chapters got destroyed due to the violent partition of Indian Subcontinent. The 1938 edition is a collection of those five printed installments in book form.

=== Preface to 1981 Edition ===
The start of the Second World War saw Asad interned by the British Government as an enemy alien; his work on Sahih al-Bukhari continued in the internment. Soon after the war ended, the bloody disorder which accompanied the Partition of India (1947) came as a "great personal loss" to Asad. Along with his other works, nearly three-quarters of the manuscripts of his annotated translation of Sahih al-Bukhari were destroyed. This 1981 edition is a republication of 1938 edition, and carries the remnants of that destroyed work.

== See also ==
- The Message of The Qur'an
- Timeline of Muhammad Asad's life
- The Road to Mecca
- Kutub al-Sittah
- Hadith terminology
