= Worship =

Act of religious devotion

Worship is an act of religious devotion usually directed towards a deity, spirit, or other supernatural entity. For many, worship is not about an emotion, but rather about the recognition of the object of worship. An act of worship may be performed individually, in an informal or formal group, or by a designated leader. Such acts may involve honoring.

== Etymology ==
The word is derived from the Old English weorþscipe, meaning to venerate "worship, honour shown to an object or deity, which has been etymologised as "worthiness or worth-ship"—to give, at its simplest, worth to something.

== Types ==
- Ancestor worship
- Animal worship
- Imperial cult
- Nature worship
- Pole worship

== In various religions ==
=== Buddhism ===
Worship in Buddhism may take innumerable forms given the doctrine of skillful means. Worship is evident in Buddhism in such forms as: okāsa recitation, paritta chanting, liturgy, guru yoga, mandala, the discipline of the fighting monks of Shaolin, mantra recitation, tea ceremony, amongst others. Buddhist devotion is an important part of the practice of most Buddhists. According to a spokesman of the Sasana Council of Burma, devotion to Buddhist spiritual practices inspires devotion to the Triple Gem. Most Buddhists use ceremonies in pursuit of their spiritual aspirations. In Buddhism, puja (Sanskrit and Pali: pūjā) are expressions of "honour, worship and devotional attention" Acts of puja include bowing, making offerings and chanting. These devotional acts are generally performed daily at home (either in the morning or evening or both) as well as during communal festivals and Uposatha days at a temple.

Meditation (samādhi) is a central form of worship in Buddhism. This practice is focused on the third step of the Eightfold Path that ultimately leads to self awakening, also known as enlightenment. Meditation promotes self-awareness and exploration of the mind and spirit. Traditionally, Buddhist meditation had combined samatha (the act of stopping and calming oneself) and vipasyana (seeing clearly within) to create a complete mind and body experience. By stopping one's everyday activities and focusing on something simple, the mind can open and expand enough to reach a spiritual level. By practicing the step of vipasyana, one does not achieve the final stage of awareness, but rather approaches one step closer. Mindful meditation teaches one to stop reacting quickly to thoughts and external objects that present themselves, but rather to peacefully hold the thought without immediately responding to it. Although in traditional Buddhist faith, enlightenment is the desired end goal of meditation, it is more of a cycle in a literal sense that helps individuals better understand their minds. For example, meditation leads to understanding, leading to kindness, leading to peace, etc.

=== Christianity ===
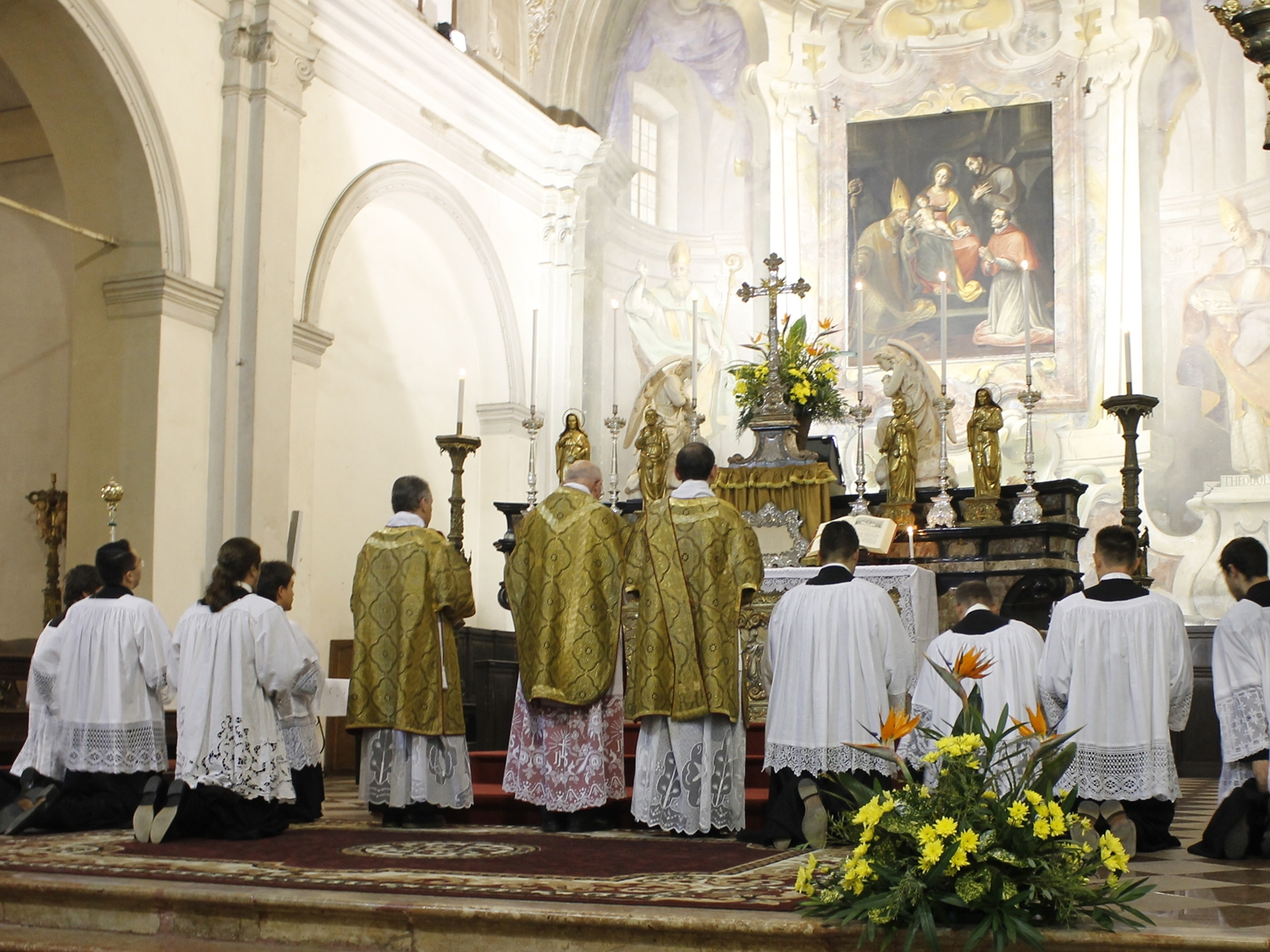
Worship during the liturgy of the Holy Mass in Italy

In Christianity, a church service is a formalized period of communal worship, often but not exclusively occurring on Sunday (or on Saturday in the case of those churches practicing seventh-day Sabbatarianism). The church service is the gathering together of Christians to be taught the "Word of God" (the Holy Bible) and encouraged in their faith. Technically, the "church" in "church service" refers to the gathering of the faithful rather than to the building in which the event takes place. In Christianity, worship is reverent honor and homage paid to God. The New Testament uses various words to express the concept of worship. The word proskuneo - "to worship" - means to bow down (to Gods or to kings).

Mass is the central act of divine worship in the Catholic Church. The Congregation for Divine Worship at the Vatican publishes a Directory on Popular Piety and the Liturgy. Catholic devotions are "external practices of piety" which are not part of the official liturgy of the Catholic Church but part of the popular spiritual practices of Catholics. They do not become part of liturgical worship, even if conducted in a Catholic church, in a group, in presence of a priest.

Anglican devotions is private prayers and practices used by Anglican Christians to promote spiritual growth and communion with God. Among members of the Anglican Communion, private devotional habits vary widely, depending on personal preference and on affiliation with low-church or high-church parishes.

Quakers (the Religious Society of Friends) have both unprogrammed and programmed meetings for worship. Unprogrammed worship is based on silence and inward listening to the Spirit, from which any participant may share a message. In unprogrammed meetings for worship, someone speaks when that person feels that God/Spirit/the universe has given them a message for others. Programmed worship includes many elements similar to Protestant services. Many programmed meetings also include a time during the service for silent, expectant waiting and messages from the participants. During the silence, people may stand up and Minister, this is where people start talking about what they have been thinking about. It is Quaker practice to only minister once.

=== Hinduism ===
Worship in Hinduism involves invoking higher forces to assist in spiritual and material progress and is simultaneously both a science and an art. A sense of bhakti or devotional love is generally invoked. This term is probably a central one in Hinduism. A direct translation from the Sanskrit to English is problematic. Worship takes a multitude of forms depending on community groups, geography and language. There is a flavour of loving and being in love with whatever object or focus of devotion. Worship is not confined to any place of worship, it also incorporates personal reflection, art forms and group. People usually perform worship to achieve some specific end or to integrate the body, the mind and the spirit in order to help the performer evolve into a higher being.

=== Islam ===
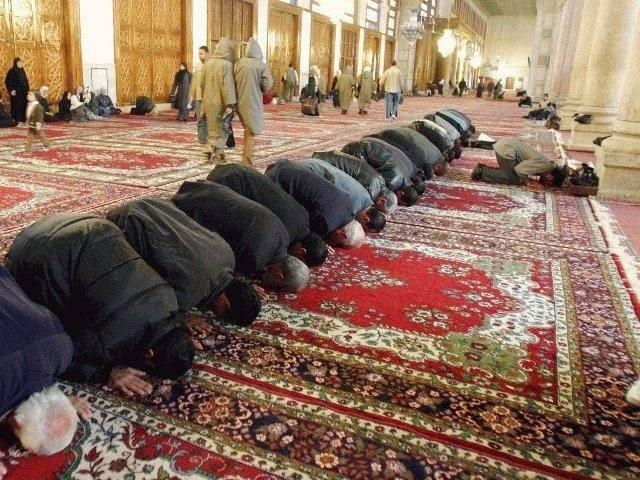
In Islam, Sujud (prostrations) occupy a quintessential position in the five obligatory daily formal prayers.

In Islam, worship refers to ritualistic devotion as well as actions done in accordance to Islamic law which is ordained by and pleasing to God. Worship included in the Five Pillars of Islam, primarily that of salat, which is the practice of ritual prayer five times daily.

According to Muhammad Asad, on his notes in The Message of the Qur'an translation on Q51:56,

Thus, the innermost purpose of the creation of all rational beings is their cognition of the existence of Allah and, hence, their conscious willingness to conform their own existence to whatever they may perceive of His will and plan: and it is this twofold concept of cognition and willingness that gives the deepest meaning to what the Quran describes as "worship". As the next verse shows, this spiritual call does not arise from any supposed "need" on the part of the Creator, who is self-sufficient and infinite in His power, but is designed as an instrument for the inner development of the worshipper, who, by the act of his conscious self-surrender to the all-pervading Creative Will, may hope to come closer to an understanding of that Will and, thus closer to Allah Himself.

In the Muslim world, the word worship (in the literal context of worshipping) is forbidden to be used if it refers to an object or action and not exclusively to Allah.

=== Judaism ===
Worship of God in Judaism is called Avodat Hashem. During the period when the Temple stood, the rites conducted there were considered the most important act of Jewish worship. However, the most common form of worship was and remains that of prayer. Other forms of worship include the conduct of prescribed rituals, such as the Passover Seder and waving the Four Species, with proper intent, as well as various types of Jewish meditation.

Rabbi Nachman of Breslov noted that there are two kinds of Jewish worship. People settled in society typically worship in a calm manner whereas people who do not feel settled in society typically worship in an ecstatic manner. In some ways, this dichotomy reflected the Jewish denominations of the era, but in other ways, Rabbi Nachman was speaking about how each person relates with God.

Jewish sources also express the notion that one can perform any appropriate mundane activity as the worship of God. Examples would include returning a lost article and working to support oneself and one's family. The Code of Jewish Law (Orach Chayim, Chapter 231) cites Proverbs (3:6), "in all your ways, know him" (Hebrew: בכל דרכיך דעהו (b'chol d'rachecha dei'eihu)), as a biblical source for this idea.

=== Sikhism ===
In Sikhism, worship takes place after the Guru Granth Sahib, which is the work of the 10 Sikh Gurus all in one. Sikhs worship God and only one God, known as "One Creator", "The Wonderful Teacher" (Waheguru), or "Destroyer of Darkness".

=== Wicca ===
Wiccan worship commonly takes place during a full moon or a new moon. Such rituals are called an Esbat and may involve a magic circle which practitioners believe will contain energy and form a sacred space, or will provide them a form of magical protection.

=== Zoroastrianism ===
Prayer is one of the duties and worships of Mazdayasna, which is performed in order to always pay attention to the religious commandments and to give thanks to Ahura Mazda (God).

=== Vaudou ===
Worship of voodoo is a cult of the spirit of the invisible world. This type of worship is inherited from ancestors of Ewe people like Adja-ewe, fon, Kotafon, Guin and Mina. Voodoo or vaudou is a spiritual entity embodied in an objects made of clay, wood, bronze and gold. Every January 10, Benin celebrate the Voodoo festival.

== Modern worship ==
In modern society and sociology, some writers have commented on the ways that people no longer simply worship recognised deities, but also (or instead) worship consumer brands, sports teams, and other people (celebrities). Sociology therefore extends this argument to suggest outside of a religion worship is a process whereby society worships itself, as a form of self-valorization and self-preservation.

== See also ==
- Idol worship
- Intercession
- Major world religions
- Sacrifice - an offering of propitiation or of worship
