= Bukhara (disambiguation) =

Bukhara is a city in Uzbekistan.

Bukhara or Bokhara may also refer to:

== Places ==
=== In India ===
- Bukhara, Uttar Pradesh, a village in Uttar Pradesh

=== In Russia ===
- Bukhara, Bashkortostan, a village in Bashkortostan
- Bukhara, Vologda Oblast, a village in Vologda Oblast

=== In Uzbekistan ===
- Bukhara International Airport, an airport serving the city of Bukhara
- Bukhara Region, also known as 'Buxoro Region' or 'Buxoro Viloyati'
- FC Bukhara, a football club based in the city of Bukhara
- Kogon, formerly named New Bukhara until 1935

== Other uses ==
- Bukhara, a former country in Central Asia centered on the city of Bukhara. Known at various times as:
  - The Khanate of Bukhara (16th–18th centuries)
  - The Emirate of Bukhara (1785–1920)
  - The Bukharan People's Soviet Republic (1920–1924)
- Bukhara magazine, an Iranian Persian-language magazine
- The Bukhara meteorite of 2001, which fell in Bukhara, Uzbekistan (see Meteorite fall)
- Bukhara Caravanserai, a caravanserai in Baku, Azerbaijan
- Bukhara (restaurant) A restaurant in New Delhi, India
- Bukhara rug, an erroneous but (in the West) common term for Turkmen rugs
- Bukharan Jews, a population of Jews from Central Asia
- Bokhara River, a river in Australia
- Bakhra, aka Bukhara, Muzaffarpur district
- Buhara, a character from Hunter × Hunter
- Buxar, aka Bukhara, Bihar in India

== See also ==
- Bukhari (disambiguation)
