= Niaz Ali Khan =

Pakistan engineer, agriculturalist and philanthropist (1880–1976)

Chaudhry Niaz Ali Khan چودہری نیاز علی خان 1880–1976
- Born: 28 June 1880; Mahilpur, Punjab, British Indian Empire
- Died: 24 February 1976 (aged 95); Jauharabad, Khushab District, Pakistan
- Citizenship: Pakistani (post-1947); British Indian (pre-1947)
- Occupations: civil engineer, civil servant, landowner, agriculturalist and philanthropist
- Known for: Founding the Dar ul Islam Movement & Trust and support of Pakistan Movement
- Children: Muhammad Aslam Khan (son); Khan Muhammad Azam (son); Jamila (daughter); Salima (daughter); Saadat (daughter)

Chaudhry Niaz Ali Khan (Urdu: چودہری نیاز علی خان June 28, 1880 – February 24, 1976) was a civil engineer, agriculturalist, and philanthropist who founded "Dar ul Islam Movement" and "Dar ul Islam Trust" in South Asia and "Dar ul Islam Trust" Institutes in Pathankot and Jauharabad. Besides a philanthropist, Niaz was also a civil servant, and a landowner. He was the member of All-India Muslim League and a participant of the Pakistan Movement with the ultimate aim of creating the Muslim-majority areas of British India.

"Dar ul Islam Trust" Institutes established by Niaz Ali Khan are examples of Muslim institutional efforts in India and Pakistan in the mid-20th century to re-establish a culture of learning and scholarship in the Islamic world leading to intellectual enlightenment and social reform.

As a civil engineer, he designed the original tunnel layout inside the Khewra Salt Mines in Pakistan, the world's second largest salt mines.

== Early life ==
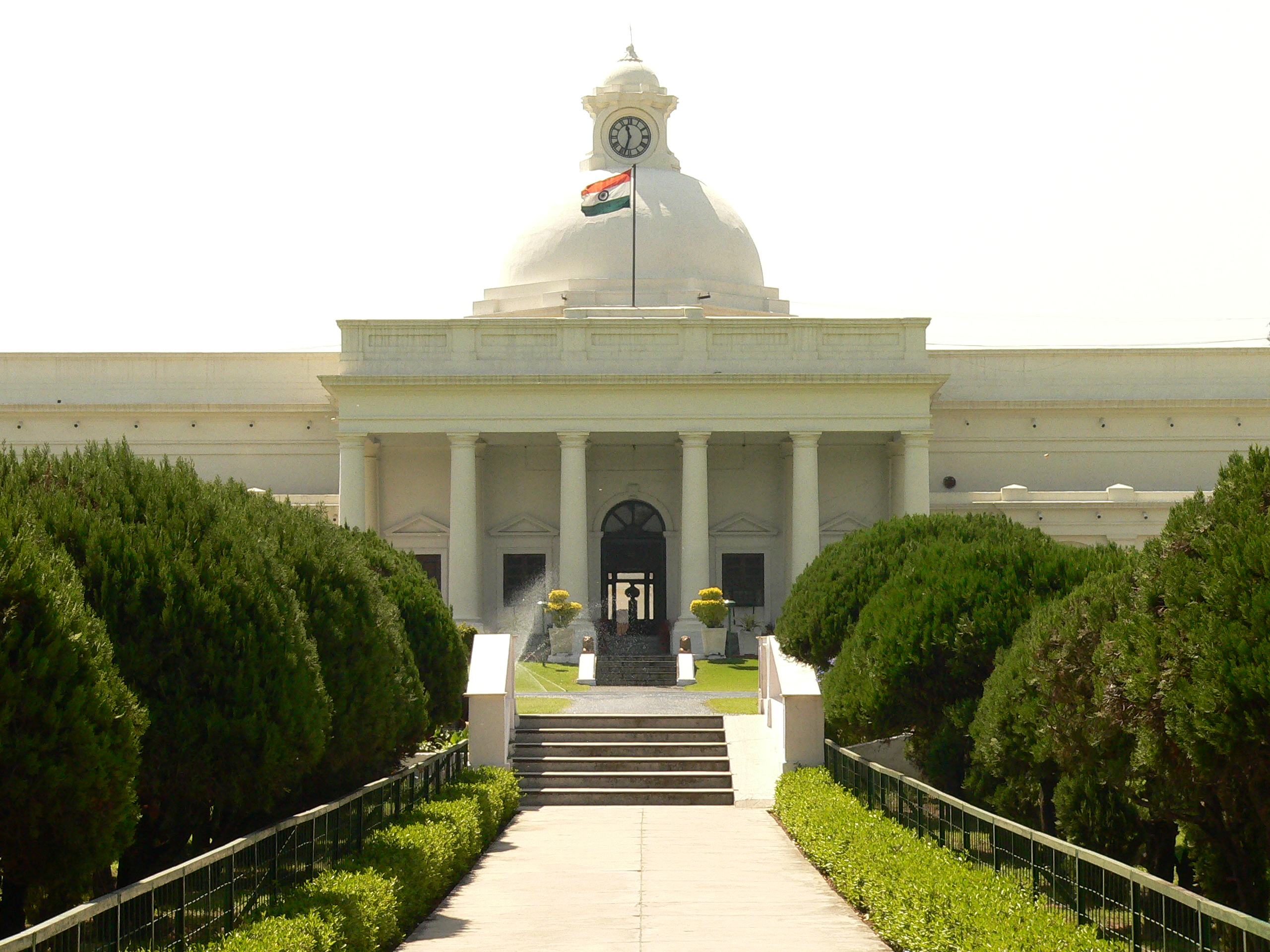
The Thomason College of Civil Engineering, Roorkee (now Indian Institute of Technology Roorkee) from where Chaudhry Niaz Ali Khan graduated with a degree in civil engineering in 1900.

Chaudhry Niaz Ali Khan was born in Mahilpur, Hoshiarpur District, Punjab in the British Indian Empire on 28 June 1880. He was the eldest of four brothers. He had a strict upbringing and that he grew up to become an educated professional.

Between 1896 and 1900, Khan studied at The Thomason College of Civil Engineering in Roorkee and was awarded a degree in civil engineering.

Chaudhry Niaz Ali Khan was an expert equestrian and used to ride regularly, on occasions up to 40–50 kilometres a day. He was also a photography enthusiast and had accumulated a vast collection of cameras and used to develop his own photographs.

== Career ==
After graduating in 1900, Khan joined the British Indian Government and served in the Public Works Department, the Mines Department and the Irrigation Department as Sub-Divisional Officer (SDO). He was able to save much of his salary, which he invested in agricultural landholdings in Jamalpur.

While serving in the Public Works Department in 1901, Chaudhry Niaz Ali Khan oversaw the designing and construction of the 80 km long Pathankot-Dalhousie Road.

While serving in the Mines Department, Chaudhry Niaz Ali Khan designed the tunnel layout inside the Khewra Salt Mines, the world's second largest salt mines.

While serving in the Irrigation Department, Chaudhry Niaz Ali Khan worked on the 3-Canal Anhar-Salasa Irrigation project near Dipalpur in the Punjab. Earlier, while posted near the tribal areas in the North-West Frontier Province, a dam breached and Chaudhry Niaz Ali Khan, being the Sub-Divisional Officer, was tasked with overseeing the repair of the breach. While the repair work was being carried out, a band of tribals started firing on the engineers and labourers working on the repair of the dam from the hills surrounding the dam. Chaudhry Niaz Ali Khan, picked up his rifle, and, along with a couple of labourers, went up to the tribals and asked them to stop the firing and explained to them that the dam project was providing employment to local tribals and would help store water and irrigate barren fields. The tribals, who, perhaps, were more appreciative of his sheer tenacity than the logic of his argument, agreed to immediately halt the attacks. In recognition of his act of courage, the British Indian Government awarded Chaudhry Niaz Ali Khan the Tamgha-e-Shujaat (Medal of Bravery), a military medal seldom awarded to civilians. Chaudhry Niaz Ali Khan explained to the government that he did not deserve the medal since his bravery and success was aided by the fact that some of the labourers working on the project also belonged to the same tribe as those who were attacking them and they played a part in convincing their fellow tribals to halt the attacks. This honest explanation notwithstanding, the medal was awarded.

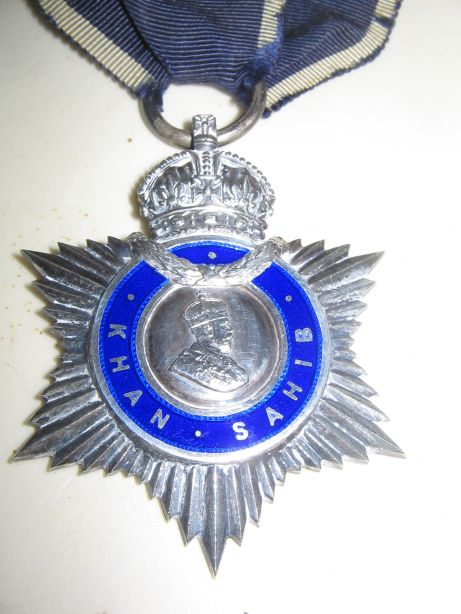
The Khan Sahib medal that accompanies the Khan Sahib title, which was conferred upon Chaudhry Niaz Ali Khan by the British Indian Government in 1931.

In 1931, in recognition of his exemplary public service spanning 30 years, the 32nd Viceroy and Governor-General of India, Freeman Freeman-Thomas, 1st Marquess of Willingdon, on behalf of the British Indian Government, conferred upon Chaudhry Niaz Ali Khan the title of Khan Sahib.

In 1935, Chaudhry Niaz Ali Khan retired from government service and his career in civil engineering and returned to his vast estate in Jamalpur to manage his agricultural lands, which spanned 1,000 acres (4.0 km^{2}). He built his residential complex known as "Qila Jamalpur" (Jamalpur Fort) at a cost of Rs. 100,000, a significant amount at the time. This structure stands to this day and Jamalpur today is also, alternatively, called "Qila Jamalpur".

Chaudhry Niaz Ali Khan was a philanthropist by heart and generously spread charity around him and donated money to various social causes and endowed various charitable and educational institutions with a share of his wealth, especially in the form of land. While spreading charity, he did not discriminate between Muslims and non-Muslims, however, he was particularly concerned about the plight of Muslims in India and, therefore, focused on them. He soon acquired a reputation in northern India as a notable philanthropist.

== Dar ul Islam Movement and Trust ==
Logo of the Dar ul Islam Movement founded by Chaudhry Niaz Ali Khan. The logo consists of the crescent and star representing Islam with a depiction of a book in the middle and the words "Parho aur Parhao" in Urdu meaning "Study and Teach". Inside the crescent are the words "Tehreek-e-Dar ul Islam" in Urdu meaning "Dar ul Islam Movement", circa 1940

Chaudhry Niaz Ali Khan's reputation as a Muslim philanthropist soon caught the attention of South Asia's premier Muslim poet, philosopher and thinker, Allama Muhammad Iqbal who advised Chaudhry Niaz Ali Khan to set up a research institute for Islamic learning that would lead to the education, enlightenment and empowerment of the Muslims of India who, since the fall of the Mughal Empire and the advent of the British Raj, had increasingly regressed economically, socially and politically and were trailing Hindus in education. Iqbal, who was promoting the idea of a separate state for Muslims in India, also felt that such educational establishments were necessary to educate a new crop of Muslim leaders once a separate Muslim state is established and who would play a leadership role in the new Muslim state.

Chaudhry Niaz Ali Khan was greatly inspired by Allama Muhammad Iqbal and his vision for Muslims. In 1936, on the advice of Allama Muhammad Iqbal, Chaudhry Niaz Ali Khan founded and established the Dar ul Islam Trust, which was registered under the Societies Registration Act, 1860, and donated 66 acres (27 ha) of land from his vast 1,000-acre (4.0 km^{2}) estate known as the "Jamalpur Fruit Farms" in Jamalpur (5 km west of Pathankot) in Gurdaspur District, Punjab State, India for the established of the first Dar ul Islam Trust Institute.

The Dar ul Islam Trust's objectives included, inter alia, undertaking "...through all lawful means research on Islamic theology, culture and history and to publish and print works..."

Among the scholars and thinkers participating in the Dar ul Islam project were: Maulana Amin Ahsan Islahi and Maulana Sadruddin Islahi, both notable Qur'anic scholars and writers of the era; Muhammad Asad (formerly Leopold Weiss), a German Jewish convert to Islam, an Islamic scholar and journalist from Lahore; Mian Nizamuddin from Lahore; Shaikh Muhammad Yusuf, Barrister-at-Law from Gurdaspur; Chaudhry Rehmat Ali, Deputy Collector (Retd.) from Anhar; and Maulvi Fatah-ud-Deen, Deputy Director, Department of Agriculture, Punjab.

== Monthly Dar ul Islam journal ==
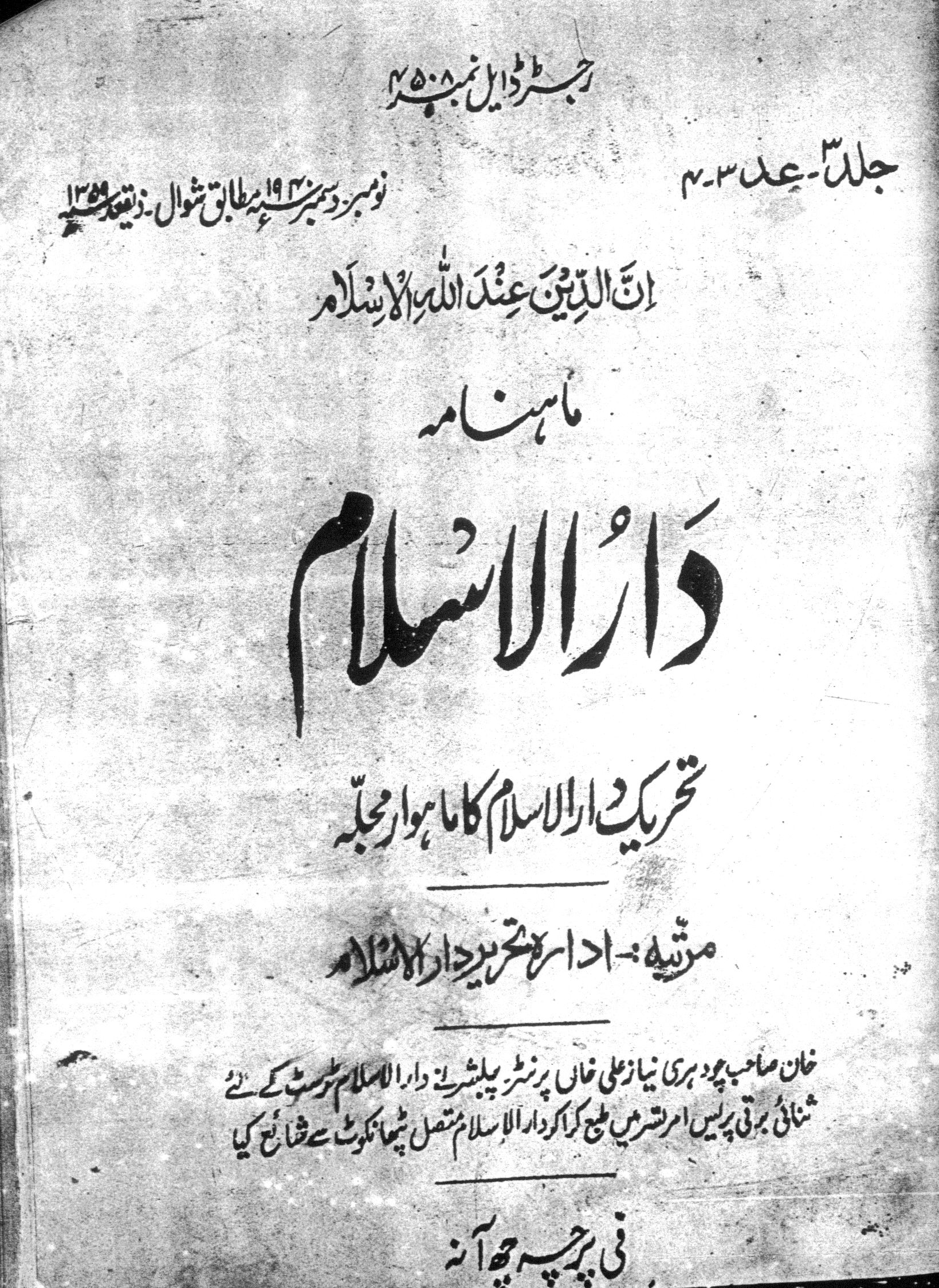
Cover of the Monthly Dar ul Islam Journal of the Dar ul Islam Movement, depicting "Khan Sahib Chaudhry Niaz Ali Khan" as its publisher and printer, circa 1940

In 1940, the Dar ul Islam Movement began publishing an Urdu-language monthly journal called Monthly Dar ul Islam, from Pathankot, whose publisher and printer was Chaudhry Niaz Ali Khan. The Dar ul Islam was a scholarly and literary journal whose purpose was to create enlightenment and awareness amongst the Muslims of British India and also to present the case for an independent state for Muslims in South Asia.

== Maulana Maududi ==
Chaudhry Niaz Ali Khan requested Allama Muhammad Iqbal to nominate an Islamic scholar with good management skills who could manage the day-to-day affairs of the Dar ul Islam Trust. Allama Muhammad Iqbal nominated Ghulam Ahmed Pervez, an eminent civil servant and Islamic scholar. At the time, Ghulam Ahmed Pervez had been tasked by Muhammad Ali Jinnah, then leader of the All India Muslim League, to publish a monthly journal titled Tolu-e-Islam the primary objective of which was to build the case for a separate Muslim state in India and to educate Muslim public opinion in India that according to the Qur'an, ideology and not geographical or ethnic divisions, was the basis for the formation of nation, and that a politically independent Islamic state was a pre-requisite for Muslims to live in accordance with the injunctions of Islam.

When Ghulam Ahmed Pervez told Muhammad Ali Jinnah that he had been asked by Allama Muhammad Iqbal to join the Dar ul Islam Trust at Pathankot and sought his permission, Muhammad Ali Jinnah told Ghulam Ahmed Pervez to nominate someone else for the purpose as he wanted Ghulam Ahmed Pervez to focus entirely on the Tolu-e-Islam project. Ghulam Ahmed Pervez, therefore, recommended the name of Maulana Maududi to Chaudhry Niaz Ali Khan. Ghulam Ahmed Pervez knew Maududi as a young, energetic and intelligent journalist working in Hyderabad Deccan who had considerable knowledge of Islam and felt that Maududi was the right person for the job. It was, therefore, at the recommendation of Ghulam Ahmed Pervez that Chaudhry Niaz Ali Khan wrote to Maududi and invited him to join the Dar ul Islam Trust in Pathankot. The prospect of heading a well-endowed Islamic research institute with a custom-built campus near the picturesque foothills of the Himalayas was an attractive one for Maududi and he agreed.

At the time, it was unknown to both Ghulam Ahmed Pervez and Chaudhry Niaz Ali Khan that Maulana Maududi was against the two nation theory in the form it was being popularized and the methodology adopted by the Muslim League, which would eventually lead to Chaudhry Niaz Ali Khan parting ways with Maududi.

Chaudhry Niaz Ali Khan, however, wanted Allama Iqbal to personally approve the appointment of Maududi at Dar ul Islam. Therefore, when Maududi first visited the Dar ul Islam Trust, Pathankot, in 1937, Chaudhry Niaz Ali Khan took Maududi to meet Allama Muhammad Iqbal at Lahore. Allama Muhammad Iqbal sanctioned Maududi's appointment at the Dar ul Islam Trust, Pathankot. Chaudhry Niaz Ali Khan remained the vital link between Iqbal and Maududi.

In 1938, Maulana Maududi, then aged 35, arrived at Dar-ul-Islam in Pathankot and remained there for some time under the patronage of Chaudhry Niaz Ali Khan before founding the religious political party Jamaat-e-Islami in Lahore in 1941. It was at Chaudhry Niaz Ali Khan's estate at Jamalpur where Maulana Maududi established his publishing house, the Maktabah Jama'at-i-Islami, which published Maulana Maududi's Musalman Aur Maujoodah Siyasi Kashmakash ("Muslims and the Current Political Dilemma"). In 1945, an all-India level conference of the Jamaat-e-Islami was held at the Dar ul Islam Institute, Pathankot. Among the attendees were Maulana Maududi, Maulana Said-ud-din, Maulana Saif-ud-din Qari and Maulana Ghulam Ahmad Ahrar. After the independence of Pakistan on 14 August 1947, the Jamaat-e-Islami was bifurcated into two separate political parties, namely the Jamaat-e-Islami Hind in India and the Jamaat-e-Islami Pakistan.

Chaudhry Niaz Ali Khan, in his later years, with some of his grandchildren and Muhammad Asad (formerly Leopold Weiss) (seated right) and Asad's wife, Pola Hamida Asad (seated left), at Chaudhry Niaz Ali Khan's house in Jauharabad, Pakistan, circa 1957

In his article, "Lessons from History", the noted Islamic scholar, Dr. Israr Ahmad, who himself was influenced by Chaudhry Niaz Ali Khan, writes about Maulana Maududi:

Like the second runner in a relay race, another unconventional and courageous young man appeared on the scene with the firm resolve to continue the mission that was forsaken by Maulana Abul Kalam. He worked alone for nearly seven years as a journalist, presenting a methodology for the establishment of “God’s Kingdom”...and the revival of Islam as a complete way of life. He then worked for sometime at Darul Islam an Islamic research academy established by Chaudhry Niaz Ali Khan, a devotee of Allama Iqbal. He finally laid the foundation of his own party in 1941, called Jama’at-e-Islami, and started an organised movement. This young man was, of course, none other than Maulana Sayyid Abul A’la Maududi (1903 – 1979).

Although the genesis of the Jamaat-e-Islami can be traced to the Dar ul Islam Institute established by Chaudhry Niaz Ali Khan in Pathankot, Chaudhry Niaz Ali Khan himself, being a committed "Muslim Leaguer", never joined the Jamaat-e-Islami nor had anything to do with its founding. This was due to Chaudhry Niaz Ali Khan's disagreement with Maulana Maududi's and the Jamaat-Islami's ideology and approach on a number of issues, particularly on his opposition to the Muslim League's methodology.

== Pakistan ==
Chaudhry Niaz Ali Khan was a member of the All-India Muslim League, the political party led by Muhammad Ali Jinnah that was fighting for a separate homeland for Muslims in India. Chaudhry Niaz Ali Khan's belief in Iqbal's dream for a separate homeland for Muslims in India and his support for the idea of Pakistan led to increased distance between him and Maulana Maududi.

Chaudhry Niaz Ali Khan's support for the creation of Pakistan became evident immediately after Pakistan's independence on 14 August 1947 when Chaudhry Niaz Ali Khan, leaving his home and vast Jamalpur estate behind in the divided Independent India, migrated with his family to the newly established Muslim state of Pakistan and established there the second Dar-ul-Islam Trust Institute in Jauharabad in Khushab District in central Punjab.

== Agriculture ==
Other than his contributions to civil engineering, philanthropy, religious scholarship and education, Chaudhry Niaz Ali Khan, being a premier fruit-grower and agriculturalist, is credited with having introduced to South Asia a variety of fruits and agricultural technologies from around the world, including being the one to introduce into India the exotic Persimmon, Lychee and Sapodilla (Chikoo) fruits from China and Japan, which, for the first time in India, were successfully planted and grown at his 1,000-acre (4.0 km^{2}) agricultural estate known as "Jamalpur Fruit Farms". All three of these fruits spread to other parts of India from the Jamalpur Fruit Farms. The famous lychee farms on the west bank of the River Ravi, west of Lahore, were planted by Chaudhry Niaz Ali Khan's close friend, Mian Amiruddin (later Mayor of Lahore), from lychee tree saplings imported from the Jamalpur Fruit Farms.

The notable agriculturist, Malik Khuda Bakhsh Bucha, who later became agriculture minister in President Ayub Khan's cabinet and known as the "Father of Agriculture" in Pakistan, also consulted Chaudhry Niaz Ali Khan on mango farming techniques and technologies. Seeds of a variety of mango trees from the Jamalpur Fruit Farms were also shipped to South Africa, where they were successfully planted and grown and continue to be grown to this day.

The vast Jamalpur Fruit Farms enabled Chaudhry Niaz Ali Khan to experiment with innovative agricultural techniques and technologies, which were widely adopted in the agriculture of Punjab, particularly in the field of fruit agriculture.

The Jamalpur Fruit Farms acquired a reputation of being one of the technologically advanced fruit farms in India. Students from India's then premier agriculture education establishment, the Punjab Agricultural College and Research Institute, Lyallpur (now University of Agriculture, Faisalabad), used to make annual study trips to the Jamalpur Fruit Farms to study the advanced agricultural techniques and technologies being applied there.

== Family ==
Chaudhry Niaz Ali Khan with his youngest son, Khan Muhammad Azam, at the Tomb of Muhammad Iqbal (on whose advice he established the Dar ul Islam Trust) in Hazuri Bagh, Lahore, Pakistan, circa 1952

Chaudhry Niaz Ali Khan had two sons, Chaudhry Muhammad Aslam Khan and Khan Muhammad Azam, and three daughters, Jamila, Saadat and Salima. Chaudhry Niaz Ali Khan was a strong believer in quality education and this manifested in him providing his children with the best possible education. All three daughters completed their schooling. His eldest son, Muhammad Aslam Khan, was educated at one of India's most famous boys boarding schools, Colonel Brown Cambridge School, Dehradun, and his younger son, Khan Muhammad Azam, at Government College, Lahore and Trinity College, Oxford.

Chaudhry Niaz Ali Khan's son, Khan Muhammad Azam, is married to the eldest daughter of Amir Habibullah Khan Saadi, the pre-1947 Indian freedom fighter and post-1947 Pakistani political leader, and granddaughter of Khan Bahudur Rana Talia Muhammad Khan, the first Muslim Inspector-General of Police in British India. His grandson, K.D. Rana, was married to the daughter of Lieutenant General Bakhtiar Rana, Chief Martial Law Administrator (West Pakistan) and Commander, I Corps, Pakistan Army (1958–1966) and son of Rana Talia Muhammad Khan.

== Later years ==
Chaudhry Niaz Ali Khan died in Jauharabad, Khushab District, Pakistan on 24 February 1976 and is buried in the front courtyard of the Dar ul Islam Trust Institute, Jauharabad, which he founded and which still continues to disseminate religious education to this day.

== Recognition ==
Chaudhry Niaz Ali Khan was recognised with the following awards:

- Tamgha-e-Shujaat (Medal of Bravery) in 1931 – by the British Indian Government – for bravery in protecting an under-repair dam from an attacking tribal militia in the then North-West Frontier Province (now Khyber-Pakhtunkhwa Province) (one of the few civilian recipients of a military medal)
- Khan Sahib Title & Medal in 1935 – by the British Indian Government – for 30 years of exemplary public service
- Pakistan Movement Gold Medal in 2001 – by the Pakistan Movement Workers Trust, Lahore (established by the Government of the Punjab (Pakistan)) – posthumously awarded in recognition of his contribution to the Pakistan Movement

== Published sources ==
- Azam, K.M., Hayat-e-Sadeed: Bani-e-Dar ul Islam Chaudhry Niaz Ali Khan (A Righteous Life: Founder of Dar ul Islam Chaudhry Niaz Ali Khan), Lahore: Nashriyat, 2010 (583 pp., Urdu) ISBN 978-969-8983-58-1
- Chughtai, Muhammad Ikram, Muhammad Asad: Europe's Gift to Islam, Volume 1, Lahore: The Truth Society, 2006 (1240 pp.)
- Hamid, Muhammad, Iqbal: The Poet Philosopher of Fifteenth Century Hijrah, Lahore: Sang-e-Meel Publications, 1980 (Reprint: 1999)
- Yusuf, M., 'Maudoodi: A Formative Phase', Islamic Order, Volume 1, Issue 3, 1979 (pp. 33–43) (This paper throws light on the relationship of Maududi with Chaudhry Niaz Ali Khan and has been cited in Islamic movements in Egypt, Pakistan, and Iran: an annotated bibliography by Asaf Hussain (London: Mansell Publishing Limited; Bronx, N.Y.: Distributed in the US and Canada by H.W. Wilson Co., 1983 ISBN 0-7201-1648-1)
