= Maryam Jameelah =

American-Pakistani author on Islam (1934–2012)

- Born: Margret Marcus; 23 May 1934; New Rochelle, New York, U.S.
- Died: 31 October 2012 (aged 78); Lahore, Pakistan
- Occupation: Author
- Spouse: Muhammad Yusuf Khan
- Children: 5
- Writing career
- Language: English
- Notable works: Over thirty books on Islamic culture and history

Maryam Jameelah (May 23, 1934 – October 31, 2012) was an American-Pakistani author of over thirty books on Islamic culture and history and a female voice for orthodox Islam, known for her writings about the West. Born Margret Marcus in New York City to a non-observant Jewish family, she explored Judaism and other religions during her teens before converting to Islam in 1961 and emigrating to Pakistan. She was married to and had five children with Muhammad Yusuf Khan, a leader in the Jamaat-e-Islami Pakistan political party, and resided in the city of Lahore.

== Biography ==
Jameelah was born Margret Marcus in New Rochelle, New York, to parents of German Jewish descent, and spent her early years in Westchester. As a child, Marcus was psychologically and socially ill at ease with her surroundings, and her mother described her as bright, exceptionally bright, but also "very nervous, sensitive, high-strung, and demanding". Even while in school she was attracted to Asian and particularly Arab culture and history, and counter to the support for Israel among people around her, she generally sympathised with the plight of Arabs and Palestinians.

She entered the University of Rochester after high-school, but had to withdraw before classes began because of psychiatric problems. In Spring, 1953, she entered New York University. There she explored Reform Judaism, Orthodox Judaism, Ethical Culture and the Baháʼí Faith, but found them unsatisfactory, especially in their support for Zionism. In the summer of 1953, she had another nervous breakdown and fell into despair and exhaustion. It was during this period that she returned to her study of Islam and read the Quran. She was also inspired by Muhammad Asad's The Road to Mecca, which recounted his journey and eventual conversion from Judaism to Islam. At NYU she took a course on Judaism's influence on Islam which was taught by Rabbi and scholar Abraham Katsch, which ironically strengthened her attraction to Islam. However Marcus's health grew worse and she dropped out of the university in 1956 before graduation; from 1957 to 59 she was hospitalized for schizophrenia.

Returning home to White Plains in 1959, Marcus involved herself with various Islamic organizations, and began corresponding with Muslim leaders outside America, particularly Maulana Abul Ala Maududi, a leader of Jamaat-e-Islami (Islamic Society) in Pakistan. Finally, on May 24, 1961, she converted to Islam and adopted the name Maryam Jameelah. After accepting Mawlana Maududi's invitation she emigrated to Pakistan in 1962, where she initially resided with him and his family. In 1963, she married Muhammad Yusuf Khan, a member of Jamaat-e-Islami, becoming his second wife. She had five children: two boys and three girls (the first of whom died in infancy). Jameelah regards these years (1962–64) to be the formative period of her life during which she matured and began her life's work as a Muslim defender of conservative Islam.

== Writings ==
Jameelah started writing her first novel, Ahmad Khalil: The Story of a Palestinian Refugee and His Family at the age of twelve; she illustrated her book with pencil sketches and color drawings. She also studied drawing in Fall 1952 at Art Students League of New York, and exhibited her work at Baháʼí Center's Caravan of East and West art gallery. On her emigration to Pakistan she was told that drawings of animals and humans was un-Islamic by Maududi, and abandoned it in favor of writing. Her writings are supplemented by a number of audio and video tapes.

She was deeply critical of secularism, materialism and modernization, both in Western society, as well as in Islam. She regarded traditions such as veiling, polygamy, and gender segregation (purdah) to be ordained by the Quran and by the words of Muhammad, and considered movements to change these customs to be a betrayal of Islamic teachings. Jameelah's books and articles have been translated into several languages including Urdu, Persian, Turkish, Bengali and Indonesian. Her correspondence, manuscripts, bibliographies, chronologies, speeches, questionnaires, published articles, photographs, videocassettes, and artwork are included in the Humanities and Social Sciences Library collection of the New York Public Library.

== Bibliography ==
Books by Jameelah

- A great Islamic movement in Turkey: Badee-u-Zaman Said Nursi
- A manifesto of the Islamic movement
- A select bibliography of Islamic books in English
- Ahmad Khalil: the biography of a Palestinian Arab refugee
- At home in Pakistan (1962-1989) : the tale of an American expatriate in her adopted country
- Correspondence between Abi-l-A'La Al-Maudoodi and Maryam Jameelah
- Islam and Modernism
- Islam and orientalism
- Islam and the Muslim woman today
- Islam and our social habits : Islamic manners versus Western etiquette
- Islam and modern man : the prospects for an Islamic renaissance, the call of Islam to modern man
- Islam versus Ahl al-Kitab: past and present
- Islam versus the West
- Islamic culture in theory and practice
- Islam face to face with the current crisis
- Is Western civilization universal?
- Memoirs of childhood and youth in America (1945-1962) : the story of one Western convert's quest for truth
- Modern technology and the dehumanization of man
- Shaikh Hassan alBanna & al Ikhwan al-Muslimun
- Shaikh Izz-ud-Din Al-Qassam Shaheed : a great Palestinian mujahid, (1882-1935) : his life and work
- Shehu Uthman dan Fodio, a great mujaddid of West Africa
- The Generation Gap - Its Causes and Consequences
- The Holy Prophet and his impact on my life
- The resurgence of Islam and our liberation from the colonial yoke
- Three Great Islamic Movements in the Arab World of the Recent Past
- Two great Mujahadin of the recent past and their struggle for freedom against foreign rule : Sayyid Ahmad Shahid; Imam Shamil: a great Mujahid of Russia
- Westernization and Human Welfare
- Western civilization condemned by itself; a comprehensive study of moral retrogression and its consequences
- Western imperialism menaces Muslims
- Why I embraced Islam

== Sources ==
- Esposito, John L.; Voll, John Obert (2001). "Maryam Jameelah: Voice of conservative Islam". Makers of contemporary Islam. Oxford: Oxford University Press. pp. 54–67. ISBN 0-19-514127-X.
- "Maryam Jameelah Papers" (PDF). Manuscripts and Archives Division, New York Public Library.
- Rozehnal, Robert (2004). "Debating orthodoxy, contesting tradition: Islam in contemporary South Asia". In R. Michael, Feener (ed.). Islam in World Cultures: Comparative Perspectives. Santa Barbara, Calif: ABC-CLIO. ISBN 1-57607-516-8.
- Haddad, Yvonne Yazbeck; Smith, Jane Bandy; Moore, Kathleen Dean (2006). Muslim women in America: the challenge of Islamic identity today. Oxford: Oxford University Press. ISBN 0-19-517783-5.
