= Arafat (journal) =

- Discipline: Islamic Law
- Language: English
- Edited by: Muhammad Asad

Publication details
- History: 1946-1947
- Publisher: Muhammad Asad (Pakistan)

Standard abbreviations
- ISO 4: Arafat

Indexing
- OCLC no.: 427533470

Arafat: A Monthly Critique of Muslim Thought was a monthly periodical founded by Muhammad Asad in Kashmir in 1946.

== See also ==
- Muhammad Asad Bibliography
- This Law of Ours and Other Essays
- Timeline of Muhammad Asad's life
