= Bakhtiar Rana =

Pakistani general

Bakhtiar Rana HJ SPk HQA MC
- Born: 3 November 1910; Hoshiarpur, Punjab, British India (Present day India)
- Died: 10 February 1998 (aged 87); Lahore, Punjab, Pakistan
- Military career
- Allegiance: British Raj (1931-1947); Pakistan (1947-1966)
- Branch: (British Raj) British Indian Army; Pakistan Army
- Service years: 1931–66
- Rank: Lieutenant General
- Units: 1st Piffers, Frontier Force Regiment
- Commands: I Corps in Mangla; Ins-Gen. Frontier Force Regiment; Ins-Gen. FC KPK
- Conflicts: Waziristan Campaign; Second World War; Mediterranean and Middle East theatre; Indo-Pakistani War of 1965
- Awards: Hilal-e-Jurat; Sitara-e-Pakistan; Sitara-e-Quaid-e-Azam; Military Cross

Bakhtiar Rana HJ SPk HQA MC (Urdu: بختيار رانا ; b. 3 November 1910–10 February 1998) was a senior Pakistani military officer who was notable for commanding the 1st Corps, during the Indo-Pakistani War of 1965.

== Biography ==
Rana was born in Hoshiarpur, Punjab in British India on 3 November 1910 into a Panjabi Muslim Rajput family that belonged to the Naroo clan of the Rajput tribe. His father, Rana Talia, was an officer in the British Indian Army who was later appointed as the first Muslim Inspector-General of the Punjab Police based in Patiala State. Rana Talia was later appointed to the North-West Frontier Province and briefly served in the Frontier Constabulary where he was deployed in Kohat, Hangu, and areas adjacent to Afghanistan.

After his matriculation, Bakhtiar went to attend the famed Aligarh Muslim University (AMU) and later made a transfer to attend the Forman Christian College University in Lahore. In 1931, Bakhtiar left his university studies when he was accepted to join the Indian Military Academy in Dehradun, and passed out from the academy in 1936.

== Military career ==
In 1936, he was commissioned in the 1st Piffers in the Frontier Force Regiment as a 2nd-Lt. In 1939, Lt. Bakhtiar participated in World War II, first serving in India's frontier operations before being dispatched to the Mediterranean and Middle East Front, and later fighting in North Africa and Italy. For the time being, Maj. Bakhtiar served as an acting commanding officer of the 6/13th FF Rifles. His valorous actions earned him the Military Cross from Great Britain in 1945–1946. In August 1947, Maj. Bakhtiar held the command of the 2nd Garhwal Rifles before being posted in western India.

After the partition of India, Lt-Col. Bakhtiar decided to transfer to the Pakistan Army, and his 1st Piffers Btn was known for having more locals than any other regiment in the country at that time. In 1953, Brig. Bakhtiar Rana was appointed to command the Frontier Corps in Khyber-Pakhtunkhwa as its Inspector-General until 1955.

He was Chief Martial Law Administrator (West Pakistan). As a Lieutenant General, he commanded one of Pakistan Army's strike corps, I Corps, as its Corps Commander from 1958 to 1966. As a Brigadier, he commanded the Frontier Corps in Khyber Pakhtunkhwa as its Inspector-General from 1953 to 1955. His younger son, Major-General Ghaziuddin Rana, also went on to command the Frontier Corps from 1988 to 1990. To this day, they are the only father and son duo to have commanded the Frontier Corps during their separate military careers.

As a Lieutenant General, he commanded one of Pakistan Army's strike corps, I Corps, as its Corps Commander from 1958 to 1966. During the Indo-Pakistani War of 1965, Lt. Gen. Bakhtiar Rana was the only lieutenant general commanding a corps, namely 1 Corps, and he was one of only two lieutenant generals in the Pakistan Army during the war, the other being Lt. Gen. Altaf Qadir, who was on deputation to the Central Treaty Organization (CENTO).

== Family ==
Rana had two sons and one daughter. Both his sons, Ghaziuddin Rana and Salahuddin Rana, joined the Pakistan Army and rose to the ranks of Major General and Brigadier respectively. His younger son, Maj. Gen. Ghazi-ud-din Rana, also served as his Aide-de-camp. Lt. Gen. Bakhtiar Rana's sister, Begum Akhtar Sultan, was married to Amir Habibullah Khan Saadi and his daughter, Talat, was married to the grandson of Chaudhry Niaz Ali Khan.

== Death ==
Rana died in Lahore, Pakistan, at 4:30 pm on 10 February 1998.

== Awards and decorations ==
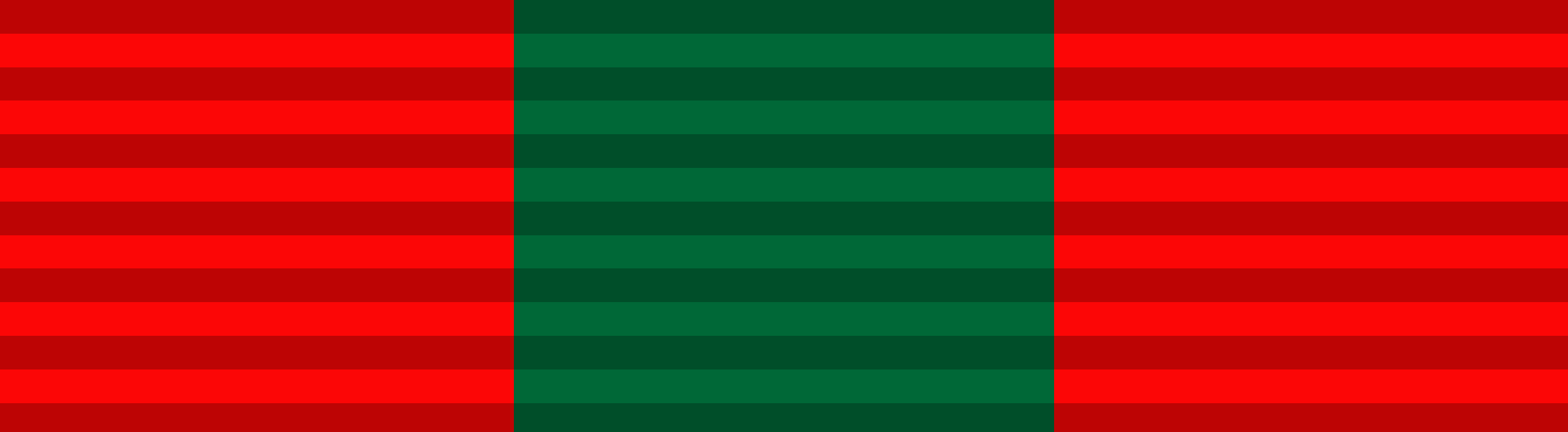

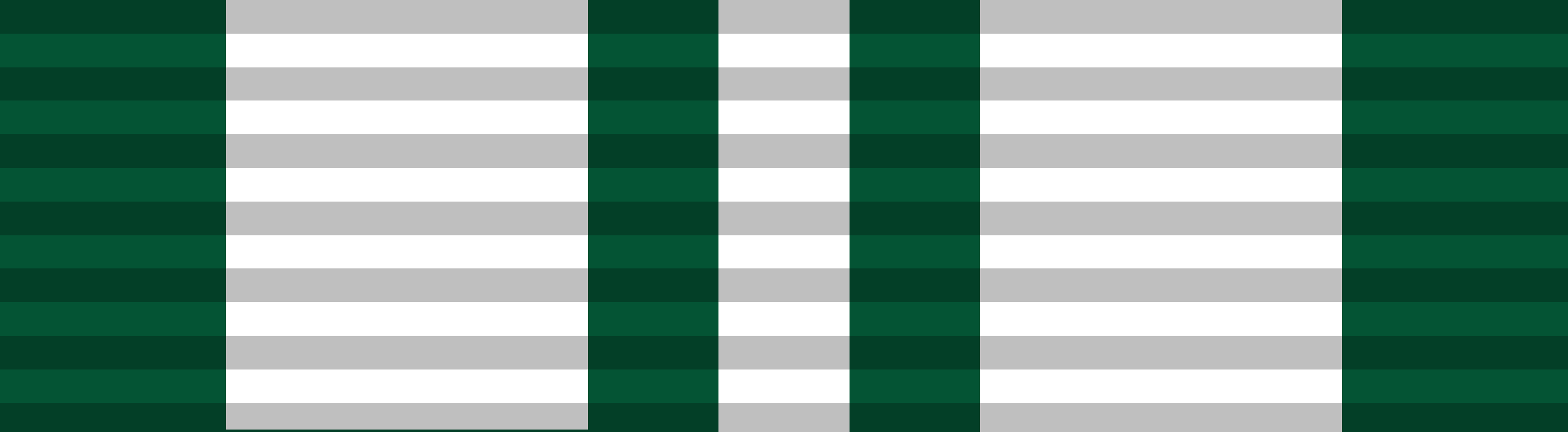

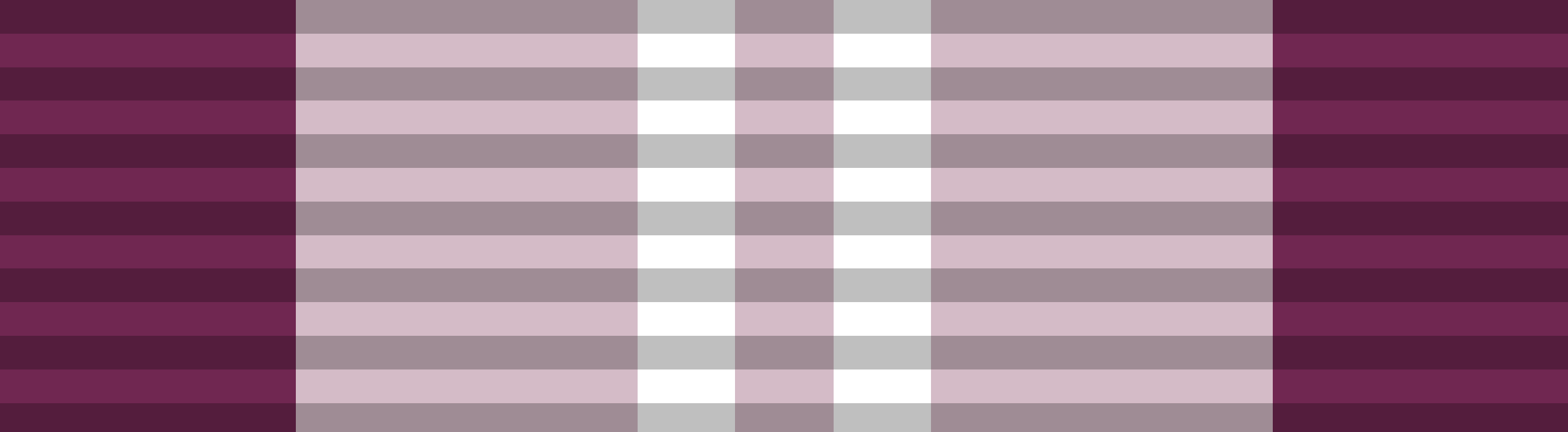

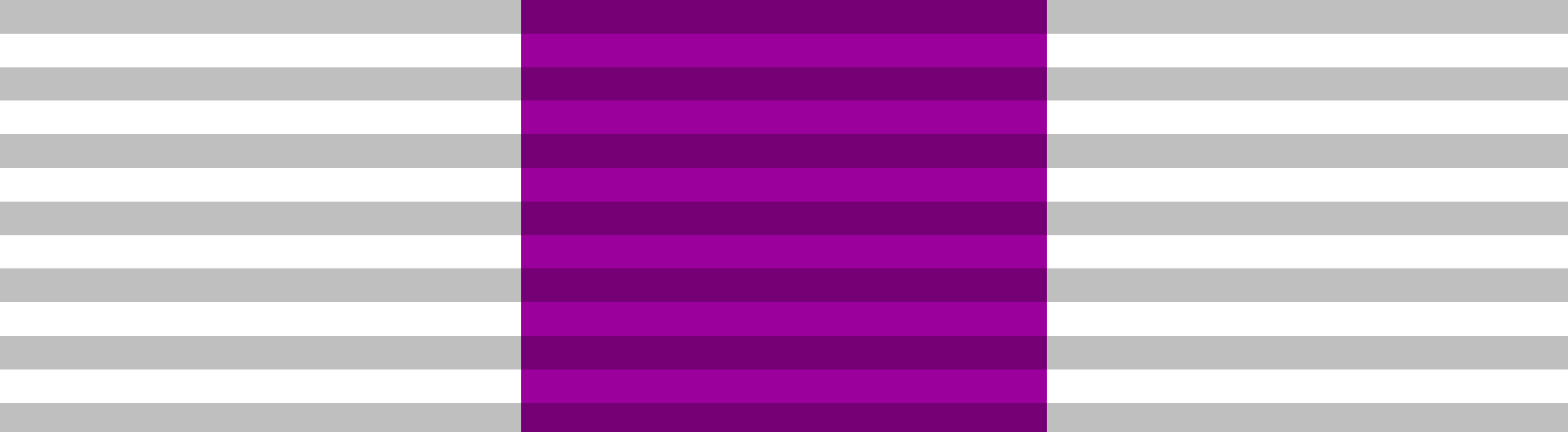

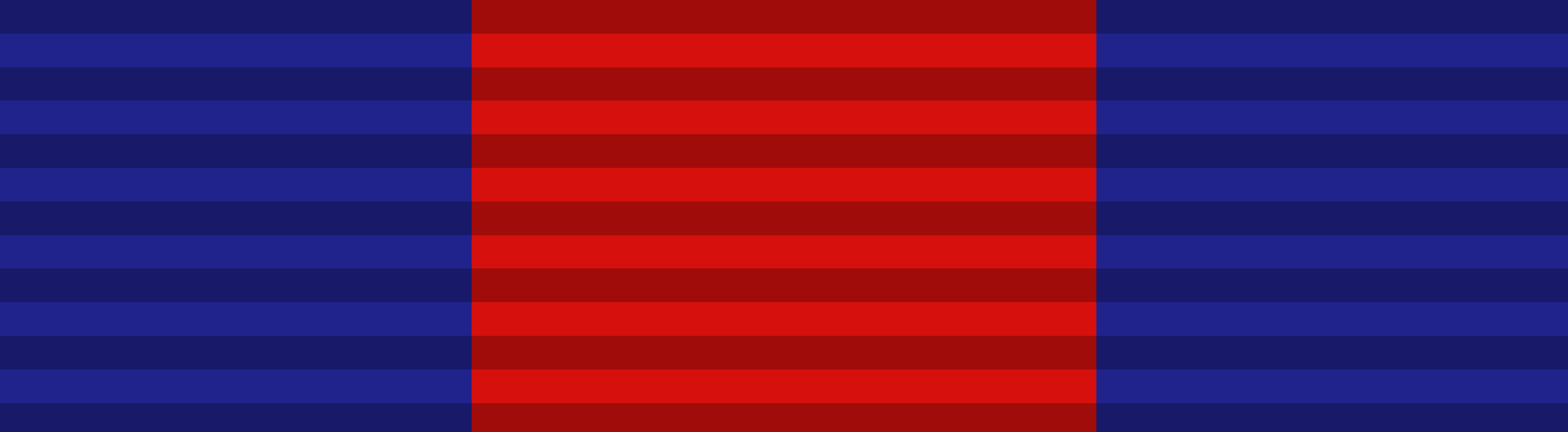

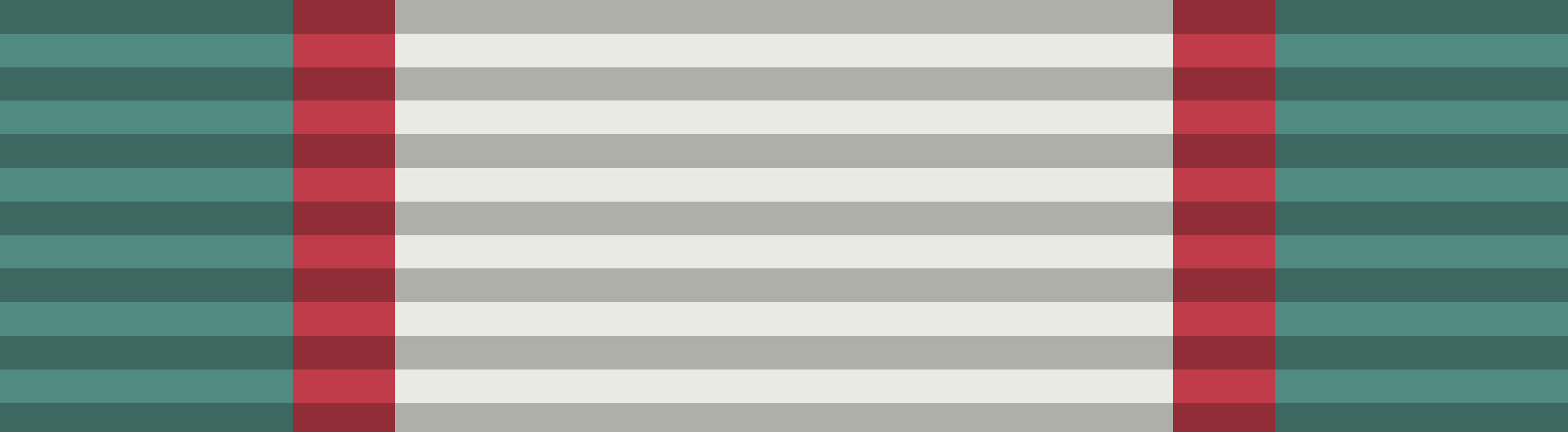

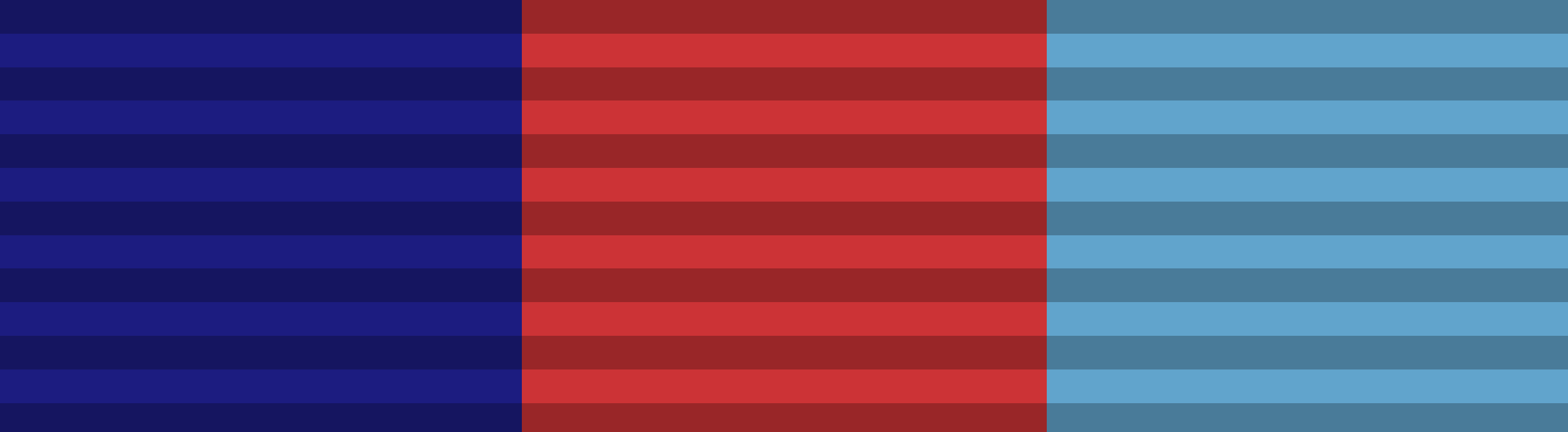

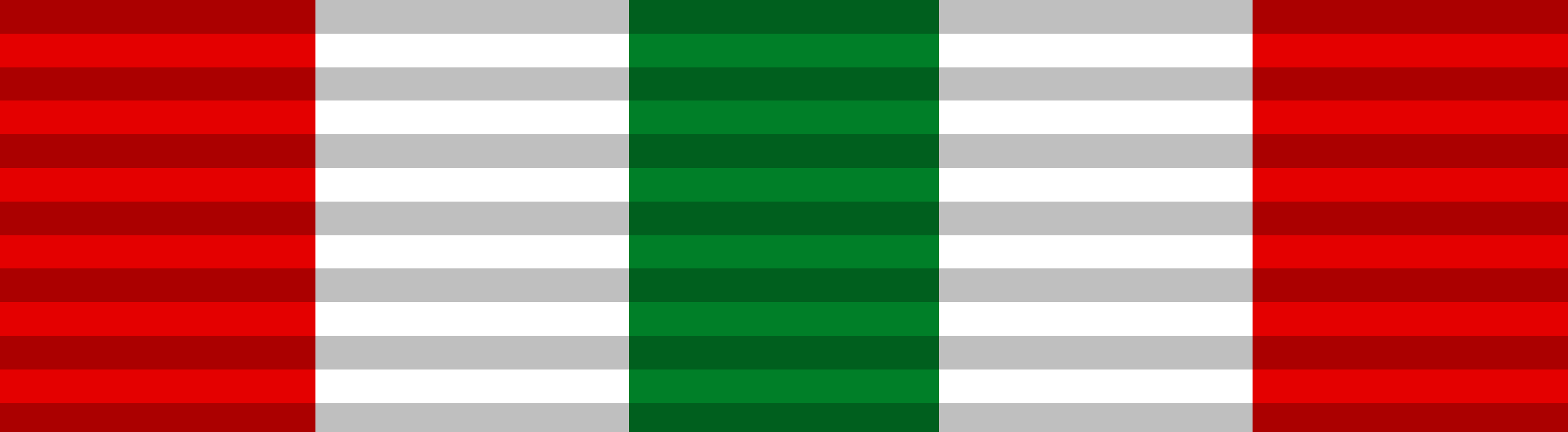

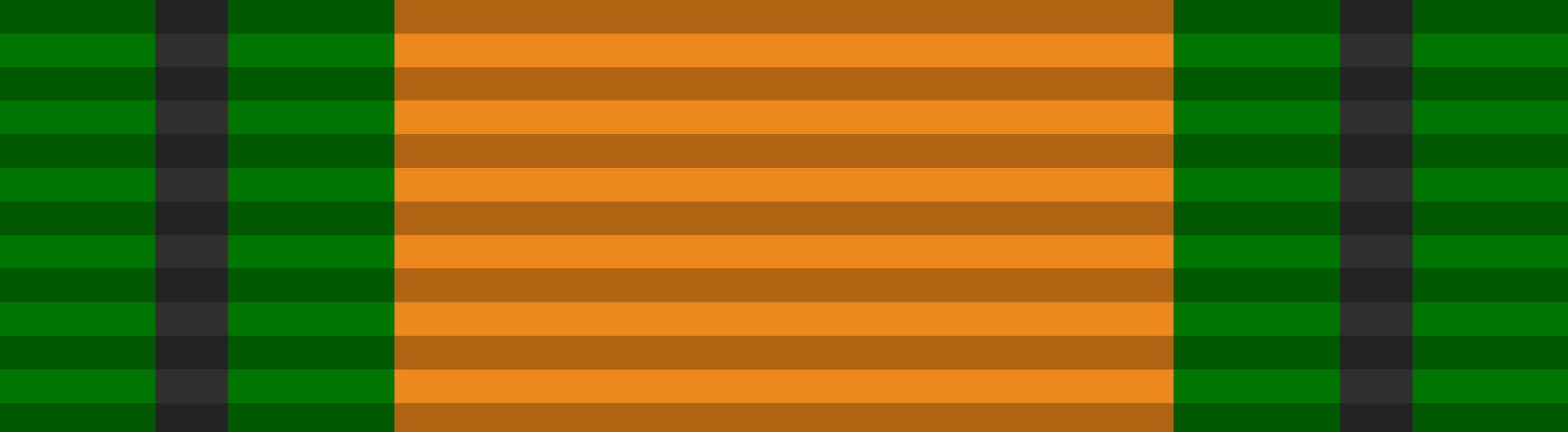

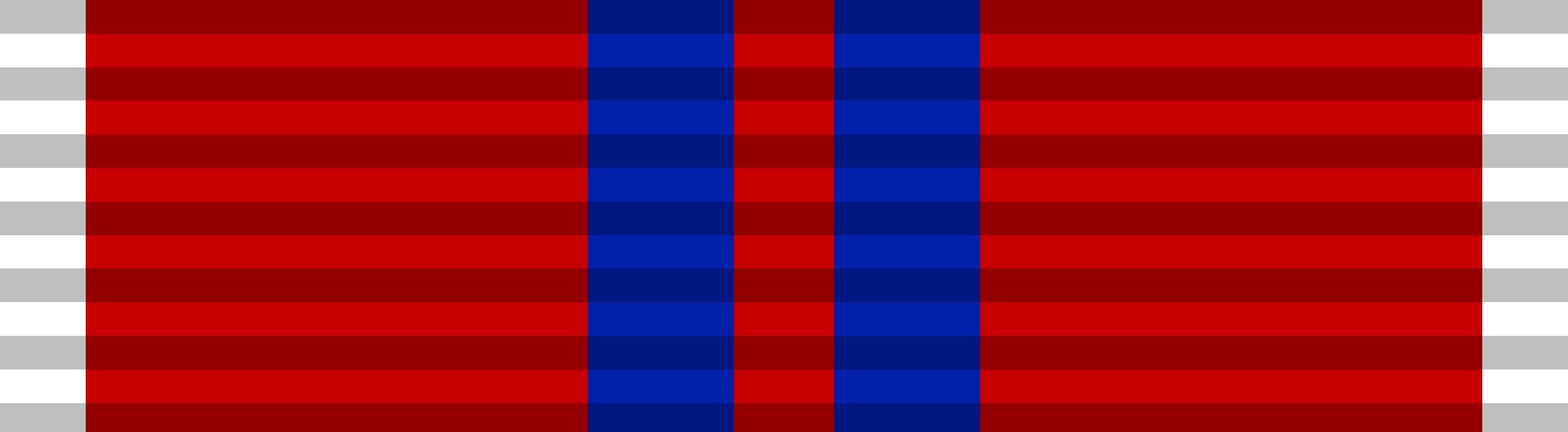

Hilal-e-Jurat (Crescent of Courage) 1965 War	Sitara-e-Pakistan (Star of Pakistan) (SPk)	Sitara-e-Quaid-e-Azam (SQA)	Tamgha-e-Diffa (General Service Medal) 1965 War Clasp
Sitara-e-Harb 1965 War (War Star 1965)	Tamgha-e-Jang 1965 War (War Medal 1965)	Pakistan Tamgha (Pakistan Medal) 1947	Tamgha-e-Jamhuria (Republic Commemoration Medal) 1956
Military Cross (MC) (awarded for GALLANTRY in Italy 1945)	Indian Distinguished Service Medal	India General Service Medal (1936) North West Frontier 1937–39 Clasp	1939-1945 Star
Italy Star	Defence Medal	War Medal 1939-1945	Queen Elizabeth II Coronation Medal (1953)

=== Foreign decorations ===
Foreign Awards
UK	Military Cross (MC)
UK	Indian Distinguished Service Medal
UK	India General Service Medal (1936)
UK	1939-1945 Star
UK	Italy Star
UK	Defence Medal
UK	War Medal 1939-1945
UK	Queen Elizabeth II Coronation Medal
