= Amir Habibullah Khan Saadi =

Parliament member

Rai Amir Habibullah Khan Saadi
- رائے امیر حبیب الله خان سعدی
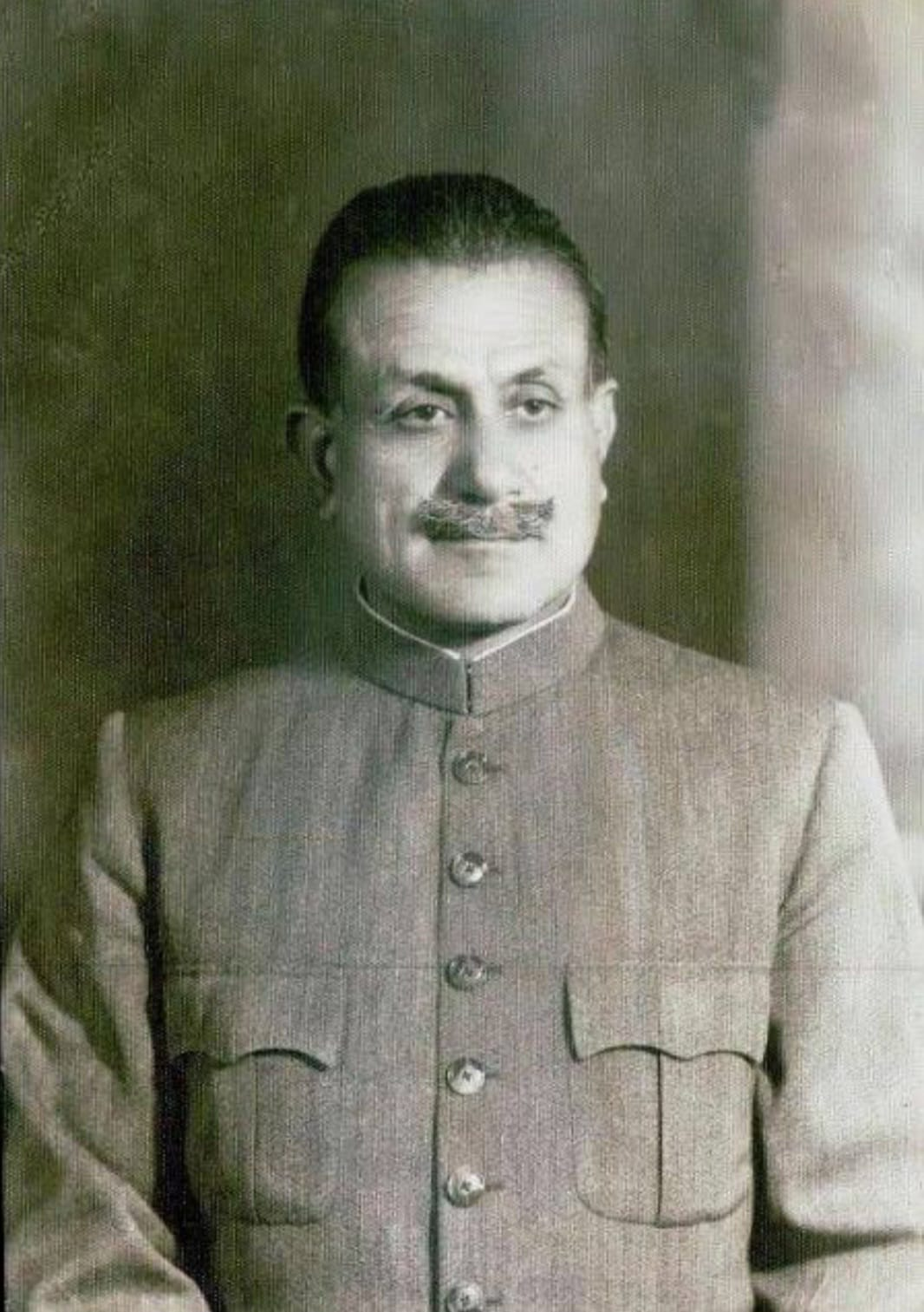
- Khan Saadi in 1962
- Born: Rai Amir Habibullah Khan; 21 December 1909; Jalandhar District, Punjab, British India
- Died: 6 March 1989 (aged 79)
- Citizenship: Pakistani (post-1947); British Indian (pre-1947)
- Occupations: Ruler of Talwan, army officer, 2nd royal horse (lancers), British Indian army, politician and political leader
- Known for: Revolting against the British for maltreatment of Indians in the British Indian Army; Support of Pakistan Movement; Member of the Provincial Assembly of West Pakistan (Fifth Assembly) (9 June 1962 to 8 June 1965); Role in Movement for the Restoration of Democracy (MRD) in Pakistan in the 1970s; Pakistan National Alliance (PNA) candidate for the National Assembly of Pakistan in the 1977 General Elections
- Children: 6

Rai Amir Habibullah Khan Saadi (Urdu: رائے امیر حبیب الله خان سعدی; 1989 – 1909) was a Manj Rajput ruler of Talwan in Jalandhar District, Punjab, British India, and a military officer who became a freedom fighter in British India and a political leader in Pakistan. He is known in the pre-1947 era for struggling against British rule in India and in favour of the Pakistan Movement and, in the post-1947 era for the restoration of democracy in Pakistan under various autocratic rulers.

Amir (pronounced "Ameer") Habibullah Khan Saadi was a Member of the Provincial Assembly of West Pakistan (Fifth Assembly) (9 June 1962 to 8 June 1965). He was one of the prominent leaders of the Movement for the Restoration of Democracy (MRD) in the 1970s against the government of Prime Minister Zulfiqar Ali Bhutto and stood as the candidate of the Pakistan National Alliance (PNA) against Mian Salahuddin of the Pakistan Peoples Party in the 1977 General Elections for a seat in the National Assembly of Pakistan from Lahore but was defeated in what were widely alleged to be rigged elections.

Habibullah Khan Saadi was a member of the Khaksar Tehreek, an anti-colonial social uplift movement, and an associate of its leader, Allama Mashriqi.

== Early life ==
Amir Habibullah Khan Saadi was born "Rai Amir Habibullah Khan" on 21 December 1909 in a Manj Rajput family in Talwan, Jalandhar District, Punjab, British Indian Empire. He was named after Habibullah Khan, the then Amir of Afghanistan. His father, Rai Saadullah Khan, was a wealthy lawyer, landowner, and ruler of Talwan, Jalandhar District, Punjab, where the family had its ancestral fort known as "Qila Talwan" ("Fort Talwan"). Rai Saadullah Khan was also the first Muslim member of Punjab's Legislative Assembly, a feat he had achieved by inflicting an electoral defeat on another Muslim Rajput landlord, Chaudhry Abdul Rehman Khan.

Habibullah Saadi received his early schooling in Jalandhar. He later joined Islamia College, Lahore, contrary to the wishes of his father who wanted him to join his alma mater, Forman Christian College, Lahore. After completing his bachelor's degree, Habibullah Saadi joined India's premier agriculture education establishment, the Punjab Agricultural College and Research Institute, Faisalabad (now University of Agriculture, Faisalabad) from where he was awarded an external degree of Master of Science in agriculture by the University of California, which had an arrangement with the institute.

In his youth, he suffixed the name "Saadi" with his name (derived from his father's name, Saadullah), thus becoming "Amir Habibullah Khan Saadi".

After the dissolution of the Mughal Empire, the Manj Rais of Talwan and Talwandi and Raikot ruled over an extensive territory south of the River Sutlej, till they were dispossessed of it by the Ahluwalia Sikhs and Ranjit Singh.

== Military career ==
As was the case with many scions of landed Rajput families, who considered the military as a noble and honourable calling, Habibullah Khan, opted for a military career.

Habibullah Khan received his military training at The Infantry School, Mhow, the oldest and largest military training centre of the British Indian Army, and was commissioned in 1938 as a Second Lieutenant in the 2nd Royal Horse ("Lancers"), an elite cavalry unit of the British Indian Army. He served in Hyderabad Deccan, Ahmednagar, Ambala, and Rawalpindi.

During the Second World War, he fought with his unit on the Allied side against the Axis powers in Egypt, Cyprus, and Mesopotamia (modern-day Iraq).

At the end of the Second World War, after he returned to Rawalpindi, his critical attitude towards the British was taken notice of and he was asked to resign from the British Indian Army, which he refused to do and asked to be court-martialed if he was guilty of an offence. He was, therefore, court-martialled in 1946 on charges of "seditious behaviour", but not before giving a speech before the Field General Court Martial and telling them "if the Crown cannot respect the soldiers serving under its command, then the days of the British Empire are over."

== Political career ==
Amir Habibullah Khan Saadi was a Member of the Provincial Assembly of West Pakistan (Fifth Assembly) (9 June 1962 to 8 June 1965) elected from a constituency of Faisalabad. He was one of the prominent leaders of the Movement for the Restoration of Democracy (MRD) in the 1970s against the government of Prime Minister Zulfiqar Ali Bhutto and stood as the candidate of the Pakistan National Alliance (PNA) against Mian Salahuddin of the Pakistan Peoples Party in the 1977 General Elections for a seat in the National Assembly of Pakistan from Lahore but was defeated in what was widely alleged to be rigged elections. Habibullah Khan Saadi was a member of the Khaksar Tehreek, a social uplift movement.

Amir Habibullah Khan Saadi was arrested on 5 November 1963 for actively opposing the military government of President Ayub Khan and the excesses of the Governor of West Pakistan, Malik Amir Mohammad Khan, Nawab of Kalabagh. The following is an excerpt from the West Pakistan Assembly Debates regarding the incident:

On 2 December 1963, Mr Iftikhar Ahmad Khan raised a question of privilege arising from the arrest of Amir Habibullah Khan Saadi on 5 November 1963. He contended that the Hon’ble member was arrested as a consequence of the honest and fair discharge of his duties as a member of the House during the last session; and, that the circumstances conclusively revealed that his arrest and the attempt falsely to implicate him was part of the scheme to stop Members of the Opposition from participating in the deliberations of the House. The Minister for Law opposed the motion inter alia arguing that as the matter was sub judice, it could not be discussed in the House; and, as the action had been taken under the law of the land it did not involve any breach of privilege. After hearing the Members and the Law Minister, the Speaker, Ch Muhammad Anwar Bhinder, ruled as under —

“Amir Habibullah Khan Saadi, MPA, was arrested by the Lahore Police on 5 November 1963 on the allegations of committing offences under sections 307, 395, 332, 147, 148, 149, 427, 454, 124-A, and 153-B of Pakistan Penal Code. As I have held previously, a Member of the Provincial Assembly is not immune from arrest or detention if he commits an offence punishable under the law. Amir Habibullah Khan Saadi was arrested in the ordinary administration of law and as such, there is no breach of privilege. This privilege motion is, therefore, ruled out of order.”

Being one of the prominent leaders of the Movement for the Restoration of Democracy (MRD) in the 1970s against the government of Prime Minister Zulfiqar Ali Bhutto, Amir Habibullah Khan Saadi was also arrested and detained by the government of Prime Minister Zulfiqar Ali Bhutto.

== Family ==
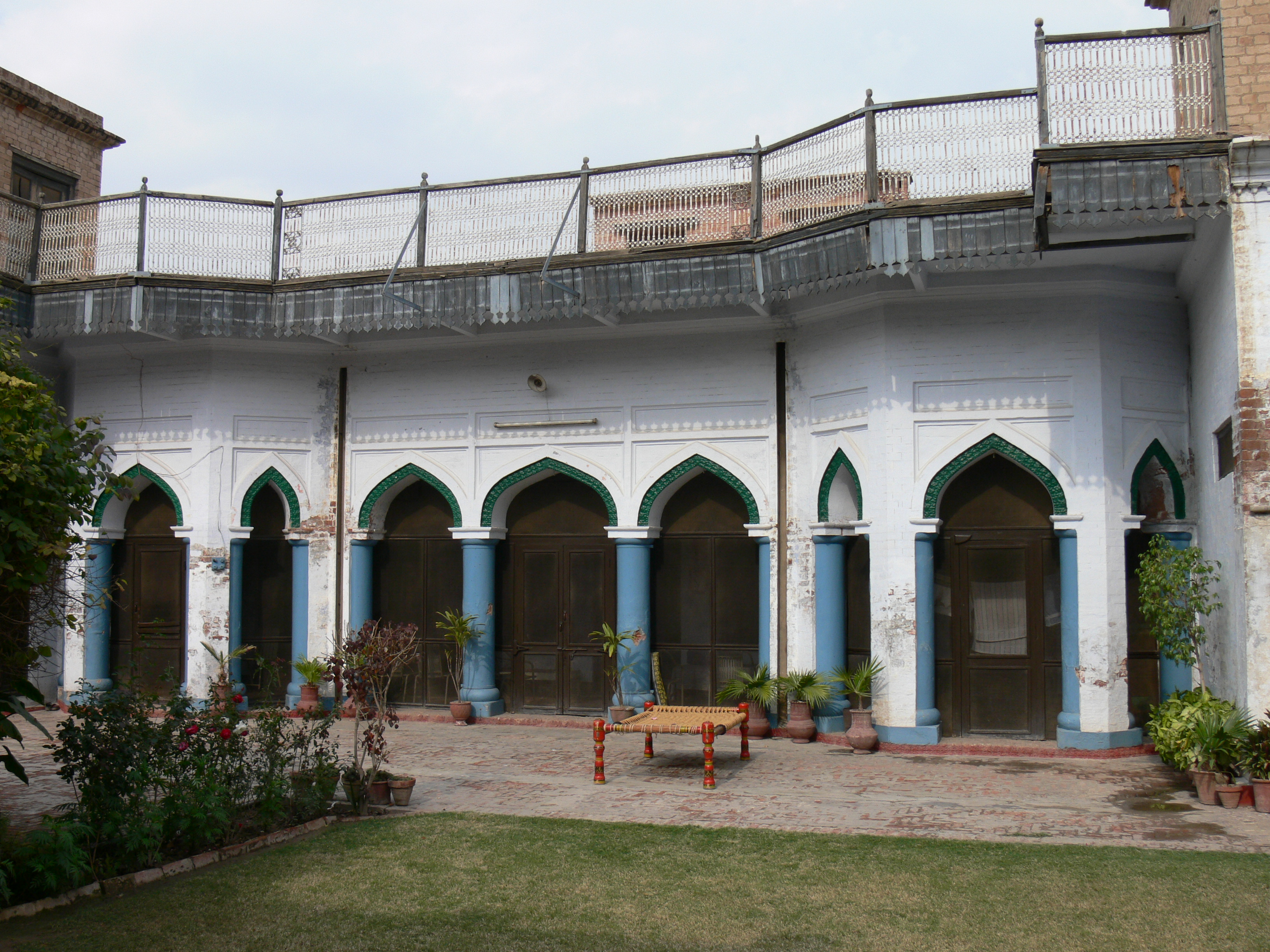
Saad Manzil, the haveli of Amir Habibullah Khan Saadi in Kamalia, Pakistan

Amir Habibullah Khan was married to Begum Akhtar Sultan and had two sons and four daughters. His wife was his cousin and daughter of Khan Bahadur Rana Talia Muhammad Khan, a former British Indian Army officer and the first Muslim Inspector-General of Police in British India, who served as Inspector-General of Patiala State and the Northwest Frontier Province in British India. Her daughter is married to the son of the Rana of Rahon, Chaudhry Abdul Rehman Khan. Her brother, Lieutenant General Bakhtiar Rana, was Chief Martial Law Administrator (West Pakistan) and Commander, I Corps, Pakistan Army (1958–1966). His eldest daughter was married to K. M. Azam, the younger son of Chaudhry Niaz Ali Khan. 'Saad Manzil' Haveli in Kamalia, Punjab is an architecturally and historically significant building.

== Death ==
Amir Habibullah Khan died on 6 March 1989 in Lahore, Pakistan, and is buried in his family's ancestral graveyard in his farm outside Kamalia, Pakistan. Written on his tombstone is the following verse in Urdu:

Iss khaak mai posheeda hai wo Sahib-e-Israr
Gardan na jhuki jis ki Jahangir ke agay

Translation:

In this earth lies buried that Knower of Secrets
Whose neck did not bow before Jahangir
