= Bukhari Daud =

Indonesian academician and ex-regent of Aceh Besar (1959–2021)

Tengku Haji Bukhari Daud
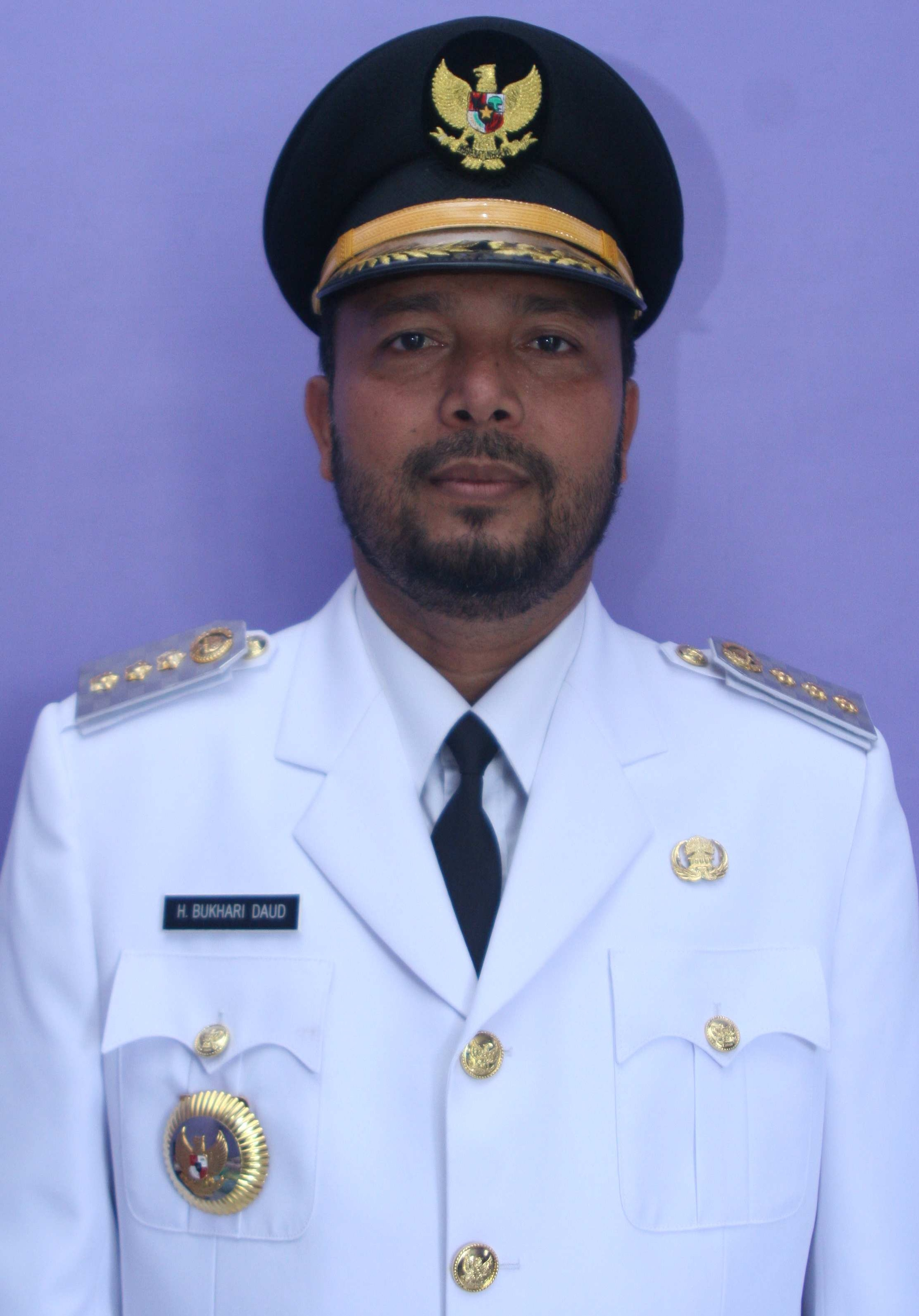

Regent of Aceh Besar
- In office 1 March 2007 – 1 March 2012
- Governor: Irwandi Yusuf; Tarmizi Abdul Karim (acting)
- Preceded by: Sayuthi Ismail Acting: Rusli Muhammad; Zaini Azis; A. Madjid AR
- Succeeded by: Zulkifli Ahmad (acting); Mukhlis Basyah

Personal details
- Born: 25 October 1959 Aceh Besar, Indonesia
- Died: 11 February 2021 (aged 61) Lampeuneurut, Aceh Besar, Aceh, Indonesia
- Spouse: Maslaila
- Children: Nanda Riska, Ade Nanda Al-Fitrah, Putra Elmukram, Syifa Busyra
- Education: Syiah Kuala University (until 1988, S.Pd.); State University of New York (1991–1993, M.Ed.); University of Melbourne (1994–1998, Dr.)

Bukhari Daud (25 October 1959 – 11 February 2021) was an Indonesian English-language teacher and politician who was the Regent of Aceh Besar from 2007 until 2012.

== Early life and education ==
Bukhari Daud was born in Aceh Besar. Following his graduation from madrasah ibtidaiyah (Islamic elementary school), he continued studying at the Montasik Junior High School, a school four kilometres away from his house. Bukhari always traveled on foot to the junior high school. After finishing his education in the junior high school, Bukhari enrolled at a high school. Bukhari attended the English Department in the Syiah Kuala University's Faculty of Teacher Training and graduated in 1988. He became an English language lecturer in the university two years later.

In 1991, Bukhari went to the University at Buffalo to pursue a master's degree in TESOL (Teaching English to Speakers of Other Languages). Bukhari graduated in 1993 and continued his studies at the University of Melbourne a year later. He graduated from the university in 1998 with a doctorate.

== Regent of Aceh Besar ==
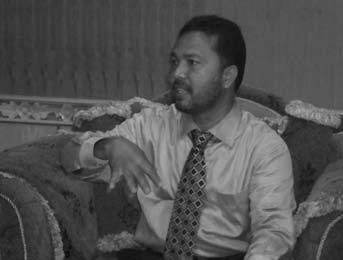
Bukhari Daud in 2010.

=== Election ===
Bukhari ran as a candidate in the 2006 Aceh Besar regent election, choosing Anwar Ahmad as his running mate. Bukhari was supported by the National Mandate Party and the Reform Star Party. He won the elections with 37,810 votes or 25.58% of the total valid votes. Bukhari assumed office in 2007.

=== Attempts to resign ===
A year into his term, on 5 September 2008, Bukhari caused a stir after he announced his resignation from the office following a meeting with bureau heads. Bukhari initially refused to explain his motives. Several reporters who went into his house to ask him about the matter were told to leave by his adjutant and relatives. Antara remarked that Bukhari's resignation was the first of its case in Indonesia.

Several allegations sprang up after his resignation. The media remarked that Bukhari resigned due to the extensive intervention exerted by his "Success Team"—a group of people that supported him during the regency election—in bureaucratic processes and procurements. The media also alleged that Anwar Ahmad—who would succeed Bukhari if he resigned—exerted the same pressure. Another source stated that Bukhari resigned due to heavy restrictions imposed by the Aceh Party.

The Minister of Internal Affairs and the regional parliament persuaded him to reconsider his decision. The Minister of Internal Affairs remarked that he could accept resignation for health reason, but he would refuse to accept the resignation if it is related to performance.

Aceh Besar's parliament summoned Bukhari to a hearing several days later. Bukhari clarified his reasons with a written note to the parliament, stating that “the political and administrative climate was not healthy” and summing up Aceh's political condition as “Defeat and rule, or be defeated and ruled”. His rationale was rejected by the Ministry of Internal Affairs and Bukhari continued his tenure after being lobbied by the Aceh Besar's parliament.

=== Works and general assessment ===
During his tenure, Bukhari attempted to utilize local food sources, such as papaya and cattle, to improve the public welfare in the region. He supervised the formation of the Pulo Breuh region as an integrated gas and oil territory and the construction of projects by the Rehabilitation and Reconstruction Agency, an agency established to rebuild Aceh following the 2004 Indian Ocean earthquake and tsunami. Bukhari later criticized the agency due to the inadequate quality of the constructed facilities. Bukhari also oversaw the allocation of KUBE, a financial assistance program from the Ministry of Social Affairs, to his regency.

A general survey of the Aceh Besar population showed that most people were disappointed with Bukhari's government. Bukhari was considered unable to collaborate with Aceh Besar's parliament and had basic weaknesses in the context of leadership, conflict management and competition. In July 2011, the Youth Caucus of Aceh Besar assessed Bukhari's government as "failure without exception".

Bukhari ended his term on 1 March 2012 and he was replaced by his regional secretary Zulkifli Ahmad in an acting capacity.

== Later life and death ==
Bukhari resumed his career as an English language docent in the Syiah Kuala University. A day before his death, Bukhari applied for an early retirement from the university, but was refused by his superior.

Bukhari died at 01.45 on 11 February 2021 in his house, which was located in Lampeuneurut, Aceh Besar. Bukhari suffered from heart complications several days before his death. A funeral prayer, led by his son Putra El-Mukram, was held several hours after his death. Bukhari was buried on the same day in the Lampeuneurut Public Cemetery.

== Personal life ==
Bukhari was married to Maslaila. The marriage resulted in four children (3 girls and a boy).
