= Rana Talia Muhammad Khan =

Inspector-General of Police in British India (1884–1959)

Rana Talia Muhammad Khan 1884-1959
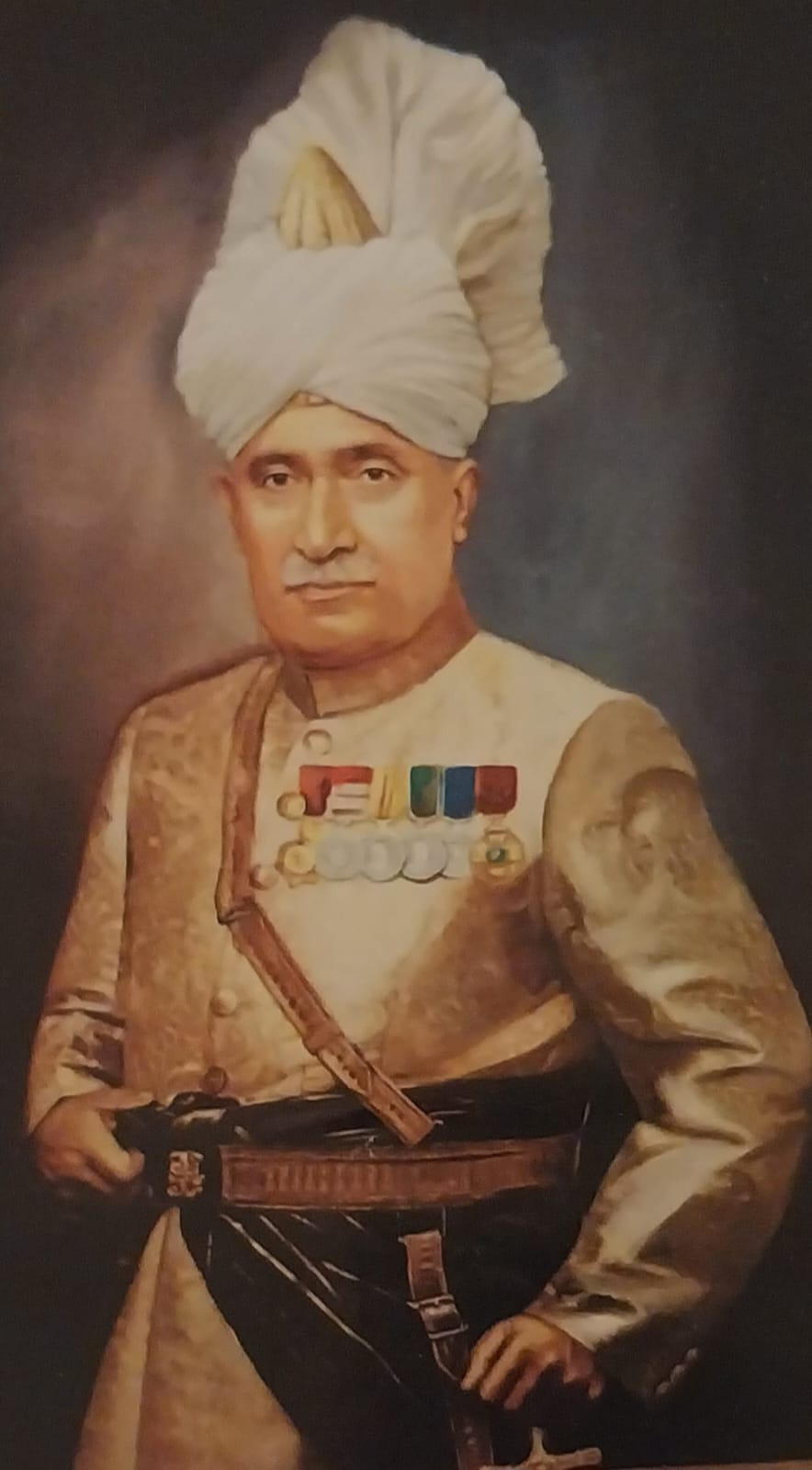
- Painting of Rana Talia Muhammad Khan, Inspector General of Patiala State.
- Born: 14 December 1884; Patiala, Punjab, British Indian Empire
- Died: 1959
- Citizenship: (Pakistan) Pakistani (post-1947) (British Raj) British Indian (pre-1947)
- Occupations: Inspector-General of Police Patiala State and North West Frontier Province and Major in Queen Victoria's Own Corps of Guides, British Indian Army
- Known for: First Muslim Inspector-General of Police in British India
- Children: Bakhtiar Rana (son); Begum Akhtar Sultan (daughter); Dildar Rana (son); Begum Qamar Sultan (daughter); Nisar Rana (son); Begum Riffat (daughter)
- Parent: Rana Jalaluddin (father)

Khan Bahadur Rana Talia Muhammad Khan, O.B.E. (14 December 1884 – 1959) was the first Muslim Inspector-General of Police in British India, serving as Inspector-General of Police of Patiala State and the North-West Frontier Province and a former British Indian Army officer. He served famously as Superintendent of Police, Kohat and District Officer, Frontier Constabulary, Hangu and, during the Second World War, as a Major in Queen Victoria's Own Corps of Guides, British Indian Army (now the Guides Cavalry in the Pakistan Army).

== Early life ==
Rana Talia Muhammad Khan was born on 14 December 1884 in a Muslim Naru Rajput family in Patiala, Punjab, British Indian Empire.

== Police career ==
Rana Talia Muhammad Khan joined the Indian Civil Service (commonly known as the Imperial Civil Service (ICS) or British India Civil Service) as Deputy Superintendent of Police.

A famous incident in his life, whilst serving as Superintendent of Police, Kohat, became the basis of a story in M. M. Kaye's novel, The Far Pavilions, which was also made into a movie. The incident is narrated in Victoria Schofield's book Afghan Frontier: Feuding and Fighting in Central Asia. Schofield writes:

"In February 1923 over forty rifles were stolen from the police station in Kohat. The leader of the gang was Ajab Khan, a known rifle thief and suspected murderer of a British couple three years previously. After careful negotiations and secret meetings on the part of the Superintendent of Police, Rana Talia Muhammad, some rifles were returned. But those remaining with Ajab and his brother Shahzada were not surrendered, so Rana arranged for a raid on Ajab's house. The two brothers were away, but in order to escape the wrath of the British the other men disguised themselves as women; they might have avoided detection but for their large feet which gave them away. The rifles were discovered and to make matters worse, their women jeered at them for having tried to escape the danger by posing as women." (p. 130)

He retired as Inspector-General of Police in 1937.

== Military service ==
At the outbreak of the Second World War, Rana Talia Muhammad Khan was called out of retirement by the British Indian Government and made a Major in Queen Victoria's Own Corps of Guides, British Indian Army.

== Recognition ==
For his meritorious services, Rana Talia Muhammad Khan was conferred the medal and title of "Khan Sahib" and later "Khan Bahadur" by the British Indian Government.

On 1 January 1945, for his meritorious services, Rana Talia Muhammad Khan, was conferred the title of "Additional Officer of the Military Division" of the Order of the British Empire (O.B.E.) by King George VI.

== Family ==
Rana Talia Muhammad Khan had three sons and three daughters. He was the father of Lieutenant General Bakhtiar Rana, Chief Martial Law Administrator (West Pakistan) and Commander, I Corps, Pakistan Army (1958–66) and father-in-law of Amir Habibullah Khan Saadi, the pre-1947 Indian freedom fighter and post-1947 Pakistani political leader.

== Sources ==
- Schofield, Victoria, Afghan Frontier: Feuding and Fighting in Central Asia, London: Tauris Parke Paperbacks (2003)
- Schofield, Victoria, Every Rock, Every Hill: The Plain Tale of the North-West Frontier and Afghanistan, London: Century Hutchinson (1987)
- "No. 36866". The London Gazette (11th supplement). 29 December 1944. p. 12.
- "C.E. Bruce departure from Kohat (NWFP) in June 1923 - where he was Deputy Commissioner (with police here)" Royal Geographical Society, 1923, Image number: S0015451
