= The Principles of State and Government in Islam =

1961 (revised 1980) book by Muhammad Asad

- Author: Muhammad Asad
- Language: English
- Subject: Law, Islamic Law
- Genre: Non-fiction
- Publisher: University of California Press
- Publication date: 1961
- Publication place: United States
- Media type: Print (Hardcover, Paperback)
- Pages: 128 pp
- ISBN: 9789839154092

The Principles of State and Government in Islam is a book written by Muhammad Asad. It was originally published in 1961 by University of California Press, and a revised edition was published in 1980 by Islamic Book Trust.

== Contents ==
- The Issues Before Us
- Terminology and Historical Precedent
- Government by Consent and Council
- Relationship Between Executive and Legislature
- The Citizens and The Government
- Conclusion

== See also ==
- Timeline of Muhammad Asad's life
- The Message of The Qur'an
- The Road to Mecca
- This Law of Ours and Other Essays
