= Bakhra =

- village
- Location in Bihar, India Bakhra (India)
- Coordinates: 26°2′0″N 85°6′0″E
- Country: India
- State: Bihar
- District: Muzaffarpur

Population (2011)
  - Total: 7,998

Languages
  - Official: Maithili, Hindi
- Time zone: UTC+5:30 (IST)
- ISO 3166 code: IN-BR
- Vehicle registration: BR-
- Coastline: 0 kilometres (0 mi)

Bakhra is a village in Muzaffarpur district in the Indian state of Bihar.

It is the site of an Ashoka pillar that was still standing in 1932 and a stupa.
