= This Law of Ours and Other Essays =

Book by Muhammad Asad

- Author: Muhammad Asad
- Language: English
- Subject: Islamic Law, Islam, Pakistan
- Genre: Non-fiction
- Publisher: Dar al-Andalus
- Publication date: 1987
- Publication place: Pakistan, India
- Media type: Print (Hardcover, Paperback)
- Pages: 195 pp
- ISBN: 9839154109

This Law of Ours and Other Essays is a book written by Muhammad Asad, first published by Dar al-Andalus, Gibraltar in 1987. The book is a collection of Asad's writings, lectures and radio broadcasts—some written as far back as the 1940s—which aims to clarify some of the confusion in the Muslim Ummah about the scope and practical implications of Islamic law.

The book's preface was written by Pola Hamida, Asad's wife, who first gathered his writings and radio talks and persuaded him to publish a book. In the preface, Hamida points out that the reader will be struck "not only by the extraordinary timeliness and timelessness of these thoughts and predictions, but also by their great consistency."

== Argument ==
Asad points out what is incumbent on a Muslim: namely, belief in the "Oneness of God" — indivisible in His existence, unattainable by human thought, all-embracing in His wisdom and power — and in the apostleship of Muhammad.

A large portion of the book elaborates on Islamic and western civilization and Muslim law. In particular, it deals with the role of ijtihad and the creative outlook of Muhammad's companions and the great jurists of the past, on the necessity for independent thinking grounded in the Qur'an and the Sunnah of Muhammad. It also contains the author's perspective on the ideological basis of Pakistan as well as on Islam's encounter with the west.

== Table of contents ==
The essays contained in the book represent Asad's work and thought from the mid-1940s to 1987. The following essays are included:

- This Law of Ours

- Prolegomena
- A Time of Change
- Talking of Muslim Revival
- Whose is the Fault?
- A New Approach
- The Basis of Our Civilization
- Islamic Civilization and Islamic Law
- Discussing a Proposition
- The Companions and the Law
- A New Development
- Imitation of Thought
- A Voice from Nine Hundred Years Ago
- Creative Acceptance
- Summing Up

- What Do We Mean by Pakistan

- Looking at Ourselves
- The Uniqueness of Pakistan
- Evasion and Self-deception
- The Choice Before Us
- The Time for a Decision
- Our Moral Stature

- Calling All Muslims
- The Encounter of Islam and the West
- Islam and the Spirit of Our Times
- The Answers of Islam
- Jerusalem: The Open City
- A Vision to Jerusalem
- The Meaning and Significance of the Hijrah
- The Message of the Quran

== See also ==
- Timeline of Muhammad Asad's life
- The Message of The Qur'an
- The Road to Mecca
- The Principles of State and Government in Islam
