= The Message of The Qur'an =

Book by Muhammad Asad

- Author: Muhammad Asad
- Language: English
- Subject: Translation, Quran
- Genre: Religious text
- Publisher: Dar al-Andalus Limited
- Publication date: 1980
- Media type: Print (Hardcover, Paperback)
- Pages: 1200 pp
- ISBN: 1904510000

The Message of The Qur'an is an English translation and interpretation of the 1924 Cairo edition of the Qur'an by Muhammad Asad, an Austrian Jew who converted to Islam. It is considered one of the most influential Quranic translations of the modern age. The book was first published in Gibraltar in 1980, and has since been translated into several other languages.

Asad meant to devote two years to completing the translation and the commentary but ended up spending seventeen. In the opening, he dedicates his effort to "People Who Think". The author returns to the theme of Ijtihad - The use of one's own faculties to understand the Divine text - again and again. The spirit of the translation is resolutely modernist, and the author expressed his profound debt to the reformist commentator Muhammad Abduh. In the foreword to the book, he writes "...although it is impossible to 'reproduce' the Quran as such in any other language, it is none the less possible to render its message comprehensible to people who, like most Westerners, do not know Arabic...well enough to find their way through it unaided." He also states that a translator must take into account the ijaz of the Qur'an, which is the ellipticism which often "deliberately omits intermediate thought-clauses in order to express the final stage of an idea as pithily and concisely as is possible within the limitations of a human language" and that "the thought-links which are missing - that is, deliberately omitted - in the original must be supplied by the translator...".

== Reception ==
The Message of The Qur'an received favorable reviews from discriminating scholars. Gai Eaton, a leading British Muslim thinker, after noting the limitations of Asad's rationalist approach, described Asad's translation as "the most helpful and instructive version of the Qur'an that we have in English. This remarkable man has done what he set out to do, and it may be doubted whether his achievement will ever be surpassed."

Considered one of the leading translations of the Qur'an, it has been criticized by some Atharis for its Ash'ari leanings. The book was banned in Saudi Arabia in 1974 (before its publication) due to differences on some creedal issues compared with the Wahhabi ideology prevalent there.

== Contents ==
Following is a list of 114 Chapters (Surahs) of Quran, their Arabic names and their English translations as produced by Muhammad Asad:

1. Al Fatiha (The Opening)
2. Al Baqara (The Cow)
3. Al 'Imran (The Family of 'Imran)
4. Al Nisa' (Women)
5. Al Ma'idah (The Repast)
6. Al An'am (Cattle)
7. Al A'raf (The Faculty of Discernment)
8. Al Anfal (Spoils of War)
9. Al Tawbah (Repentance)
10. Yunus (Jonah)
11. Hud
12. Yusuf (Joseph)
13. Al Ra'd (Thunder)
14. Ibrahim (Abraham)
15. Al-Hijr
16. Al Nahl (The Bee)
17. Al Isra' (The Night Journey)
18. Al Kahf (The Cave)
19. Maryam (Mary)
20. Ta Ha (O Man)
21. Al Anbiya' (The Prophets)
22. Al Hajj (The Pilgrimage)
23. Al Mu'minun (The Believers)
24. Al Nur (The Light)
25. Al Furqan (The Standard of True and False)
26. Al Shu'ara (The Poets)
27. Al Naml (The Ants)
28. Al Qasas (The Story)
29. Al 'Ankabut (The Spider)
30. Al Rum (The Byzantines)
31. Luqman
32. Al Sajdah (Prostration)
33. Al Ahzab (The Confederates)
34. Saba' (Sheba)
35. Fatir (The Originator)
36. Ya Sin (O Thou Human Being)
37. Al Saffat (Those Ranged in Ranks)
38. Sad
39. Al Zumar (The Throngs)
40. Ghafir (Forgiving)
41. Fussilat (Clearly Spelled Out)
42. Al Shura (Consultation)
43. Al Zukhruf (Gold)
44. Al Dukhan (Smoke)
45. Al Jathiyah (Kneeling Down)
46. Al Ahqaf (The Sand-Dunes)
47. Muhammad
48. Al Fath (Victory)
49. Al Hujurat (The Private Apartments)
50. Qaf
51. Al Dhariyat (The Dust-Scattering Winds)
52. Al Tur (Mount Sinai)
53. Al Najm (The Unfolding)
54. Al Qamar (The Moon)
55. Al Rahman (The Most Gracious)
56. Al Waqi'ah (That Which Must Come to Pass)
57. Al Hadid (Iron)
58. Al Mujadilah (The Pleading)
59. Al Hashr (The Gathering)
60. Al Mumtahinah (The Examined One)
61. Al Saff (The Ranks)
62. Al Jumu'ah (The Congregation)
63. Al Munafiqun (The Hypocrites)
64. Al Taghabun (Loss and Gain)
65. Al Talaq (Divorce)
66. Al Tahrim (Prohibition)
67. Al Mulk (Dominion)
68. Al Qalam(The Pen)
69. Al Haqqah (The Laying-Bare of the Truth)
70. Al Ma'arij (The Ways of Ascent)
71. Nuh (Noah)
72. Al Jinn (The Unseen Beings)
73. Al Muzzammil (The Enwrapped One)
74. Al Muddaththir (The Enfolded One)
75. Al Qiyamah (Resurrection)
76. Al Insan (Man)
77. Al Mursalat (Those Sent Forth)
78. Al Naba' (The Tiding)
79. Al Nazi'at (Those That Rise)
80. 'Abasa (He Frowned)
81. Al Takwir (Shrouding in Darkness)
82. Al Infitar (The Cleaving Asunder)
83. Al Mutaffifin (Those Who Give Short Measure)
84. Al Inshiqaq (The Splitting Asunder)
85. Al Buruj (The Great Constellation)
86. Al Tariq (That Which Comes in the Night)
87. Al A'la (The All-Highest)
88. Al Ghashiyah (The Overshadowing Event)
89. Al Fajr (The Daybreak)
90. Al Balad (The Land)
91. Al Shams (The Sun)
92. Al Layl (The Night)
93. Al Duha (The Bright Morning Hours)
94. Al Sharh (The Opening-Up of the Heart)
95. Al Tin (The Fig)
96. Al Alaq (The Germ-Cell)
97. Al Qadr (Destiny)
98. Al Bayyinah (The Evidence of Truth)
99. Al Zalzalah (The Earthquake)
100. Al 'Adiyat (The Chargers)
101. Al Qari'ah (The Sudden Calamity)
102. Al Takathur (Greed for More and More)
103. Al 'Asr (The Flight of Time)
104. Al Humazah (The Slanderer)
105. Al Fil (The Elephant)
106. Quraysh
107. Al Ma'un (Assistance)
108. Al Kawthar (Good in Abundance)
109. Al Kafirun (Those Who Deny the Truth)
110. Al Nasr (Succour)
111. Al Masad (The Twisted Strands
112. Al Ikhlas (The Declaration of [God's] Perfection)
113. Al Falaq (The Rising Dawn)
114. Al Nas (Men)
- Appendices:
  - I. Symbolism and Allegory in the Qur'an
  - II. Al-Muqatta'at
  - III. On the Term and Concept of Jinn
  - IV. The Night Journey

== See also ==
- List of surahs in the Quran
- Quran translations
- Timeline of Muhammad Asad's life
- The Road to Mecca
- This Law of Ours and Other Essays
- The Principles of State and Government in Islam
