= The Road to Mecca (book) =

Book by Muhammad Asad

- Author: Muhammad Asad
- Language: English
- Subject: Autobiography, Religion
- Genre: Memoir, Travelogue
- Publisher: Simon and Schuster
- Publication date: August 1954
- Publication place: United States
- Media type: Print (Hardcover, Paperback)
- Pages: 386 pp
- ISBN: 9781887752374

The Road to Mecca, also known as Road to Mecca or Road to Makkah, is the autobiography of Muslim scholar, intellectual, political theorist and spiritual writer Muhammad Asad.

== Reception ==
The book received critical acclaim upon publication, including reviews in prestigious New York City periodicals. One reviewer, writing in New York Herald Tribune Book Review, called it an “intensely interesting and moving book.”

New York World-Telegram wrote:

As suffused with Arab lore as Sir Richard Burton and almost as adventuresome as T.E. Lawrence, Muhammad Asad offers a similar blend of daring action and thoughtful observation. In addition, he surpasses either of these great predecessors as a prose stylist and interpreter of the Islamic faith

== Theatre Dramatisation ==
The Road to Mecca was dramatised into a one-man show, Desert Thirsts and Jerusalem Winds, which debuted at the Edinburgh Fringe Festival 2024. The play was then adapted to suit a cast of four and performed at the Cambridge ADC Theatre in 2025. The play has since been performed at Hoxton Hall in 2026.

== See also ==
- The Message of The Qur'an
- This Law of Ours and Other Essays
- The Principles of State and Government in Islam
