= Quran translations into English =

Following is a list of English translations of the Quran. The first translations were created in the 17th and 19th centuries by non-Muslims, but the majority of existing translations have been produced in the 20th and 21st centuries.

The earliest known English translation is The Alcoran (1649) which is attributed to Alexander Ross, chaplain to King Charles I. It was translated from the French translation, L'Alcoran de Mahomet, by the Sieur du Ryer.

The Koran, Commonly Called the Alcoran of Mohammed (1734) was the first scholarly translation of the Quran and was the most widely available English translation for 200 years and is still in print. George Sale based this two-volume translation on the Latin translation by Louis Maracci (1698). Thomas Jefferson had a copy of Sale's translation, now in the Library of Congress, that was used for House Representative Keith Ellison's oath of office ceremony on 3 January 2007.

Muslims did not begin translating the Quran into English until the early 20th century. The Qur'an (1910) was translated by Mirza Abul Fazl of Allahabad, India. He was the first Muslim to present a translation of the Quran in English. The English Translation of the Holy Qur'an with Commentary (1917), translated by Maulana Muhammad Ali, was "the first English translation by an Ahmadiyyah follower to be generally available and to be made accessible to the West." Muhammad Ali was the leader of the Lahori Ahmadis. Wallace Fard Muhammad, the founder of the Nation of Islam, exclusively used Ali's translation.

The Koran Interpreted (1955) by Arthur Arberry was the first English translation of the Quran by an academic scholar of Arabic, Islam, and Sufism. Arberry attempted to maintain the rhythms and cadence of the Arabic text. For many years, it was the scholarly standard for English translations.

The Holy Qur'an: Arabic Text and English Translation (1990) was the first translation by a Muslim woman, Amatul Rahman Omar.

The Noble Quran: Meaning With Explanatory Notes (2007) by Taqi Usmani is the first English translation of the Quran written by a traditionalist Deobandi scholar.

In October 2023, a new translation of the Quran by Zafarul-Islam Khan was released as The Glorious Quran — English Translation with Annotations Based on Earliest Authoritative Sources.

== Non-Muslim translations ==
- The Alcoran, Translated Out of Arabic into French. By the Andrew du Ryer, Lord of Malezair, and Resident for the French King, at Alexandria. And Newly Englished, for the Satisfaction of all that Desire to Look into the Turkish Vanities. London: Anno Dom, 1649.
- The Koran, Commonly Called the Alcoran of Mohammed, tr. into English Immediately from the Original Arabic; with Explanatory Notes, Taken from the Most Approved Commentators. To Which Is Prefixed a Preliminary Discourse. Translated by George Sale. London: C. Ackers, 1734, available online at al-quran.info.
- The Koran. Translated by John Medows Rodwell. London: J. M. Dent & Sons Ltd., 1861.
- The Quran. Translated by E.H. Palmer. Oxford: Clarendon Press, 1880. (Note: Palmer was a Cambridge scholar entrusted with the preparation of the new translation for Max Muller's Sacred Books of the East series.)
- The Qur'an: Translated, with a Critical Re-arrangement of the Surahs. Translated by Richard Bell. Edinburgh: T. & T. Clark, 1939. (Note: Bell was a lecturer in Arabic studies at Edinburgh University.)
- The Koran Interpreted. 2 volumes. Translated by Arthur Arberry. New York: Macmillan, 1955.
- The Koran: A New Translation. Translated by N. J. Dawood. New York: Penguin, 1956. (Note: Dawood was a native Arabic speaker from Iraq's now-defunct Jewish community. He preferred comprehensibility to literalism in translation, making his version easier to read. The first edition of the Dawood translation rearranged the chapters into approximate chronological order, but later editions restored the traditional sequence. His version was criticise by Ziauddin Sardar, as "violent and sexist" in comparison to more modern translations published by The Guardian.)
- The Qur'an: A New Translation. Translated by Thomas Cleary. United States: Starlatch Press, 2004. ISBN 9781929694440. (Note: Cleary is a well-known California-based translator of numerous Buddhist works. His translation was based on an earlier partial translation, which the American Muslim scholar Hamza Yusuf highly praised.)
- The Qur'an. Translated by Alan Jones. Edinburgh: Edinburgh University Press, 2007. ISBN 978-0906094648 (Note: Jones is an Arabist and retired lecturer at Oxford University.)
- The Qur'an: A New Annotated Translation. Translated by Arthur J. Droge. Sheffield: Equinox Publishing Limited, 2012. ISBN 978-1845539443
- The Qur'an (Norton Critical Editions). Translated by Jane Dammen McAuliffe. New York: W. W. Norton & Company, 2017. ISBN 978-0-393-92705-4. (Note: McAuliffe's version is based on the Pickthall translation.)
- The Critical Qur'an: Explained from Key Islamic Commentaries and Contemporary Historical Research. Translated by Robert Spencer. New York: Bombardier Books, 2022. ISBN 978-1642939491

== Ahmadi translations ==
- The Holy Qur'an. Translated by Mohammad Khan. Patiala: Rajinder Press, 1905. (Note: Mohammad Khan's translation reflects an Ahmadiyya worldview.)
- The English Translation of the Holy Qur'an with Commentary. Translated by Maulana Muhammad Ali. Punjab: 1917. (Note: A revised edition was published in 1951; Ali spent the last five years of his life working towards it. It was redesigned with a new typeface and an expanded index in 2002.)
- The Holy Quran: Arabic Text and English Translation.Translated by Maulvi Sher Ali. Netherlands: 1955. ISBN 1-85372-314-2
- The English Commentary of the Holy Quran. 5 volumes. Translated by Maulvi Sher Ali, Mirza Bashir Ahmad and Malik Ghulam Farid. Ahmadiyya Muslim Community, 1963.
- The Wonderful Koran: A New English Translation. Translated by Pir Salahuddin. Eminabad: The Raftar-I-Zamana Publications, 1969.
- The Quran. Translated by Muhammad Zafrulla Khan. London: Curzon Press, 1970.
- The Holy Qur'an: Arabic Text and English Translation.Translated by Amatul Rahman Omar and Abdul Mannan Omar. Noor Foundation International, Inc., 1990. ISBN 0976697238. (Note: Amatul Rahman Omar was the first woman to translate the Qur'an into English, working with her husband Abdul Mannan Omar.)

== Intra-faith translations ==
- The Study Quran: A New Translation and Commentary (2015). Edited by Seyyed Hossein Nasr, Caner K. Dagli, Maria Massi Dakake, Joseph E. B. Lumbard, and Mohammed Rustom.New York: HarperOne, 2015. ISBN 978-0061125867. (Note: Features verse-by-verse commentaries and essays by both Shiite and Sunni scholars.)
- Verbatim Quran: A New Translation based on Arabic-English Cognates (2023).

|url=http://verbatimquran.com/

== Quranist translations ==
- Quran: The Final Testament. Translated by Rashad Khalifa. Islamic Productions, 1981. ISBN 9780934894760. (Note: Rashad Khalifa is a controversial teacher and computer scientist. He claimed to have used mathematics and computers to find hidden meanings in the Qur'an.)
- Exposition of the Holy Quran. Translated by Ghulam Ahmed Pervez. Lahore: Tolu-E-Islam Trust, 1996. (Note: This is an English translation of the Urdu translation, Mafhum-al-Quran (1961).)
- The Qur'an As It Explains Itself. Translated by Shabbir Ahmed. Bedford: Lighthouse, 2003. ISBN 9780974787985. (Note: The translation attempts to explain Qur'anic verses by cross-references within the Qur'an.)
- The Quran: A Reformist Translation. Translated by Edip Yuksel, Layth Saleh al-Shaiban, and Martha Schulte-Nafeh. London: Brainbow Press, 2007. ISBN 978-0979671500. (Note: They claim to offer a non-sexist understanding of the text.)
- The Message – A Translation of the Glorious Qur'an. Translated by the Monotheistic Group. London: Brainbow Press, 2008.ISBN 978-0979671548
- The Qur’an: A Complete Revelation. Translated by Sam Gerrans. Quranite, 2016.ISBN 978-1-914385-04-9

== Shi'a translations ==
- The Qur'an. Translated by Mirza Abul Fazl. Allahabad: Asgar & Co., 1911. (Note: This volume includes Arabic text and English translation arranged chronologically. It also includes an abstract (Allahabad).)
- The Qur'an. Translated by Mohammed Habib Shakir. New York: Tahirke Tarsile Qur'an, 1968.
- The Holy Qur'an: The Arabic Text and English Translation (1981). Translated by Muhammad Sarwar. Englewood: The Islamic Seminary Inc., 1981.
- The Holy Qur'an. Translated by Syed V. Mir Ahmed Ali. Tehran: Osweh Printing & Publication Co., 1988. ISBN 9780940368842
- The Quran: A Poetic Translation. Translated by Fazlollah Nikayin. 2000. ISBN 978-0967473208. (Note: This translation attempts a poetic rendering of the Qur'an.)
- The Qur'an in Persian and English. Translated by Tahere Saffarzadeh. 2001.
- The Qur'an with an English Paraphrase, Translated by Ali Quli Qara'i. Iranian Centre for Translation of the Holy Qur'an/Islamic Publications International, 2005. ISBN 978-1904063179.
- The Sublime Qur'an. Translated by Laleh Bakhtiar. Chicago: Kazi Publications, Inc., 2007. ISBN 978-1567447507. (Note: This was claimed to be the first solo translation of the Qur'an by an American woman. The Sahih international (1997) version, was translated by three American women. It has also been called a feminist translation.)
- The Magnificent Qur'an: A 21st Century English Translation.Translated by Ali Salami. Tempe: Leilah Publication, 2016. ISBN 099633386X.
- The Exalted Qurʾān: A New English Translation. translated by Dr Sayyid Amjad H. Shah Naqavi. London: The Shīʿah Institute, 2024.

== Sunni translations ==
- The Koran. Translated by Hairat Dihlawi. Delhi: M. H. Press, 1916.
- The Meaning of the Glorious Koran. Translated by Muhammad Marmaduke Pickthall. New York: A. A. Knopf, 1930. (Note: An English convert to Islam penned this translation at the behest of the Emir of Hyderabad while on a sojourn in India. Pickthall's widely printed translation was regarded as "an important milestone in the long course of Koranic interpretation" by later esteemed Qur'an translator A. J. Arberry, who also noted a few problems with Pickthall's verse numbering, which deviated in places from what had by then become the standard Arabic edition by Gustav Fluegel.), Available online at al-quran.info and islamawakened.org.
- The Holy Qur'an: Translation and Commentary. Translated by Abdullah Yusuf Ali. Lahore: Shaik Muhammad Ashraf Publishers of Bakhshi Bazaar, 1934. (Note: The anglophile British-Indian Abdullah Yusuf Ali undertook this work at a time when the Qur'an had yet never been properly presented in English from a Shia perspective and only non-Muslim translations were available, which were sometimes overly unsympathetic. It has become one of the most widely used English editions of the Qur'an due to the quality of the translation and its use of extensive footnotes. In the 1980s, the book was appropriated by the Saudi religious establishment and edited to fit the country's Wahhabi/Salafist perspective. This latter version is today widely distributed as the Amana Edition.)
- Tafseer-e-Majidi Translated by Abdul Majid Daryabadi. India: 1957.
- The Running Commentary of the Holy Qur-an with Under-Bracket Comments. Translated by Khadim Rahmani Nuri of Shillong, India: Sufi Hamsaya-Gurudwar, 1964.
- The Meaning of the Qur'an.Translated by Muhammad Akbar. Lahore: 1967. (Note: This is the first English translation of Abul Ala Maududi's original Urdu translation of the Qur'an.)
- The Message of the Qur'an: Presented in Perspective (1974) Translated by Hashim Amir Ali. Rutland: C. E. Tuttle Co., 1974. ISBN 978-0-8048-0976-4. (Note: The suras are presented in chronological order.)
- The Message of the Qur'an. Translated by Muhammad Asad. Gibraltar: Dar al-Andalus Limited, 1980. ISBN 1904510000. (Note: Muhammad Asad.is a Jewish convert to Islam.)
- The Qur'an: The First American Version. Translated by Thomas Ballantyne Irving (Al Hajj Ta'lim Ali Abu Nasr). Brattleboro: Amana Books, 1985. (Note: Irving is a Canadian Muslim who is an author, professor, translator, and activist. His English-only edition uses a North American vernacular.)
- Al-Qur'an: A Contemporary Translation. Translated by Ahmed Ali. Princeton: Princeton University Press, 1988. ISBN 9780691073293
- The Clarion Call of the Eternal Quran. Translated by Muhammad Khalilur Rahman. Dhaka: 1991.
- The Glorious Qur'an. Translated by Ahmad Zidan and Mrs. Dina Zidan. Zidan, 1993. ISBN 978-0951811504
- A Simple Translation of The Holy Quran. Translated by Mir Aneesuddin. Hyderabad: Islamic Academy of Sciences, 1993. (Note: This translation uses Simple English, also called basic English.)
- The Glorious Qur'an. Translated by Syed Vickar Ahamed. Kuala Lumpur: TR Group of Companies, 1999. ISBN 983-40085-03
- The Holy Qur'an. Translated by Emily B. Assami (Umm Muhammad), Amatullah J. Bantley, and Mary M. Kennedy. Jeddah: Dar Abul Qasim Publishing House, 1997. (Note: This is a translation by three American women converts, naming themselves Saheeh International.)
- Al-Qur'an: Guidance for Mankind. Translated by M. Farooq-e-Azam Malik. Dearborn: The Institute of Islamic Knowledge, 1997. ISBN 978-0911119800
- Towards Understanding the Ever-glorious Qur'an. Translated by Muhammad Mahmoud Ghali. Cairo: Publishing House for Universities, 1997.
- The Noble Qur'an: A New Rendering of Its Meaning in English (1999) Translated by Abdalhaqq Bewley and Aisha Bewley. London: Madinah Press, 1999. ISBN 9781874216360. (Note: The husband-and-wife team behind this translation are disciples of Abdalqadir as-Sufi)
- Interpretation of the Meanings of the Noble Qur'an. Translated by Muhammad Muhsin Khan and Muhammad Taqi-ud-Din al-Hilali. Chicago: Kazi Publications Inc., 1999. ISBN 978-1567444995. (Note: This translation is among the most widely read translations in the world.)
- The Majestic Qur'an: An English Rendition of Its Meanings. Translated by Nureddin Uzunoğlu, Tevfik Rüştü Topuzoğlu, Ali Özek, and Mehmet Maksutoğlu. United States: Starlatch Press, 2000. ISBN 9781929694501
- An Interpretation of the Qur'an (2000). Translated by Majid Fakhry. New York: NYU Press, 2002. ISBN 978-0814727232
- Translation and Commentary on The Holy Quran (2000). Translate by Zohurul Hoque. Holy Quran Publishing Project, 2000. ISBN 978-0967830407
- The Qur'an. Translated by M. J. Gohari. Oxford: Oxford Logos Society, 2002. ISBN 978-0953671670
- Quran: The Living Truth. Translated by Shaikh Basheer Ahmed Muhuyiddin. Kerala: Manas Foundation, 2003. ISBN 9788171513406
- The Tajwidi Qur'an. Translated by Nooruddeen Durkee. Charlottesville: An-noor Educational Foundation, 2003. (Note: This volume presents the Arabic text using a Romanized transliteration system that allows English-speaking readers to pronounce the Arabic. The English translation is an amalgamation of other translations.)
- The Qur'an (Oxford World Classics). Translated by M.A.S. Abdel-Haleem. Oxford: Oxford University Press, 2004. ISBN 978-0192805485
- Jamal Ul Qur'an (The Beauteous Qur'an). 3rd edition. Translated by Muhammad Karam Shah Al-Azhari and Anis Ahmad Sheikh. Lahore-Karachi: Zia-ul-Qur'an Publications, 2004.
- Quran Made Easy. Translated by Afzal Hoosen Elias. Karachi: Zam Zam Publishers, 2007. ISBN 978-9699145278
- The Meanings of the Noble Qur'an with Explanatory Notes, 2 volumes. Translated by Muhammad Taqi Usmani. Idarat al-Maarif, 2007. ISBN 9789695640005
- The Qur'an with Annotated Interpretation in Modern English. Translated by Ali Ünal. Clifton: Tughra Books, 2008. ISBN 9781597841443. (Note: The translator is a member of the Gülen Movement, a Turkish Islamic group.)
- The Gracious Qur'an: A Modern Phrased Interpretation in English. Translated by Ahmad Zaki Hammad. Reston: Lucent Interpretations, 2008. ISBN 978-0978784935
- The Qur'an: A New Translation. Translated by Tarif Khalidi. New York: Penguin Classics, 2008. ISBN 978-0143105886
- Irfan ul Quran. Translated by Muhammad Tahir-ul-Qadri. London: Minhaj-ul-Quran Publications, 2009.
- The Holy Qur'an: Guidance for Life. Translated by Yahiya Emerick. Islamic Foundation of North America/Amirah Publishing Co., 2010.
- The Easy Qur'an. Translated by Imtiaz Ahmad. Farmington Hills: Tawheed Center of Farmington Hills, 2010. ISBN 978-603-00-6359-8.
- The Quran: Translation and Commentary with Parallel Arabic Text. Translated by Maulana Wahiduddin Khan. India, Goodword, 2011. ISBN 9788178987460
- The Glorious Qur'an. Translated by Muhammad Tahir-ul-Qadri. London: Minhaj-ul-Quran Publications, 2011. ISBN 978-1908229007
- The Wise Qur'an: A Modern English Translation. Translated by Assad Nimer Busool. 2012
- Quran in English: Clear and Easy to Read. Translated by Talal Itani. Available at ClearQuran.com, 2012. ISBN 978-0986136801
- What is in the Quran? Message of the Quran in Simple English. Translated by Abdur Raheem Kidwai. New Delhi: Viva Books, 2013. ISBN 978-81-309-2363-5.
- Anwar-ul-Quran: The Holy Quran with English Translation. Translated by Fode Drame. Scotts Valley: CreateSpace Independent Publishing, 2014. ISBN 9781494887186
- The Clear Quran: A Thematic English Translation. Translated by Mustafa Khattab. St. Catharines: SirajPublications, 2015. ISBN 978-0-9948895-0-8.
- Noor Al Bayan. English. Translated by Sayed Jumaa Salam. Sacramento: Salam Educational Center, 2018. ISBN 978-1630750381
- The Majestic Quran: A Plain English Translation. Translated by Musharraf Hussain al Azhari. Nottingham: Invitation Publishing, 2018. ISBN 978-1-902248-65-3
- The Easy Quran: A Translation in Simple English. Translated by Tahir Mahmood Kiani. Ta-Ha Publishers Ltd. 2022, (originally published independently, 2019).ISBN 978-1915357007
- The Qur'an: A Translation for the 21st Century. Translated by Adil Salahi. Villa Park: The Islamic Foundation, 2019. ISBN 978-0860377504
- Bridges’ Translation of the Ten Qira’at of the Noble Qur’an. Translated by Bridges team, out of which Fadel Soliman is a main translator. AuthorHouse: Bridges Foundation, 2020. ISBN 978-1-7283-9074-1.
- The Qur'an Translated. Translated by D. Shehzad Saleem. Al-Mawrid, 2022. (Note: This is a translation of Javed Ahmed Ghamidi’s Urdu translation.)
- The Quran Beheld: An English Translation from the Arabic. Translated by Nuh Ha Mim Keller. Beltsville: Amana Publications, 2022. ISBN 978-1590080832.
- SureQuran: A collaborative effort by Talal Itani and artificial intelligence.
- The Glorious Quran - English Translation with annotations based on earliest authoritative sources by Zafarul-Islam Khan, Published in 2023 for Institute of Islamic and Arab Studies by Pharos Media & Publishing Pvt Ltd, New Delhi. (With parallel Arabic ISBN 978-81-7221-134-9) (English only edition: ISBN 978-81-7221-135-6)
- The Purple Quran Translation. Translated by Amr Abu Ayyub. Quranly Publishing, 2025. ISBN 9781910952207

== See also ==
- List of translations of the Quran
- List of tafsir works
- Quran oath controversy of the 110th United States Congress
- Quran translations
