= Quran translations =

Translations of the Islamic holy book

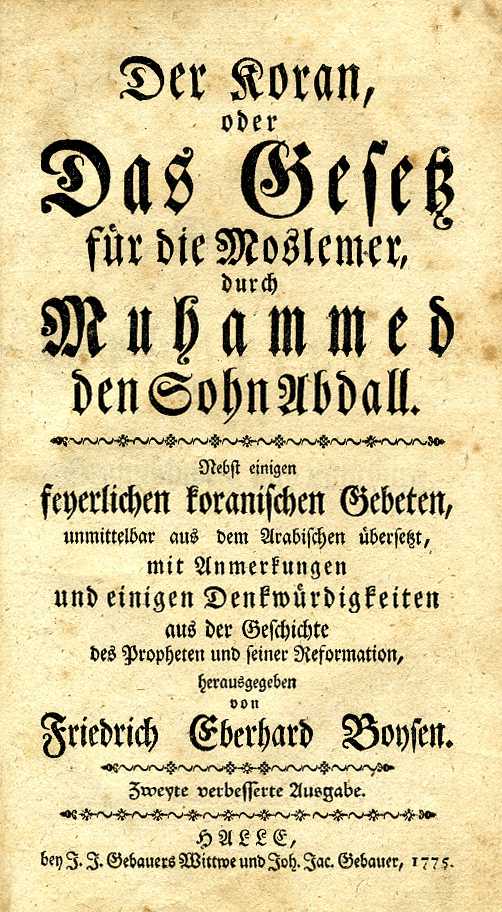
Title page of a German translation of the Qur'an published in 1775

There have been various Quran translations throughout history. Historically, most Muslims believed the Quran should only be read in the language it was revealed in (Classical Arabic) and saw no need for translation. Numerous translations by both Muslims and non-Muslims have been made (e.g. Mustafa Khattab's The Clear Quran, Alexander Ross' Alcoran de Mahomet, etc.).

According to Islamic theology, the Qur'an is a revelation in Arabic, and thus, it should only be recited in Quranic Arabic. Translations into other languages are the work of humans and so, according to Muslims, lose the unique impact and character of the Arabic original. Since these translations subtly change the meaning, they are often called "interpretations" or "translation[s] of the meanings" . For instance, Pickthall called his translation The Meaning of the Glorious Koran rather than simply The Koran.

== History ==
The first translation of the Qur'an was performed by Salman the Persian, who translated Surah al-Fatiha into the Middle Persian in the early seventh century. According to Islamic tradition contained in the hadith, the Negus of the Ethiopian Empire and the Byzantine Emperor Heraclius received letters from Muhammad containing verses from the Qur'an. However, during Muhammad's lifetime, no passage from the Qur'an was ever translated into these languages nor any other.

The second known translation was into Greek and was used by Nicetas Byzantius, a scholar from Constantinople, in his "Refutation of Qur'an" written between 855 and 870. However, we know nothing about who and for what purpose had made this translation. It is said that it was a complete translation.

The first fully attested complete translations of the Qur'an were done between the 10th and 12th centuries into Classical Persian. The Samanid Emperor, Mansur I (961–976), ordered a group of scholars from Khorasan to translate the Tafsir al-Tabari, originally in Arabic, into Persian. Later in the 11th century, one of the students of Khwaja Abdullah Ansari wrote a complete tafsir of the Qur'an in Persian. In the 12th century, Najm al-Din 'Umar al-Nasafi translated the Qur'an into Persian. The manuscripts of all three books have survived and have been published several times.

In 1936, translations in 102 languages were known. The Qur'an has been translated from the Arabic into most major African, Asian, and European languages.

=== European languages ===
==== Latin ====
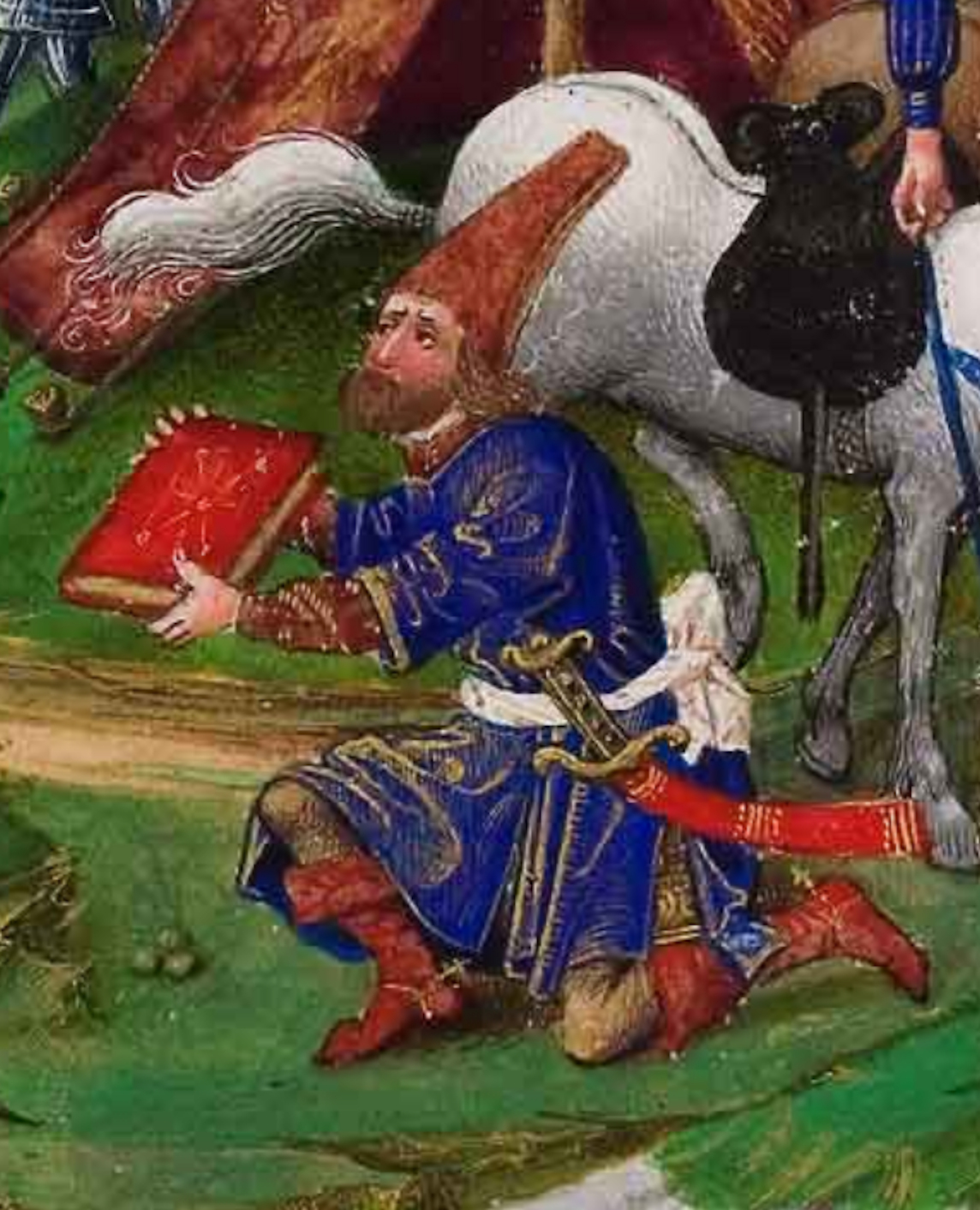
Bertrandon de la Broquière giving a Latin translation of the Qur'an to Philip the Good (detail). Illustration (folio 152v) by Jean Le Tavernier from BnF, MS fr. 9087, made in Lille in 1455.

Robertus Ketenensis produced the first Latin translation of the Qur'an in 1143 entitled Lex Mahumet pseudoprophete ("The law of Mahomet the pseudo prophet"). The translation was made at the behest of Peter the Venerable, abbot of Cluny, and currently exists in the Bibliothèque de l'Arsenal in Paris. Ketenensis' work was republished in 1543 in three editions by Theodore Bibliander at Basel. All editions contained a preface by Martin Luther. Many later European translations of the Qur'an merely translated Ketenensis' Latin version into their own language, as opposed to translating the Qur'an directly from Arabic.

In the early thirteenth century, Mark of Toledo made another, more literal, translation into Latin, which survives in several manuscripts. In the fifteenth century, Juan of Segovia produced another translation in collaboration with the Mudejar writer, Isa of Segovia. Only the prologue survives. In the sixteenth century, Juan Gabriel Terrolensis aided Cardenal Eguida da Viterbo in another translation into Latin. In the early seventeenth century, another translation was made, attributed to Cyril Lucaris.

In 1518, Juan Gabriel of Teruel (formerly known as Ali Alayzar), a Muslim convert to Christianity, prepared a Latin translation of the Quran for Giles of Viterbo, who had commissioned the translation for the purpose of converting Muslims to Christianity. Leo Africanus, a Muslim convert who was a godson of Giles of Viterbo, revised the translation in 1525. Surviving manuscripts of the translation are Cambridge MS Mm. v. 26 (C) and Milan MS D 100 inf. (M). MS D 100 Inf was copied by Scottish scholar David Colville in 1621, from a manuscript at the library of El Escorial in Spain. Colville later brought the manuscript to Milan. Today, it is archived at the Biblioteca Ambrosiana.

In 1622, the Genoese Jesuit priest Ignazio Lomellini (1560–1645) translated the Quran into Latin in the little-known Animadversiones, Notae ac Disputationes in Pestilentem Alcoranum (MS A-IV-4), a 1622 manuscript that is the oldest surviving example of a European translation of the Quran which also includes the complete original Arabic text.

Louis Maracci (1612–1700), a teacher of Arabic at the Sapienza University of Rome and confessor to Pope Innocent XI, issued an Arabic edition and a second Latin translation in 1698 in Padua. His edition contains the Qur'an's Arabic text with a Latin translation, annotations to further understanding and – embued by the time's spirit of controversy – an essay titled "Refutation of the Qur'an", where Marracci disproves Islam from the then Catholic point of view. Despite the Refutation's anti-Islamic tendency, Marracci's translation is accurate, suitably commented, and quotes many Islamic sources.

Marracci's translation too became the source of other European translations (one in France by Savory, and one in German by Nerreter). These later translations were quite inauthentic, and one even claimed to be published in Mecca in 1165 AH.

==== Modern languages ====
The first translation in a modern European language was in Castilian Spanish or Aragonese by the convert Juan Andrés (or so he claims in his Confusión o Confutación de la secta mahomética y del alcorán) but this translation is lost. A few dozen Qur'an verses in Castilian are found within the Confusión itself. There were lost translations in Catalan, one of them by Francesc Pons Saclota in 1382, the other appeared in Perpignan in 1384. Another Romance translation was made into Italian, 1547 by Andrea Arrivabene, derived from Ketenensis'. The Italian translation was used to derive the first German translation Salomon Schweigger in 1616 in Nuremberg, which in turn was used to derive the first Dutch translation in 1641.

The first French translation came out in 1647, and again in 1775, issued by André du Ryer. The Du Ryer translation also fathered many re-translations, most notably an English version by Alexander Ross in 1649. Ross' version was used to derive several others: a Dutch version by Glazemaker, a German version by Lange.

==== Circassian languages ====
Historically in Circassian society, the Quran was read in Arabic by a mullah, who would then translate and explain the text into the Circassian language for the congregation.

- The Adyghe translation of the Quran, "Meanings of the Quranic Verses", was prepared by Iskhak Mashbash and Pshimaf Koshbay. Faiz Autle and Daut Tlebzu served as Arabic language consultants.
- The Kabardian translation of the Quran, "The Quran and the Meanings of the Quranic Verses in Circassian (Kabardian)", was prepared by Mukhamed Khuazh, Mustafa Boliy and Zaur Nalo.

==== English ====
The earliest known translation of the Qur'an in any European language was the Latin works by Robert of Ketton at the behest of the Abbot of Cluny in c. 1143. This translation remained the only one until 1649 when the first English language translation was done by Alexander Ross, chaplain to King Charles I, who translated from a French work L'Alcoran de Mahomet by du Ryer.

In 1734, George Sale produced the first translation of the Qur'an direct from Arabic into English but relying heavily on O.M.D. Louis Maracci's Vatican Quran. Since then, there have been English translations by the clergyman John Medows Rodwell in 1861, and Edward Henry Palmer in 1880, both showing in their works several mistakes of mistranslation and misinterpretation. These were followed by Richard Bell in 1937 and Arthur John Arberry in the 1950s.

The Qur'an (1910) by Mirza Abul Fazl (1865–1956), a native of East Bengal (now Bangladesh), later moved to Allahabad, India. He was the first Muslim to present a translation of the Qur'an into English along with the original Arabic text. Among the contemporary Muslim scholars, Abul Fazl was a pioneer who took interest in the study of the chronological order of the Qur'an and drew the attention of Muslim scholars to its importance.

With the increasing population of English-speaking Muslims around the start of the 20th century, three Muslim translations of the Qur'an into English made their first appearance. The first was Muhammad Ali's 1917 translation, which is composed from an Ahmadiyya perspective, with some small parts being rejected as unorthodox by the vast majority of Muslims. This was followed in 1930 by the English convert to Islam Marmaduke Pickthall's more literalist translation.

Soon thereafter in 1934, Abdullah Yusuf Ali, published his translation, featuring copious explanatory annotation – over 6000 notes, generally being around 95% of the text on a given page, to supplement the main text of the translation. This translation has gone through over 30 printings by several different publishing houses, and is one of the most popular amongst English-speaking Muslims, alongside the Pickthall and Saudi-sponsored Hilali-Khan translations.

With few new English translations over the 1950–1980 period, these three Muslim translations were to flourish and cement reputations that were to ensure their survival into the 21st century, finding favor among readers often in newly revised updated editions. Orientalist Arthur Arberry's 1955 translation and native Iraqi Jew N. J. Dawood's unorthodox translation in 1956 were to be the only major works to appear in the post-war period. A. J. Arberry's The Koran Interpreted remains the scholarly standard for English translations, and is widely used by academics.

The English translation of Kanzul Iman is called The Treasure of Faith, which is translated by Farid Ul Haq. This translation is revered and higly respected by in barelvi circles. but scholar outside barelvi circles notes that Kanzul Iman adds phrases not in the Arabic Quran, like "apparently just looks human"https://islamawakened.com/quran/18/110/default.htm#gsc.tab=0 in 18:110—instead of the plain "I am only a human like you." This changes the meaning to fit Barelvi beliefs in the Prophet's special "light" nature, against the Quran's stress on his full humanity [18:110,17:93]. Classic scholars (Ibn Kathir, Tabari) never interpret it this way; it's a serious distortion (tahrif) of God's words.

Syed Abdul Latif's translation published in 1967, is regarded highly by some. He was a professor of English at Osmania University, Hyderabad. It was nevertheless short-lived due to criticism of his foregoing accuracy for the price of fluency.

The Message of the Qur'an: Presented in Perspective (1974) was published by Hashim Amir Ali. He translated the Qur'an into English and arranged it according to chronological order. Hashim Amir-Ali (1903-c. 1987) was a native of Salar Jung, Hyderabad State in the Deccan Plateau. In 1938, he came under the influence of Abul Fazl and took a deep interest in the study of the Qur'an, and was aware of the significance of the chronological order of the passages contained in it.

Another Jewish convert to Islam, Muhammad Asad's monumental work The Message of The Qur'an made its appearance for the first time in 1980.

Professor Ahmed Ali's Al-Qur'an: A Contemporary Translation (Akrash Publishing, Karachi, 1984, Reprinted by Oxford University Press, Delhi, 1987; Princeton University Press, New Jersey, 1988, with 9th reprinting 2001). Fazlur Rahman Malik of the University of Chicago writes, "It brings out the original rhythms of the Qur'anic language and the cadences. It also departs from traditional translations in that it gives more refined and differentiated shades of important concepts". According to Francis Edward Peters of New York University, "Ahmed Ali's work is clear, direct, and elegant – a combination of stylistic virtues seldom found in translations of the Qur'an. His is the best I have read."

At the cusp of the 1980s, the 1973 oil crisis, the Iranian Revolution, the Nation of Islam and a new wave of cold-war-generated Muslim immigrants to Europe and North America brought Islam squarely into the public limelight for the first time in Western Europe and North America. This resulted in a wave of translations as Western publishers tried to capitalize on the new demand for English translations of the Qur'an. Oxford University Press and Penguin Books were both to release editions at this time, as did indeed the Saudi Government, which came out with its own re-tooled version of the original Yusuf Ali translation. Canadian Muslim Professor T. B. Irving's 'modern English' translation (1985) was a major Muslim effort during that time.

Qur'an: The Final Testament, Islamic Productions, Tucson, Arizona, (1989) was published by Rashad Khalifa (رشاد خليفة; 19 November 1935 – 31 January 1990) Khalifa wrote that he was a messenger of God and that the archangel Gabriel 'most assertively' told him that chapter 36, verse 3, of the Qur'an, 'specifically' referred to him. He is referred to as God's Messenger of the Covenant by his followers. He wrote that the Qur'an contains a mathematical structure based on the number 19. He made the controversial claim that the last two verses of chapter nine in the Qur'an were not canonical, telling his followers to reject them. He reasoned that the verses disrupted an otherwise flawless nineteen-based pattern and were sacrilegious since they appeared to endorse worship of Muhammad. Khalifa's research received little attention in the West. In 1980, Martin Gardner mentioned it in Scientific American. Gardner later wrote a more extensive and critical review of Khalifa and his work.

The arrival of the 1990s ushered in the phenomenon of an extensive English-speaking Muslim population well-settled in Western Europe and North America. As a result, several major Muslim translations emerged to meet the ensuing demand. One of them was published in 1990, and it is by the first woman to translate the Qur'an into English, Amatul Rahman Omar, together with her husband, Abdul Mannan Omar. In 1991 appeared an English translation under the title: The Clarion Call Of The Eternal Qur-aan, by Muhammad Khalilur Rahman (b. 1906–1988), Dhaka, Bangladesh. He was the eldest son of Shamsul Ulama Moulana Muhammad Ishaque of Burdwan, West Bengal, India, – a former lecturer of Dhaka University.

In 1996 the Saudi government financed a new translation "the Hilali-Khan Qur'an" which was distributed free worldwide by the Saudi government. It has been criticized for being in line with their particular interpretation.

The Saheeh International Qur'an translation was published in 1997 in Saudi Arabia by three women converts. It remains extremely popular.

In 1999, a fresh translation of the Qur'an into English entitled The Noble Qur'an – A New Rendering of its Meaning in English by Abdalhaqq and Aisha Bewley was published by Bookwork, with revised editions being published in 2005 and 2011.

In 2000, The Majestic Qur'an: An English Rendition of Its Meanings was published by a committee of four Turkish Sunni scholars who have divided the work as follows: Nurettin Uzunoğlu translated Surahs (chapters) 1 to 8; Tevfik Rüştü Topuzoğlu: 9 to 20; Ali Özek: 21 to 39; Mehmet Maksutoğlu: 40 to 114. The translation comes with an extensive commentary and annotations in modern standard English, makes it easier to understand than the older translations.

The Qur'an in Persian and English (Bilingual Edition, 2001) features an English translation by the Iranian poet and author Tahereh Saffarzadeh. This was the third translation of the Qur'an into English by a woman, after Amatul Rahman Omar, and Aisha Bewley – and the first bilingual translation of the Qur'an.

In 2003, the English translation of the 8-volume Ma'ariful Qur'an was completed and the translation of the Qurʻan used for it was newly done by Taqi Usmani in collaboration with his brother Wali Raazi Usmani and his teachers, Professors Hasan Askari and Muhammad Shameem.

In 2004, a new translation of the Qur'an by Muhammad Abdel-Haleem was also published, with revised editions being published in 2005 and 2008.

In 2006, The Qur'an with Annotated Interpretation in Modern English by Ali Ünal was published. The work is more like a simplified tafsir (Qur'anic exegesis) than a translation. He uses modern English, and adds short notes between brackets amidst the translation when needed.

In 2007, Qur'an: a Reformist Translation by Edip Yüksel, Layth Saleh al-Shaiban, and Martha Schulte-Nafeh, was published.

In 2007, The Meanings of the Noble Qur'an with Explanatory Notes by Taqi Usmani was published. It has been published in 2 volumes at first and later, in a single volume. He also translated the Qur'an in simple Urdu, making him a translator of the Qur'an in dual languages.

In 2007 The Sublime Qur'an appeared by Laleh Bakhtiar; it is the second translation of the Qur'an by an American woman.

In 2008, Tarif Khalidi completed The Qur'an: A New Translation for Penguin Classics and Viking Press. It did not include commentary, so as to give readers a sense of how the earliest Muslims would have read and listened to the Qur'an. It serves as a replacement to Penguin Classics' older translation by NJ Dawood, although the Dawood translation remains in print.

In 2009, Wahiduddin Khan translated the Qur'an in English, which was published by Goodword Books entitled The Qur'an: Translation and Commentary with Parallel Arabic Text. This translation is considered as the easiest to understand due to simple and modern English. The pocket-size version of this translation with only English text is widely distributed as part of dawah work.

A rhymed verse edition of the entire Qur'an rendered in English by Thomas McElwain in 2010 includes rhymed commentary under the hardback title The Beloved and I, Volume Five, and the paperback title The Beloved and I: Contemplations on the Qur'an.

In 2015, Mustafa Khattab of Al-Azhar University completed The Clear Qur'an: A Thematic English Translation, after three years of collaboration with a team of scholars, editors, and proof-readers. Noted for its clarity, accuracy, and flow, this work is believed to be the first English translation done in Canada.

A Turkish Scholar Hakkı Yılmaz worked on the Qur'an through the root meanings of the Arabic words and published a study called Tebyin-ül Qur'an, and he also published a Division by Division Interpretation in the Order of Revelation in Turkish. His work was translated into English.

In 2018, Musharraf Hussain released The Majestic Quran: A Plain English Translation, a reader-friendly presentation of the translation of the Qur'an aiming to help readers understand the topic being read, and learn the moving and transformative message of the Qur'an. There are 1500 sections with headings. Approved by Dar al-Ifta' al-Misriyya (Egyptian institute of Fatwas).

In 2019, Tahir Mahmood Kiani released The Easy Quran. The translation was intended for readers at age 12, but was also comprehensible to readers as young as 6.

In 2021, Talal Itani released Quran in English: Super-easy to read. For ages 9 to 99. A Quran translation for children and adults.

In 2022, Nuh Ha Mim Keller released The Quran Beheld. Based on two integral study readings over fifteen years with a teacher, it was described by a reviewer as "the first reliable plenary translation of the Quran into English."

In 2023, a new translation of the Quran was produced through a collaboration between Talal Itani and artificial intelligence. This translation is noted for its attempt to balance readability with linguistic precision. It aims to be accessible to a wide range of readers, including children and adults, as well as both Muslims and non-Muslims. The translation strives for a non-sectarian approach and emphasizes grammatical accuracy. The collaboration between Itani, a scholar in Quranic studies, and machine learning algorithms represents an innovative approach in the field of Quran translations.

In October 2023, a new translation of the Quran by Zafarul-Islam Khan was released. According to the New Delhi based Institute of Islamic & Arab Studies, "this is a highly simple and clear English translation of the Muslim holy book. Only the most authentic Arabic sources have been used in its preparation, and best efforts has been made to present the Quran and Islam exactly as they were understood by the early Muslim scholars and commentators of the Holy Quran."

==== French ====
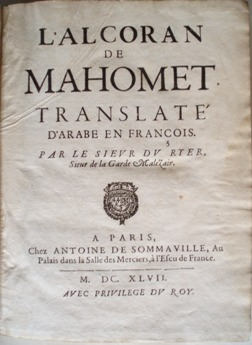
L'Alcoran de Mahomet by André du Ryer, 1647.

L'Alcoran de Mahomet / translaté d'Arabe François par le Sieur Du Ryer, Sieur de la Garde Malezair., 1647, 1649, 1672, 1683, 1719, 1734, 1770, 1775, by André Du Ryer, was the first French translation. This was followed two centuries later in Paris by the 1840 translation by Kasimirski who was an interpreter for the French Persian legation. Then in the mid-twentieth century, a new translation was done by Régis Blachère a French Orientalist followed a few years later in 1959 by the first translation by a Muslim into the French Language from the original Arabic. This work of Muhammad Hamidullah continues to be reprinted and published in Paris and Lebanon as it is regarded as the most linguistically accurate of all translations although critics may complain there is some loss of the spirit of the Arabic original.

==== Modern Greek ====
The first Modern Greek translation was done by Gerasimos I. Pentakis in 1886, after receiving royal approval from George I of Greece. A second edition was published in 1928. Another three were published in 1958, 1980 and 2002, the most recent was done from Persa Koumoutsi. There is also an online translation. In Greek, there is also the 9th century translation of Nicetas Byzantios referred earlier in the article.

==== Russian ====
In 1716, Pyotr Postinkov published the first translation of the Quran in Russian based on the French translation of André du Ryer. Gordiy Sablukov published the first Russian translation of the Quran from the original Arabic text in 1873. Nearly 20 translations in Russian have been published.

==== Spanish ====
There are four complete translations of the Qur'an in modern Spanish that are commonly available.

- Julio Cortes translation 'El Coran' is widely available in North America, being published by New York-based Tahrike Tarsile Qur'an publishing house.
- Ahmed Abboud and Rafael Castellanos, two converts to Islam of Argentine origin, published 'El Sagrado Coran' (El Nilo, Buenos Aires, Argentina, 1953).
- Kamel Mustafa Hallak fine deluxe hardback print 'El Coran Sagrado' is printed by Maryland-based Amana Publications.
- Abdel Ghani Melara Navio a Spaniard who converted to Islam in 1979, his 'Traduccion-Comentario Del Noble Coran' was originally published by Darussalam Publications, Riyadh, in December 1997. The King Fahd Printing Complex has its own version of this translation, with editing by Omar Kaddoura and Isa Amer Quevedo.

=== Asian languages ===
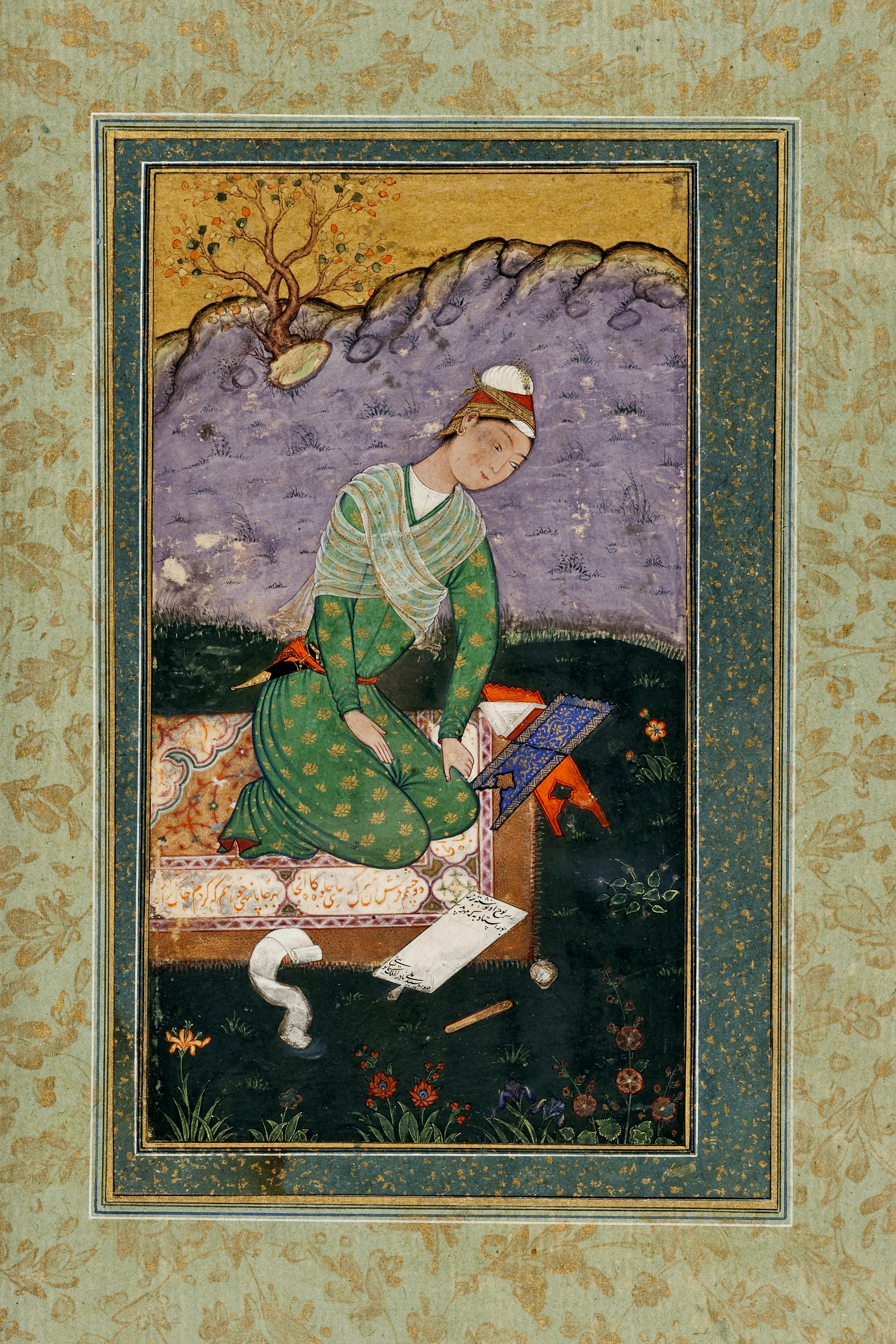
Mir Sayyid Ali, writing a tafsir on the Qur'an during the reign of the Mughal Emperor Shah Jahan.

==== Bengali ====
In 1389, Shah Muhammad Sagir, one of the oldest poets of Bengali literature, was the first to translate surahs of the Qur'an into the old Bengali language. Girish Chandra Sen, a Brahmo Samaj missionary, was the first person to produce a complete translation of the Qur'an into the Bengali language in 1886, although an incomplete translation was made by Amiruddin Basunia in 1808. Abbas Ali of Chandipur, West Bengal was the first Muslim to translate the entire Qur'an into the Bengali language. Muhammad Naimuddin of Tangail translated the first ten chapters of the Qur'an into Bengali in 1891.

Besides many translated Qur'anic exegesis are available in Bengali language. Mohammad Akram Khan translated the 30th chapter of the Quran with commentary in 1926. In 1938, Muhammad Naqibullah Khan published a Bengali translation. Muhiuddin Khan was also a known Bangladeshi who translated the Ma'arif al-Qur'an into Bengali.

Shohoj Bangla Quran (সহজ বাংলা কুরআন) by Engineer Lt Colonel M Alauddin, a translation of Quran in simple Bengali, published from Mowla Brothers, Dhaka, has recorded unprecedented circulation and popularity. It was first published in October 2023. In just one year its 16th print was published.

==== Chinese ====
It is claimed that Yusuf Ma Dexin (1794–1874) is the first translator of the Qur'an into Chinese. However, the first complete translations into Chinese did not appear until 1927, although Islam had been present in China since the Tang dynasty (618–907). Wang Jingzhai was one of the first Chinese Muslims to translate the Qur'an. His translation, the Gǔlánjīng yìjiě, appeared in either 1927 or 1932, with new revised versions being issued in 1943 and 1946. The translation by Lǐ Tiězhēng, a non-Muslim, was not from the original Arabic, but from John Medows Rodwell's English via Sakamoto Ken-ichi's Japanese. A second non-Muslim translation appeared in 1931, edited by Jī Juémí. Other translations appeared in 1943, by Liú Jǐnbiāo, and 1947, by Yáng Zhòngmíng. The most popular version today is the Gǔlánjīng, translated by Mǎ Jiān, parts of which appeared between 1949 and 1951, with the full edition being published posthumously only in 1981.

Tóng Dàozhāng, a Muslim Chinese American, produced a modern translation, entitled Gǔlánjīng, in 1989. The most recent translation appeared in Taipei in 1996, the Qīngzhēn xīliú – Gǔlánjīng xīnyì, translated by Shěn Xiázhǔn, but it has not found favor with Muslims.

The latest translation 古兰经暨 中文译注 was translated and published by Yunus Chiao Shien Ma in 2016 in Taipei ISBN 978-957-43-3984-6.

==== Gujarati ====
Imam Ahmed Raza Khan translated the first Gujarati Quran in 1911 called Kanzul Iman based on the Urdu Translation of Shah Abdul Qadir Dehlvi. Quran Majeed Gujarati Tarjuma Sathe by Ahmedbhai Sulaiman Jumani in 1930.

==== Hebrew ====
The translation of the Qur'an to Hebrew by Oz Yona and his staff was published by Goodword books in 2019.

==== Urdu ====
The first Modern Urdu translation Mouzeh i Quran was done by Shah Abdul Qadir, son of Shah Waliullah, in 1826. A translation of Quran in both Hindi and Urdu was done by Imam Ahmed Raza Khan in 1911 named as Kanzul Iman. One of the authentic translations of the Qur'an in Urdu was done by Abul A'la Maududi and was named Tafhimu'l-Qur'an. Molana Ashiq Elahi Merathi also translated the Qur'an in Urdu. Tafseer e Merathi is a renowned translation of Qur'an along with tarsier and Shan e Nazool in Urdu by Ashiq Ilahi Bulandshahri, In 1961 Mafhoom-ul-Quran was written by Ghulam Ahmed Perwez. In 1985, Maulana Wahiduddin Khan wrote the Urdu Translation and Commentary titled Tazkirul Quran. He also translated Quran in Hindi. Arshad Madani & Pro Sulaiman translated Hindi Quran titled, Quran Sharif: Anuvad aur Vakhya in 1991. Irfan-ul-Qurʻan is an Urdu translation by Muhammad Tahir-ul-Qadri.

==== Indonesian languages ====
The Qur'an has also been translated to Acehnese, Buginese, Gorontalo, Javanese, Sundanese, and Indonesian of Indonesia, the most populous Muslim country in the world. Translation into Acehnese was done by Mahijiddin Yusuf in 1995; into Buginese by Daude Ismaile and Nuh Daeng Manompo in 1982; into Gorontalo by Lukman Katili in 2008; into Javanese by Ngarpah (1913), Kyai Bisyri Mustafa Rembang (1964), and K. H. R. Muhamad Adnan; in Sundanese by A.A. Dallan, H. Qamaruddin Shaleh, Jus Rusamsi in 1965; and in Indonesian at least in three versions: A Dt. Madjoindo, H.M Kasim Bakery, Imam M. Nur Idris, A. Hassan, Mahmud Yunus, H.S. Fachruddin, H., Hamidy (all in the 1960s), Mohammad Diponegoro, Bachtiar Surin (all in the 1970s), and Departemen Agama Republik Indonesia (Indonesian Department of Religious Affair).

==== Japanese ====
The first translation into Japanese was done by Sakamoto Ken-ichi in 1920. Sakamoto worked from Rodwell's English translation. Takahashi Goro, Bunpachiro (Ahmad) Ariga and Mizuho Yamaguchi produced Japan's second translation in 1938. The first translation from the Arabic was done by Toshihiko Izutsu in 1945. In 1950, another translation appeared by Shūmei Ōkawa. Other translations have appeared more recently by Ban Yasunari and Osamu Ikeda in 1970 and by Umar Ryoichi Mita in 1972.

In 2015, a Japanese language manga adaptation of the Qur'an was published in Japan as part of the East Press Manga de Dokuha series, which seeks to adapt historic books into an accessible manga format. This version is framed for Japanese cultural sensibilities around a narrative in which a wise old Muslim man meets a kawaii-coded djinn in a mosque who is drawn to the sound of Qur'an recitation and wishes to learn more about Islam. The two then embark on a journey through time and space as the story of the Qur'an unfolds. Various surahs are included in full throughout. The nameless protagonist, not Muhammad, is the man on the book's cover. Muhammad does appear and even speaks to the two main characters, but he is depicted as a cloaked figure without a face.

==== Nuclear Malayo-Polynesian languages ====
William Shellabear (1862–1948) a British scholar and missionary in Malaysia, after translating the Bible into the Malay language began a translation of the Qur'an, but died in 1948 without finishing it.

==== Sindhi ====
Akhund Azaz Allah Muttalawi (Urdu: آخوند أعزاز الله) (Sindhi: مولانا اعزاز اللہ ) was a Muslim theologian from Sindh. He is considered to be the first person who translated the Qur'an from Arabic to Sindhi. According to Sindhi tradition the first translation was made by in 270 AH / 883 CE by an Arab scholar. Later, it was translated into the Sindhi language by Imam Abul Hassan bin Mohammad Sadiq Al-Sindhi Al-Ma.

==== Tagalog ====
In 1982, Abdul Rakman H. Bruce produced a Tagalog translation, Ang Banal na Kuran.

==== Tamil ====
Translated as Fathhur-Rahma Fi Tarjimati Tafsir al-Qur'an (Qur'an translation) by Sheikh Mustafa Waliullah (1836 – 25 July 1888) Beruwala, Sri Lanka; Later on Abdul Hameed Bhakavi Tamil Nadu- India

==== Turkish ====
The earliest Quranic translation in the Turkish or Turkic language dates back to the 11th century. One of his later translation works is the copy written in the Khorezmian Turkic language in 1363, which is registered in Istanbul's Suleymaniye Library, Hekimoğlu Ali Paşa mosque No:2. This translation in Khorezmian Turkic, like other translations of the Qur'an, is important for language studies. Because the sanctity of the text that is subject to translation will cause the translator to behave more carefully, the errors encountered in the text are not included in such works. Besides, attention was paid to the religious terminology to be understood by the public and that is why Turkic words are given weight. G. Sağol worked on the translation in question. Muhammed Hamdi Yazır worked on tafsir (Qur'anic exegesis) in the Maturidi context, and published his Hakk Dīni Kur'an Dili, the first Modern Turkish translation of Quran in 1935 by the orders of Kemal Ataturk.

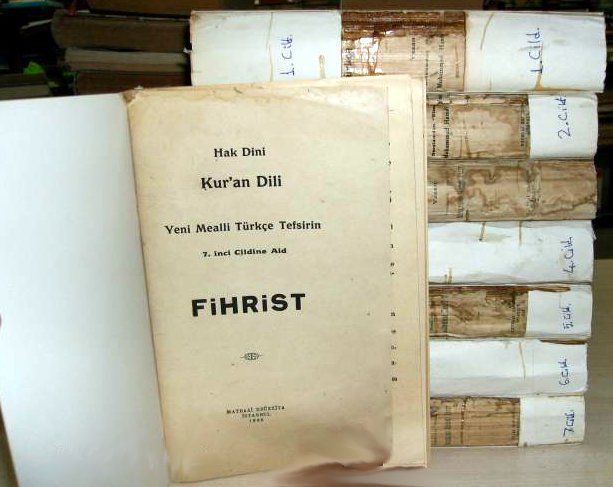
The first edition 1935 prints of Hakk Dīni Kur'an Dili. A tafsir and translation of the Qur'an in the modern Turkish language ordered by Mustafa Kemal Atatürk.

In 1999, the Turkish translation of the Qur'an, MESAJ by Edip Yüksel was published, about seven years after the publication of his book, Türkçe Kuran Çevirilerindeki Hatalar ("Errors in Turkish Translations of the Qur'an"). The translation is a Quranist translation, similar to the translation by Yaşar Nuri Öztürk, and does not consider hadith and sectarian traditional jurisprudence as an authority in understanding the Qur'an. It differs greatly from Sunni and Shia traditions in the translation of numerous crucial words and verses.

Hakkı Yılmaz worked on the Qur'an through the root meanings of the Arabic words and published a study called Tebyin-ül Qur'an. And he also published a Division by Division Interpretation in the Order of Revelation.

=== African languages ===
- Translation of the Qur'an to Oromo by Sheikh Mohammed Rashad Abdulle.
- Translation of the Qur'an to Swahili by Sheikh Ali Muhsin al-Barwani.
- Translation of the Qur'an to Swahili language by Sheikh Said Moosa Mohamed al-Kindy.
- Translation of the Qur'an to Hausa by Sheikh Muhamud Gumi.
- Translation of the Qur'an to Yoruba by Sheikh Adam Abdullah Al-Ilory.
- Translation of the Qur'an to Dagbanli by Sheikh M. Baba Gbetobu.

=== Esperanto ===
After the fall of the Shah, Ayatollah Khomeini of Iran called on Muslims to learn Esperanto. Shortly thereafter, an official Esperanto translation of the Qur'an was produced by the state.

Muztar Abbasi also translated the Qur'an into Esperanto and wrote a biography of Muhammad and several other books in Esperanto and Urdu.

In 1970, Professor Italo Chiussi, an Ahmadi, translated the Qur'an into Esperanto.

== See also ==
- List of translations of the Quran
- History of the Qur'an
- Literary translation
- Tafsir
