= Rank Nazeer Ahmed =

Indian Muslim scholar and politician (1939–present)

Nazeer Ahmed

Member of Karnataka Legislative Assembly
- In office 1978–1979
- Preceded by: Abdul Subhan
- Succeeded by: S.Shafi Ahmed
- Constituency: Tumakuru
- In office 1979–1983

Personal details
- Born: 28 September 1939 (age 86) Tumkur, Mysore State, United India (now in Karnataka, India)
- Party: Indian National Congress

Nazeer Ahmed (also known as Rank Nazeer) is an Indian Muslim scholar, politician, historian and translator and founder-author of the Encyclopedia of Islamic History. He is a former politician of Indian National Congress, a former Member of Legislative Assembly from Karnataka, and Member of Karnataka Knowledge Commission, Government of Karnataka.

== Early life ==
He was born in Tumkur in the state of Mysore, India in 1939 to Abdul Azeem, an Islamic scholar of the Qadiriyya. In 1952, he achieved the first rank in the entire state of Mysore and won the Maharaja of Mysore Gold Medal. He has been known as “Rank Nazeer Ahmed” due to the consistency with which he ranked first in state and interstate exams.

He entered the California Institute of Technology in 1961 as an Institute Scholar as well as a Tata Scholar. He was awarded MS and AeE degrees from Caltech. He worked in Huntsville, Alabama on the Saturn, Apollo and Lunar Land Rover Projects at the Marshall Space Flight Center in 1964–65. He obtained a PhD in Theoretical and Applied Mechanics from Cornell University in 1967. Under Peter Drucker he studied management at New York University. He then obtained an MBA from Rider University, New Jersey.

== Teachers ==
He received his early religious training from Maulvi Abdul Quddus Qudsi, and he continues to be a student of Nazim al-Haqqani.

== Political career ==
In 1977, he was elected a member of the Karnataka Legislative Assembly from the 57th constituency but resigned a year later. In 1988 he was elected a delegate to the Democratic National Convention, 42nd Congressional District in California. In 1992 he was a candidate for US Congress, 46 CA Congressional District.

== Charity work ==
The charities he founded in Tumkur, India, have given out millions in scholarships to poor children of all faiths and has built schools, mosques, and a unique Idgah with spiritual themes.

== Books ==
Among his books are the following:

- Islam in Global History, in two volumes was published in the United States and translated into Urdu and Persian.
- The Qur'an: An English Translation, was done over a period of three years, between 2007 and 2010, although some of this work was done as early as 1972.

== See also ==
- Musharraf Hussain
- Nurettin Uzunoğlu
- Ahmed Hulusi
- Ali Ünal
