= Al-Ghayb =

Arabic expression

Al-Ghayb (Arabic: الغيب) is an Arabic expression used to convey that something is concealed (unseen). In Islam, it is a technical term referring to the secrets only known by God. It is an important concept in Islam, encompassing what cannot be perceived or known by humans. This includes God, the attributes of God, the Last Day and its events, and the heart (qalb). Beyond the theological implications, it can also mean something "unseen" relative to an observer, in the sense that someone acts behind the perceiver's back.

In general, creatures classified as supernatural in Western scholarship, such as Jinn, are not considered to be part of al-Ghayb. Since „supernatural beings“, though unseen relative to humans, belong to the category of created beings and not to God‘s secrets. Jinn do not know God’s secrets and rely on prophets for revelation. Angels likewise have only limited knowledge and know „only what God taught“ them.

In the Quran, it has 6 forms and 3 meanings. But it can also be used in a general sense to refer to something that is known to some but concealed from others.

== Meaning ==
In Arabic, al- Ghayb refers to anything that is hidden in some manner. The term is composed of two words (a definitive article and an adjective), "al" and " Ghayb", literally translating to "the" and "unseen" respectively. It possesses multiple intricate meanings stemming out from the figurative translation "the depth of the well." Given that the bottom of the well is visually concealed as a result of its depth, its contents are generally undeterminable. Al- Ghayb therefore refers to that which is absent, hidden, or concealed. Like majority of adjectives in the Arabic language, al- Ghayb has a triliteral or triconsonantal root. It is composed of three root letters غ ي ب (gaain, yaa, baa), roughly tantamount to gh-y-b respectively in the English language.

== In Islam ==
In the Islamic context, al- Ghayb refers to transcendental or divine secrets. It is mentioned in sixty different places in the Qur'an, in six different forms. It has three primary meanings:

1. Absent – "That is so al-'Azeez will know that I did not betray him in [his] absence and that Allah does not guide the plan of betrayers." (12:52)
2. The unknown or hidden – "[Allah is] Knower of the unseen and the witnessed, the Grand, the Exalted." (13:9)
3. The future – "Say, "I hold not for myself [the power of] benefit or harm, except what Allah has willed. And if I knew the unseen, I could have acquired much wealth, and no harm would have touched me. I am not except a warner and a bringer of good tidings to a people who believe." " (7:188)

=== Types ===
There are two types of Ghayb:

1. Al- Ghayb al-Mutlaq (Arabic: الغيب المطلق) - Absolute Ghayb refers to all knowledge that is unseen or concealed and is only known to Allah. As stated in the Quran: "And with Him are the keys of the Ghayb (all that is hidden), none knows them but He…" (6:59)

Examples of this form of Ghayb are illustrated in the narrations of Muhammad: It is narrated that Abdullah bin `Umar said that the Messenger of Allah said, "The Keys of the Ghayb (unseen knowledge) are five, nobody knows them but Allah. Nobody knows what will happen tomorrow except Allah; nobody knows what is in the womb except Allah; nobody knows when it will rain except Allah; no soul knows at what place he will die except Allah; and nobody knows when the (Final) Hour will begin except Allah.)

2. Al- Ghayb al-Nisbi (Arabic: الغيب النسبي) - Relative Ghayb is proportionate to an individual and their situation; hence it is apparent to some while hidden from others. An example to illustrate this notion is that of a class in which the students can see the lecturer, hear the content of the lecture, and the conversations that take place in the classroom, while those outside are unaware of the occurrences in the classroom.

== Examples in Islamic texts ==
In Islamic context, (al-) Ghayb is (the) unseen and unknown, in reference to God (Allah) and the forces that shape the world. The Quran states that man (mankind) is unable to see God and his attributes. Belief in al- Ghayb is considered an important Muslim characteristic, as it allows for prayer and faith.

…قَالَ أَلَمْ أَقُل لَّكُمْ إِنِّي أَعْلَمُ غَيْبَ السَّمَاوَاتِ وَالْأَرْضِ وَأَعْلَمُ مَا تُبْدُونَ وَمَا كُنتُمْ تَكْتُمُونَ

— Quran 2:33
Translation:

Allah said, “O Adam! Inform them of their names.” Then when Adam did, Allah said, “Did I not tell you that I know the secrets of the heavens and the earth, and I know what you reveal and what you conceal?”

— Sahih International English translation

قُل لَّا أَقُولُ لَكُمْ عِندِي خَزَائِنُ اللَّهِ وَلَا أَعْلَمُ الْغَيْبَ وَلَا أَقُولُ لَكُمْ إِنِّي مَلَكٌ ۖ إِنْ أَتَّبِعُ إِلَّا مَا يُوحَى إِلَيَّ

— Quran 6:50
Translation:

Say, ˹O Prophet,˺ “I do not say to you that I possess Allah’s treasuries or know the unseen, nor do I claim to be an angel. I only follow what is revealed to me.” Say, “Are those blind ˹to the truth˺ equal to those who can see?"

— Sahih International English translation

وَعِندَهُ مَفَاتِحُ الْغَيْبِ لَا يَعْلَمُهَا إِلَّا هُوَ ۚ وَيَعْلَمُ مَا فِي الْبَرِّ وَالْبَحْرِ ۚ وَمَا تَسْقُطُ مِن وَرَقَةٍ إِلَّا يَعْلَمُهَا وَلَا حَبَّةٍ فِي ظُلُمَاتِ الْأَرْضِ وَلَا رَطْبٍ وَلَا يَابِسٍ إِلَّا فِي كِتَابٍ مُّبِينٍ

— Quran 6:59
Translation:

With Him are the keys of the unseen—no one knows them except Him.1 And He knows what is in the land and sea. Not even a leaf falls without His knowledge, nor a grain in the darkness of the earth or anything—green or dry—but is ˹written˺ in a perfect Record.

— Sahih International English translation
