= Du Ryer =

Du Ryer is a French family. Notable people of this name are:

- André du Ryer, a French orientalist
- Pierre du Ryer, a French playwright
