= Clifford Edmund Bosworth =

British historian and orientalist (1928–2015)

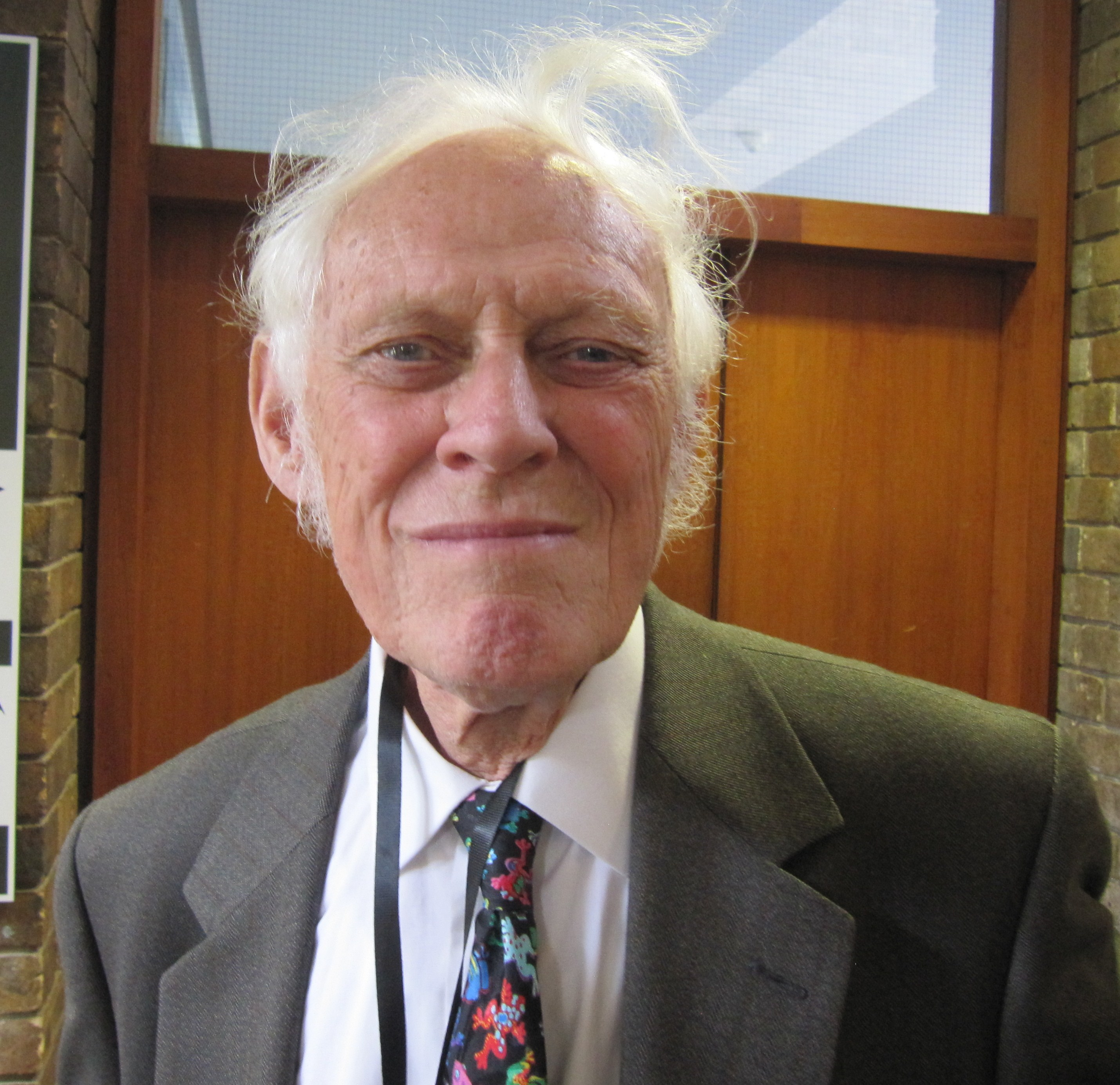
- Bosworth in 2011
- Born: 29 December 1928; Sheffield, Yorkshire, England
- Died: 28 February 2015 (aged 86); Yeovil, Somerset, England

Academic background
- Academic advisor: Vladimir Minorsky

Academic work
- Institutions: University of Oxford
- Main interests: Iranian studies, Islamic studies, Arabic studies, Turkish studies

Clifford Edmund Bosworth FBA (29 December 1928 – 28 February 2015) was an English historian and Orientalist, specialising in Arabic and Iranian studies.

== Life ==
Bosworth was born on 29 December 1928 in Sheffield, West Riding of Yorkshire (now South Yorkshire). His father, Clifford Bosworth, clerked for Board of Guardians before working for Ministry of Pensions and National Insurance. His mother was Gladys Constance Gregory. He received his Bachelor of Arts degree in modern history from St John's College, Oxford, before achieving an MA in Middle Eastern studies and PhD degrees from the University of Edinburgh.

Before attending the University of Edinburgh, he worked for the Department of Agriculture for Scotland. There he met Annette Ellen Todd, and they were married in Edinburgh on 19 September 1957. The couple went on to have three daughters.

He held permanent posts at the University of St Andrews, the University of Manchester and the Center for the Humanities at Princeton University. He was visiting professor at the University of Exeter, where he held the post from 2004. Bosworth died on 28 February 2015 in Yeovil, Somerset.

== Works ==
Bosworth was the author of hundreds of articles in academic journals and composite volumes. His other contributions included nearly 200 articles in the Encyclopaedia of Islam and some 100 articles in the Encyclopædia Iranica, as well as articles for Encyclopædia Britannica and Encyclopedia Americana. He was the chief editor of the Encyclopaedia of Islam and a consulting editor of Encyclopædia Iranica.

== Bibliography ==
- The Ghaznavids, their empire in Afghanistan and Eastern Iran 994–1040, Edinburgh University Press 1963, 2nd ed. Beirut 1973, repr. New Delhi 1992 (Persian tr.).
- The Islamic dynasties, a chronological and genealogical handbook, Edinburgh University Press 1967, revised ed. 1980 (Russian, Persian, Turkish, Arabic and French trs.).
- Sistan under the Arabs, from the Islamic conquest to the rise of the Saffarids (30-250/651-864), IsMEO, Rome 1968 (Persian tr.).
- The Book of curious and entertaining information, the Lata'if al-ma'arif of Tha'ālibī translated into English, Edinburgh University Press 1968.
- (Editor) Iran and Islam, in memory of the late Vladimir Minorsky, Edinburgh University Press 1971.
- (Editor, with Joseph Schacht) The legacy of Islam, new edition, Clarendon Press, Oxford 1974 (Arabic tr. Kuwait, 1998).
- The mediaeval Islamic underworld, the Banu Sasan in Arabic society and literature, 2 vols., Brill, Leiden 1976.
- The medieval history of Iran, Afghanistan and Central Asia, Variorum, Collected Studies Series, London 1977.
- The later Ghaznavids, splendour and decay: the dynasty in Afghanistan and northern India 1040–1186, Edinburgh University Press 1977, repr. New Delhi 1992 (Persian tr.)
- Al-Maqrizi's "Book of contention and strife concerning the relations between the Banu Umayya and the Banu Hashim" translated into English, Journal of Semitic Studies Monographs, 3, Manchester 1981.
- Medieval Arabic culture and administration, Variorum, Collected Studies Series, London 1982.
- (Editor, with Carole Hillenbrand) Qajar Iran, political, social and cultural change 1800–1925 [= Festschrift for L.P. Elwell-Sutton], Edinburgh University Press 1984.
- The History of al-Tabari. Vol. XXXII. The reunification of the Abbasid Caliphate. The caliphate of al-Ma'mun A.D. 812-833/A.H. 198–213, translated and annotated by C.E. Bosworth, SUNY Press, Albany 1987.
- The History of al-Tabari. Vol. XXX. The Abbasid Caliphate in equilibrium. The caliphates of Musa al-Hadi and Harun al-Rashid A.D. 785-809/A.H. 169–193, translated and annotated by C.E.Bosworth, SUNY Press, Albany 1989.
- Baha' al-Din al-Amili and his literary anthologies, Journal of Semitic Studies Monographs 10, Manchester 1989.
- The History of al-Tabari. Vol. XXXIII. Storm and stress along the northern frontiers of the Abbasid Caliphate. The caliphate of al-Mu'tas'im A.D. 833-842/A.H. 218–227, translated and annotated by C.E. Bosworth, SUNY Press, Albany 1991.(editor, with M.E.J. Richardson) Richard Bell, A commentary on the Qur'an, University of Manchester (Journal of Semitic Studies) 1991, 2 vols.
- The History of the Saffarids of Sistan and the Maliks of Nimruz (247/861 to 949/1452-3), Columbia Lectures on Iranian Studies no. 7, Costa Mesa, Calif. and New York 1994.
- The Arabs, Byzantium and Iran. Studies in early Islamic history and culture, Variorum, Collected Studies Series, Ashgate Publishing, Aldershot 1996.
- The New Islamic dynasties. A chronological and genealogical manual, Edinburgh University Press 1996.
- (Editor, with Muhammad Asim, and contributor) The UNESCO history of civilizations of Central Asia, Vol. IV, The age of achievement. A.D. 750 to the end of the fifteenth century. Part 1, The historical, social and economic setting, Paris 1998. Part 2, The literary, cultural, artistic and scientific achievements, Paris 2000.
- The History of al-Tabari. Vol. V. The Sasanids, the Byzantines, the Lakhmids and Yemen, translated and annotated by C.E. Bosworth, SUNY Press, Albany 1999 (editor, and contributor of four chapters)
- A century of British orientalists 1902–2001 [= Centennial Volume of the Oriental and African Studies Section of the British Academy], Oxford University Press for the British Academy 2001.
- Abu 'l-Fadl Bayhaqi's Tarkh-i Mas'udi translated into English with a historical, geographical and linguistic commentary, to appear in the Persian Heritage Series, Columbia University, 3 volumes, New York, 2006; An intrepid Scot: William Lithgow of Lanark's travels in the Ottoman Empire and Mediterranean lands 1609–21, Aldershot 2006.

== Awards ==
- UNESCO Avicenna Silver Medal, 1998
- Dr Mahmud Afshar Foundation Prize for contributions to Iranian Studies, 2001
- Prize by the Ministry of Culture and Islamic Guidance, Tehran, for contributions to Iranian historical studies, 2003
- Triennial Award, 2003
