= Musharraf Hussain =

British-Pakistani scholar

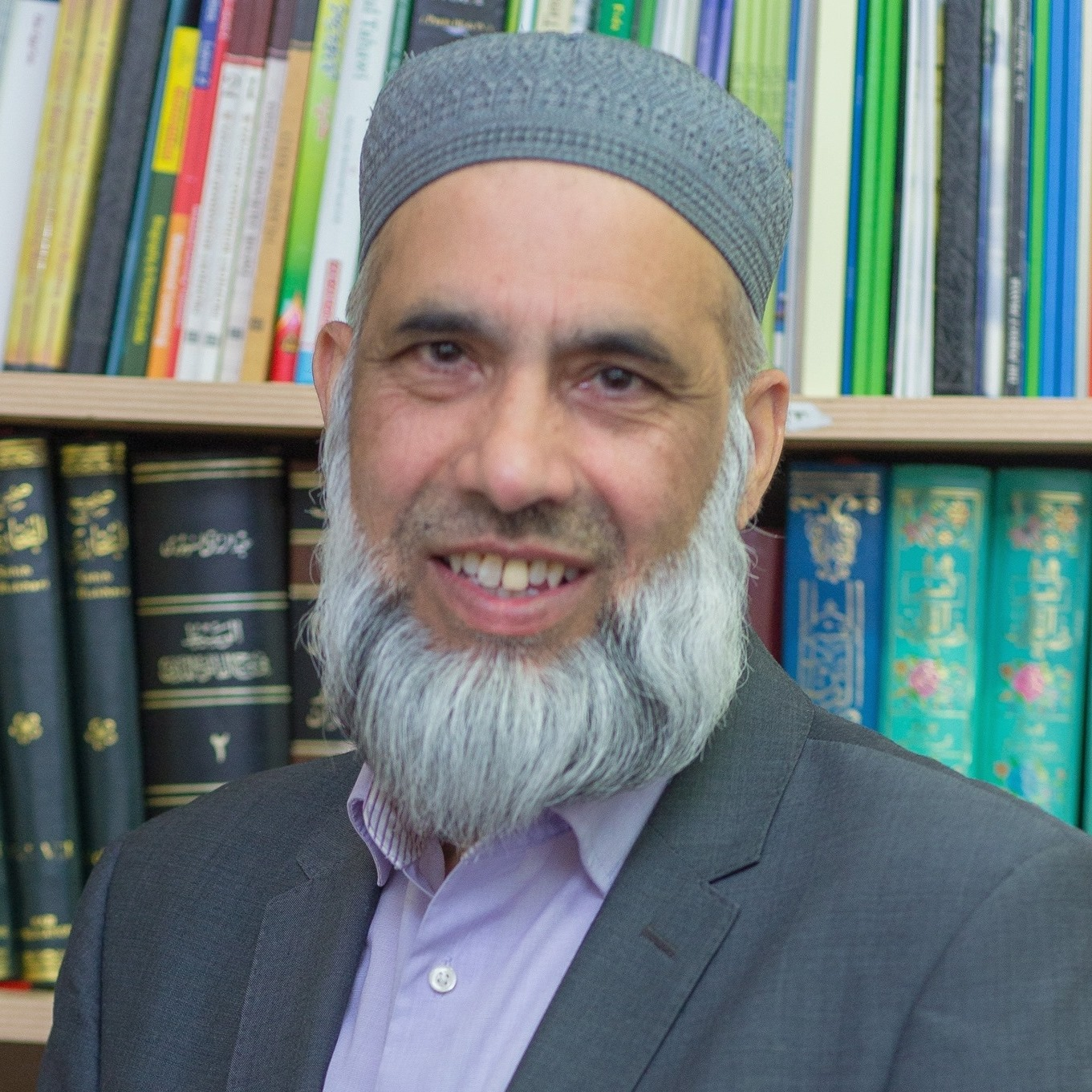
- Hussain in September 2021

Personal life
- Born: Pakistan
- Citizenship: Britain
- Education: Aston University (BSc & PhD in Biochemistry); Darul Uloom Muhammadia Ghausia (Ijaza in Hadith); Al-Azhar University (BA in Usul al-Din)
- Known for: Religious scholar, writer, Quran translator
- Occupation: Islamic scholar
- Website: musharrafhussain.com

Religious life
- Religion: Islam
- Denomination: Sunni
- Jurisprudence: Hanafi
- Creed: Maturidi

Musharraf Hussain OBE DL is a British-Pakistani Islamic scholar, biochemist and educator in Nottinghamshire, United Kingdom.

== Biography ==
Born in Pakistan in 1958, he relocated to Halifax, West Yorkshire, with his family in 1966. During his youth, he memorized the Quran and acquired foundational knowledge in Arabic and Tajwid. He initially pursued a career in the sciences, earning a bachelor's degree in biochemistry from Aston University before completing a science doctorate. He trained and worked as a research scientist before becoming a full-time imam and an Islamic teacher: he worked as a scientist until 1990, at which point he shifted his focus toward religious service. To formalize his theological training, he studied at a seminary in Pakistan under Justice Pir Muhammad Karam Shah, followed by further Islamic studies at Al-Azhar University in Egypt.

In 1995, he co-founded Jamia Al Karam, an Islamic boarding school located in Retford, where he served as headteacher for three years. Throughout his career in education, he has also served as the director of a Postgraduate Certificate in Education (PGCE) program and as vice-chair of the Association of Muslim Schools.

Musharraf Hussain is the Chief Executive of the Karimia institute Nottingham, an author and the Chief Editor of The Invitation, a Muslim family magazine. Musharraf is also a senior trustee of Muslim Hands, an international charity working in over 50 countries.

From 2000 to 2003, he was the vice-chairman of the Association of Muslim schools. In September 2004, he and Daud Abdullah flew to Iraq, where they appealed to the captors to release British hostage Ken Bigley. In 2005, Hussain received an honorary degree from Staffordshire University.

In 2006, the British Prime Minister appointed him to chair the UK–Indonesian Islamic Advisory Group. The group was tasked with advising the government on countering extremism and fostering better mutual understanding between Islam and the Wests. Additionally, he has held leadership and board positions across several organizations, including serving as chair of the Christian Muslim Forum, a senior trustee of the international charity Muslim Hands, and a trustee of the National Centre for Citizenship and Law.

Motivated by a desire to make Islamic texts more accessible to English-speaking Muslims, Hussain began working on a plain English translation of the Quran in 2014. After consulting with a panel of Islamic scholars to complete the project, he published the work under the title The Majestic Quran. On March 25, 2017, the translation was officially certified by Dr. Ibrahim Negm, the Senior Advisor to the Grand Mufti of Egypt. In 2019, he was awarded the 'Iman wa Amal' Special Award by The Muslim News for his translation of the Quran.

== Books ==
Year	Title	Publisher	ISBN
2009	Seven Steps to Moral Intelligence	Kube Publishing	ISBN 9781847740090
2012	Five Pillars: Laying the Foundations of Divine Love and Service to Humanity	Kube Publishing	ISBN 9781847740236
2014	Seven Steps to Spiritual Intelligence	Kube Publishing	ISBN 9781847740786
2018	The Majestic Quran: A plain English translation	Invitation Publishing	ISBN 9781902248660

== See also ==
- Rank Nazeer Ahmed
- Ali Ünal
- Ahmed Hulusi
- Nurettin Uzunoğlu
