= Akhund Azizullah Muttalawi =

Islamic scholar

Akhund Azizullah Muttalawi (Sindhi: آخوند عزيز الله متعلوي) was a Muslim theologian from Sindh, in what is now Pakistan. Despite the Holy Quran first being translated into Sindhi in 884 CE, Azizullah is considered to be the first to formally publish his translation of the Quran from Arabic into Sindhi in 1870.

== See also ==
- List of translations of the Quran
