= Sahih International =

English translation of the Quran

Saheeh International translation
- Author: Umm Muhammad (Emily Assami); Mary Kennedy; Amatullah Bantley
- Language: English
- Subject: Islam
- Genre: Religious
- Publisher: Abul-Qasim Publishing House
- Publication date: 1997

The Sahih International translation is an English-language translation of the Quran. Published by the Publishing House Dar Abul Qasim in Saudi Arabia, it is one of the world's most popular Quran translations.

Translated by three American women, Umm Muhammad (Emily Assami), Mary Kennedy, and Amatullah Bantley, it uses un-archaic language. Notable conventions include rendering the God in Islam as Allah as they believe it is not acceptable to use the English word.

The translation has been described as biased towards "Sunni orthodoxy," which, according to authors, requires words to be inserted in square parentheses. It has been sponsored and promoted by Salafi followers. For those reasons, it has been defined as an ultraconservative translation.

Ṣaḥīḥ (صحيح) may be translated as "authentic" or "sound."

== Translators ==
Emily Assami was born in California into an atheist family. She studied Arabic at Damascus University. She converted to Islam and is known as Umm Muhammad or Aminah.

Mary Kennedy was born in Orlando. She was a former Christian who converted to Islam.

Amatullah Bantley was a former Catholic Christian. She was introduced to Islam through international Muslim students. She converted to Islam in 1986 and eventually moved to Saudi Arabia.

== See also ==
- The Qur'an with Annotated Interpretation in Modern English
- English translations of the Quran
