= John Medows Rodwell =

British Islamic scholar (1808–1900)

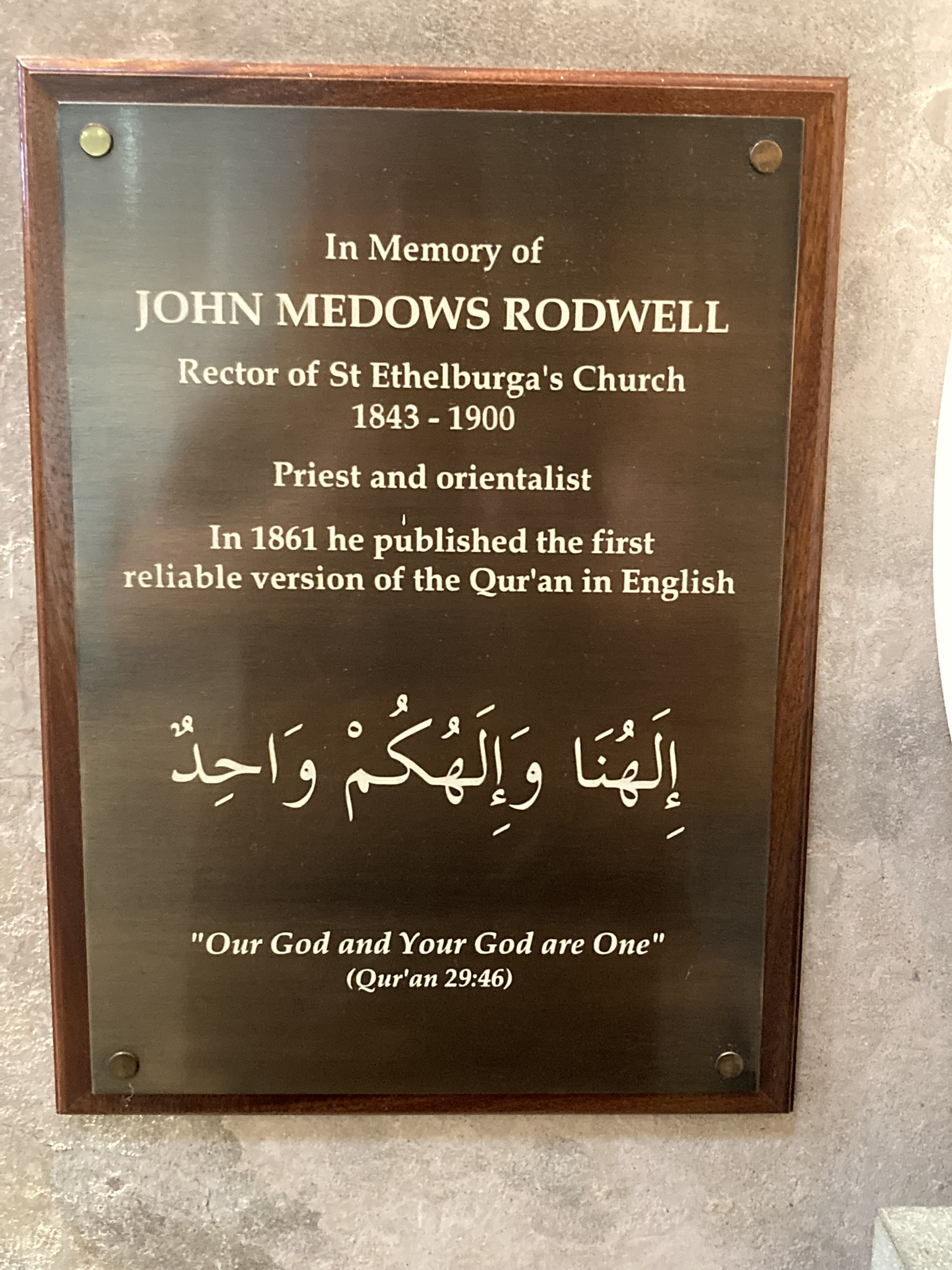
A memorial plaque dedicated to Rodwell at St Ethelburga's Bishopsgate

John Medows Rodwell (1808–1900) was an English clergyman of the Church of England and an Islamic studies scholar, who translated the Qur'an into English.

Rodwell was a friend of Charles Darwin while both were studying at Cambridge, and he maintained a correspondence with Darwin after their graduation. He served as Rector of St.Peter's, Saffron Hill, London 1836–43 and Rector of St Ethelburga's, Bishopsgate, London from 1843 to 1900.

== Qur'an translation ==
Rodwell's Qur'an translation The Koran was first published in 1861. In the 1994 Everyman's Library edition the Surahs, which Rodwell originally ordered chronologically, have been put back in the traditional order, from long to short. Rodwell's outdated preface and professor G. Margoliouth's introductory notes have been replaced by a new introduction by Alan Jones, and some of Rodwell's obsolete notes have been removed as well. According to Jones, when comparing with the Qur'an translations of Sale (1734), Palmer (1880), Pickthall (1930), Bell (1937-9) and Arberry (1955), the strengths of Rodwell's translation lies in its "nineteenth century positivistic approach" and his much better cross-referencing to biblical texts, which is "crucial to one's understanding of the Qur'an".
