= The Majestic Quran: An English Rendition of Its Meanings =

English translation of the meanings of Qur'an

The Majestic Qur'an: An English Rendition of Its Meanings
- Editors: Abdal Hakim Murad, Mostafa Badawi, Uthman Hutchinson
- Authors: Ali Özek, Nureddin Uzunoğlu, Tevfik Rüştü Topuzoğlu, Mehmet Maksudoğlu
- Original title: The Holy Qur'an with English Translation
- Illustrator: Abd al-Lateef Whiteman
- Language: English
- Subject: Qur'an translation, Tafsir (Qur'anic exegesis)
- Publisher: Starlatch Press, USA
- Publication date: 2000
- ISBN: 978-1-929694-50-1

The Majestic Qur'an: An English Rendition of Its Meanings is a 20th century English translation of the meanings of Qur'an authored by four Turkish Sunni scholars. The translation is written in modern English, and contains more than 800 explanatory notes, makes the Scripture easier to understand. Although this translation describes itself as a committee work, the authors each had their focus. Nureddin Uzunoğlu (Note: Nureddin Uzunoğlu has his own translation of the Qur'an, entitled: "The Holy Qur'an with Translation and Commentaries".) translated surahs (chapters) 1 to 8; Tevfik Rüştü Topuzoğlu: 9 to 20; Ali Özek: 21 to 39; Mehmet Maksutoğlu: 40 to 114.

== About the authors ==
A translation committee of four scholars and three editors worked on this translation, including the following:

- Prof. Dr. Ali Özek, teaching the interpretation of the Qur'an at the Faculty of Theology in Marmara University, Istanbul, Turkey.
- Prof. Dr. Nureddin Uzunoğlu, professor and author of International Law and Islamic Studies in Nebraska, United States. He played a broad role in the second revision of the translation.
- Dr. Tevfik Rüştü Topuzoğlu, teaching Arabic at the Faculty of Arts in Istanbul University, also working as a writer and editor of Arabic Language and Literature in the Turkish Religious Foundation's Encyclopedia of Islam (Türkiye Diyanet Vakfı İslam Ansiklopedisi).
- Prof. Dr. Mehmet Maksutoğlu, teaching Islamic History at the Faculty of Theology in Marmara University, Istanbul, Turkey.

== Editions ==
The work namely "The Holy Qur'an with English Translation" was first published in 1992 in Istanbul. It was published more than ten times by different publishers under different names.

In 2000, a fourth edition was generated and edited by a committee that included Cambridge professor Timothy Winter (Abdal Hakim Murad), the American Muslim writer Uthman Hutchinson, and Mostafa al-Badawi. Supported by the Nawawi Foundation, and published by Starlatch Press, as a bilingual edition. The work titled "The Majestic Quran: An English Rendition of Its Meanings". This fourth edition dropped some spare amplifying words, enriched its English vocabulary, regulated word selection, and augmented it with contemporary terms (i.e. Muslim rather than “those who have surrendered”). Commentary has been moved from between verses to the bottom of the page.

In 2018, the book was re-published in Turkey by Server Yayınları, under the title of "The Glorious Qur'an (English Translation and Commentary)".

== Purpose ==
Bilâl Başar developed a project to send the English translation of the Quran first to the African nations and to all regions in need around the world. In this regard, Ali Özek, Nurettin Uzunoğlu, Tevfik Rüştü Topuzoğlu, Mehmet Maksudoğlu provided translations applicable to their sections of The Qur'an. Their aim in preparing this English translation with explanations was to assist the readers to understand the meaning of God's divine message as revealed in the Qur'an. In addition to using everyday English whenever possible, some explanations and brief commentaries were added in parentheses among the verses so that the connections between the verses are more apparent and the verses can be read more smoothly.

== Quotations ==
The Quran, chapter 52 (At-Tur), verses 33–35:

33. Do they say: “He has invented it?” No, they have no faith. 34. Let them produce a speech like it, if what they say be true! 35. Or were they created out of nothing? Or were they the creators?

== See also ==
- The Qur'an with Annotated Interpretation in Modern English
- English translations of the Quran
