= Mirza Abul Fazl =

Translator of the Quran (1865–1956)

Abul Fazl

Personal life
- Born: 1865 CE Bengal Presidency
- Died: May 1956 (aged 90–91) India
- Other name: Abu al-Fadl

Religious life
- Religion: Islam
- Denomination: Shia

Muslim leader
- Based in: Allahabad
- Students: Hashim Amir Ali

Mirza Abul Fazl (1865–1956) was a 20th-century homeopathist in Allahabad, best known for his English translation of the Qur'an.

== Early life and education ==
Abul Fazl was born in 1865 to a Bengali Shi'ite family of Mirzas in eastern Bengal (now Bangladesh) whose ancestors had migrated from Shiraz, Persia. His lineage is as follows: Mirza Abul Fazl, son of Fayyaz Ali, son of Nauroz Ali, son of Haji Ali Shirazi.

His early education was completed in Bengal. On the basis of distinctions received during the course of his education, he secured a scholarship to study in Berlin, Germany in c. 1893 where he completed his MA and PhD degrees in Sanskrit. While he was in Germany he developed an interest in homeopathy, as this system of treatment was very popular in Germany in those days and obtained highest qualifications from Germany and the United States of America gaining extraordinary expertise in that field.

== Career ==
In his late thirties that Mirza Abul Fazl started to study the Qur'an. As in the case of studying other sacred scriptures he tried to delve deep into the true spirit of the Qur'an directly from original text. He was a profound scholar of Sanskrit and Arabic.

He returned to India after spending many years abroad with the resolve to participate in the freedom struggle. He stuck to his decision until his last. He maintained his link with the Indian National Congress in some capacity or the other. He stayed in Calcutta, western Bengal for some but then moved to Allahabad. Jawaharlal Nehru's family was not only known to him, he was a regular visitor to Anand Bhavan. When Jawaharlal Nehru was elected as chairman of Allahabad Municipality, he offered Mirza Abul Fazl a position in the municipality. He was there in 1929. He had friendship with Pandit Sunderlal and Rajendra Prasad also. It is but easy to visualise his possible influence on the freedom movement in some way or the other.

He visited Hyderabad in 1937 on the invitation of Jameelur Rahman and adopted homeopathy as his profession. His clinic was located opposite Sagar talkies.

He used to hold here meetings, academic discussions and debates with reputed personalities of the time such as Akbar Yar Jung, Khalifa Abdul Hakeem, Abdul Majeed Siddiqui and Professor Jameelur Rahman. He would be in touch with members of both high and middle class society, in connection with treatment and remedy of ailments. Hashim Amir Ali was among his close disciples who drew maximum benefit from his company.

Mirza had translated Qur'an in Bengali and Hindi languages too, they were not found. It is said he wrote more than one hundred and fifty books in all, including books and booklets, most of them remaining unpublished.

He started making an Arabic-Urdu dictionary of Qur'anic words which is very comprehensive under the title of Gharib ul Quran, with explanatory notes. It was being published by the Government Printing Press under special care of Hashim Amir Ali.

He published a collection of about one thousand authentic Ahadith (Traditions of the Prophet). Its preface consisting of 8 to 9 pages is a rare work of brevity (saying too much in a few words).

He was the first Muslim to present a translation of the Qur'an into English along with the original Arabic text. His first translation into English, with the Suras arranged according to the chronological sequence suggested by Theodor Nöldeke, however, differed but a little from that of John Medows Rodwell in that the placement of two Surahs he differed from Noeldeke, and because of changing the order of these two Surahs the arrangement of eight Surahs had to be changed, which was published in two volumes with Arabic text and English rendering in 1910. The use of Arabic metal type, instead of litho, was a further improvement.

His last edition of "The Koran in English" appeared in 1955, a year before he died in May 1956, at the age of 91.

Hashim Amir Ali, dean of agriculture at Osmania University, Hyderabad, was his disciple.

== Publications ==
- Islam Explained (1909)
- The Qur’an - Arabic Text And English Translation: Arranged Chronologically: With An Abstract, Asgar & Co., Allahabad, India, (1st edition 1911-1912).
- Islam and Buddhism
- Gharib ul Quran fi Lughat ul Furqan (1947)
- "Muhammad in the Hadees, or Sayings of the Prophet Mohammad". Dominion Book Concern 1924
