= The Qur'an with Annotated Interpretation in Modern English =

English translation of the Quran

- Author: Ali Ünal
- Translators: Ali Laraki
- Language: English, Spanish
- Subject: Qur'an translation, Tafsir (Qur'anic exegesis)
- Publisher: Tughra Books, The Light Inc
- Publication date: 2006
- Pages: 1365 pages
- ISBN: 9781597840002

The Qur'an with Annotated Interpretation in Modern English is an English translation of the meanings of Qur'an written by Turkish Sunni Muslim scholar Ali Ünal. First published in 2006.

The translation comes with interpretation and exposition on the meaning of Qur'anic verses in conjunction with Asbab al-Nuzul (the reasons for revelation or the circumstances of revelation) with extensive notes of explanation borrowed from various authoritative sources on the tafsir of the Qur'an. As Fethullah Gülen notes in his foreword to this work, Ünal "aims to present, for the benefit of everyone, any truth which he has found to be in compliance with the essentials of Islam."

The work focuses particularly on the scientific facts of the Qur'an, the proofs for God's existence, and the purpose of life.

The whole work was translated into Spanish by Ali Laraki in 2009, under the title of El Sagrado Corán y Su Interpretación Comentada (English: The Holy Quran and its Interpretation Commented).

== Reception ==
The translation is praised and recommended by Fetullah Gülen in his introduction to the work. In Islam & Science, Waleed Bleyhesh al-Amri wrote that Ünal appeared to be "fully conversant with Qurʾānic scholarship, both classical and recent, and with the norms of writing tafsīr". However, he believed that Ünal's translation contained too many explanatory parentheticals. On the book cover, Bernadette Andrea, B. Jill Carroll, Robert Hunt, and Scott C. Alexander also express their praise.

== See also ==
- Risale-i Nur
- The Majestic Quran: An English Rendition of Its Meanings
- English translations of the Quran
- List of translations of the Quran
