= S. V. Mir Ahmed Ali =

Indian scholar (1902–1976)

- Born: 15 July 1902; Madras, British India
- Died: 17 September 1976 (aged 74); Chennai, Tamil Nadu, India

Philosophical work
- School: Twelver Shi'a
- Notable works: English translation of the Quran

Sajjadi Vafakhani Mir Ahmed Ali, M.A, B.O.L, B.T., M.Ed, (/ɑːˈliː/; Urdu: سَّجَّادی وفاخانی میر احمد علی; 15 July 1902 – 17 September 1976) was a Shia Islamic scholar and a religious leader.

== Early life ==
After his return from the Burma War, S.V. Mir Ahmed Ali's father received his share of the estate from his uncles and came down to Madras City with the determination to educate his three sons.

=== Education ===
S.V. Mir Ahmed Ali completed his recital of the Qur'an at the age of 9 from his maternal uncle Janab Mir Jaffer Hussain 'Peer'. He was then admitted to the Harris High School, Madras for his English education. The school mandated the study of Bible, and S.V. Mir Ahmed Ali got the opportunity to study the Holy Bible extensively so much as to win the Bible Prize and the Bible scholarship, every year. Frequent discussion with the then Principal of the institution Rev. Canon Goldsmith and Mr. Hanuman Singh, the Bible teacher ensured a thorough knowledge of Bible, having learnt by hear, most of its passages.

After the completion of the school course, he joined the clerical service in the Government Mahammadan College (later renamed to Government Art College, Madras) in clerical services. During his service, he obtained the title of Munshi Fazil, B.O.L (Bachelor of Oriental Languages) Degree and qualified himself with M.A., in Arabic and Persian. He was awarded the Assistant Lecturership in the same college where he obtained the B.T., ( Degree in teaching). He also took up the Madras University Diploma Course in German. He took a year's leave and joined the Research Course of M.Ed. degree ( Master In Education) with Psychology as his special subject. Under the guidance of Dr. G. D. Boaz, the Chief Professor and the Head of the Department of Psychology (Madras University), he submitted his and got his thesis accepted. After rejoining the college, at the instance of Dr. M. A. Huq, the then Principal of the college; he obtained the diplomas of Higher Proficiency in Arabic and Persian.

== Publication ==
During the tenure at the Government Mahammadan College, he and his friend Mr. G.A. Musa-e-Raza B.A., started a monthly magazine called the Peace Maker. The journal has a small circulation to parts of India and few places abroad.

The journal in addition to containing simple Islamic literature became a medium to answer Dr. Zewmer's mischievous article published in his Journal 'The Muslim World', under the title 'The word of God or the Word of man' in which he had presented the Bible as the Word of God and the Qur'an as the Word of Man. The silencing refutation to Dr. Zewmer through the magazine earned special popularity and attraction from the Christian world. More scholars began contributing their articles on religious philosophy. A long-standing Christian missionary publication The Catholic Register established by the Roman Catholic Diocese, Madras found the Islamic publication getting stronger every day and attracting the Christian public more, its editor complained to the then (British) Government of Madras, citing that S.V. Mir Ahmed Ali being a government official should not be indulged in the publication of any matter from the press, and consequently, the publication had to be stopped. S.V. Mir Ahmed Ali later in a small booklet 'Truth revealed' brought about the details on the success of the Peace Maker magazine.
