= Scott C. Alexander =

Scholar of Islamic studies and Christian–Muslim relations

Scott C. Alexander is a scholar of Islamic studies and Christian–Muslim relations. He is professor of Islamic studies and director of the Doctor of Ministry Program at Catholic Theological Union in Chicago, and was the founding director of the school's Catholic-Muslim Studies Program.

== Education ==
Alexander earned an A.B. from Harvard University, an M.A. and a Ph.D. from Columbia University, and an M.Phil. from Union Theological Seminary in New York. His doctorate at Columbia was in the history of religions with a concentration in Islamic studies.

== Academic career ==
Alexander has taught at Columbia University, Indiana University, Fordham University and Princeton University before joining Catholic Theological Union. At the school he has served as associate professor and later professor of Islamic studies, and as chair of the Department of Intercultural Studies and Ministry. He is currently director of its Doctor of Ministry Program.

=== Catholic-Muslim Studies Program ===
From 2000 to 2020, Alexander was the founding director of the Catholic-Muslim Studies Program at Catholic Theological Union. In the 2000s he also worked to expand the program's outreach to similar programs in Nigeria, the Middle East and Southeast Asia.

== Research and teaching ==
His teaching and research interests include medieval Muslim sectarianism, the mystical traditions of Muslim spirituality, Quranic studies, and the history and future of Muslim–Christian relations and interfaith dialogue. He has lectured on triumphalism in Muslim–Christian relations and has worked on a book project on the subject. His more recent work addresses Islamophobia as a form of anti-Black racism and interreligious allyship in graduate theological education. He has also described a research interest in the intersection of neuroscience and practical theology, particularly unconscious bias and the processes by which in-groups and out-groups are formed.

== Professional service and recognition ==
Alexander is a regular consultant on Catholic–Muslim relations for the United States Conference of Catholic Bishops and a member of the National Catholic-Muslim Dialogue. He has been co-editor of the Journal of Muslim Philanthropy and Civil Society since its founding in 2015, a member of the scholars advisory council of Georgetown University's Alwaleed Bin Talal Center for Muslim–Christian Understanding, and a member of the board of directors of the Alliance for Shared Values. From 2016 to 2019 he chaired the Theological Education Committee of the American Academy of Religion, and he served on the advisory boards of the Lake Institute on Faith and Giving at Indiana University (2004–2021) and the Martin Marty Center for the Advanced Study of Religion at the University of Chicago (2013–2019). In March 2007 he was one of five scholars awarded a Lilly Faculty Fellowship by the Association of Theological Schools. In fall 2013 he held the Walter and Mary Tuohy Chair of Interreligious Studies at John Carroll University.

== Selected works ==
- Alexander, Scott C. (1997). "Using 'Homemade' Documentary Video in Religious Studies". Journal of Religion & Film. 1 (2).
- Knowing and Loving Our Neighbors of Other Faiths (DVD). The Work of the People. 2011.
