= Nurettin Uzunoğlu =

Turkish professor

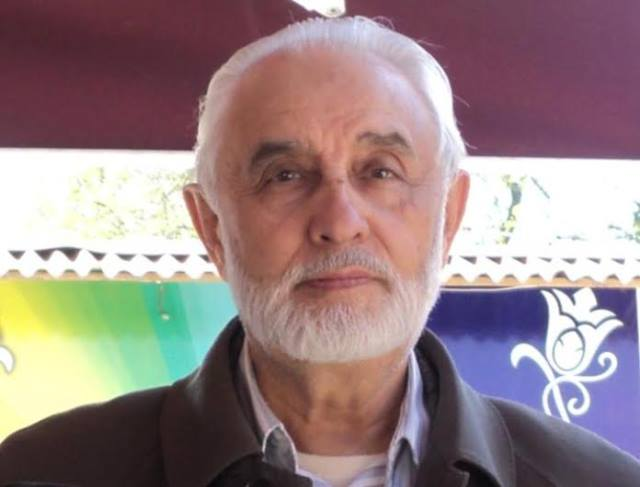
- Born: 1939; Kütahya, Turkey
- Died: October 9, 2013; Istanbul, Turkey
- Resting place: Eyüp Cemetery
- Education: Master's degree, University of Nebraska
- Alma mater: Faculty of Political Science, Ankara University
- Occupation: professor
- Writing career
- Notable work: The Majestic Quran: An English Rendition of Its Meanings

Nurettin Uzunoğlu (1939 – 9 October 2013) was a Turkish Qur'an translator and commentator, writer, missionary, political scientist, academic, and professor who worked as a lecturer at various universities in the United States and has the title of "Turkey's second youngest professor" at the age of 27. He spoke nine foreign languages, including English, German, French, Arabic, Japanese, Urdu, and Malay; and became fluent in English at a young age.

== Education ==
He completed his secondary and high school education in Kütahya, Uşak and Manisa. After graduating from the Department of International Relations and Political Science from Ankara University, he received his bachelor's degree from Northwest University in the United States and his master's degree from the University of Nebraska. He completed his doctorate on political science with the joint doctoral program between the US and Ankara University.

He worked as a lecturer at the University of Nebraska, Bellevue University and Middle East Technical University. He stayed in the US for many years and served as a visiting professor in many countries around the world, from the Middle East to Malaysia, Philippines, Japan, Hawaii, USA, Canada, Scandinavia, Egypt, Jordan, Saudi Arabia, Palestine and Libya. He gave trainings in Pakistan, India, Bangladesh, and Sri Lanka. He participated in external education programs at Ankara University, and devoted himself to being the most traveling scholar after Evliya Çelebi and Ibn Battuta.

== Works ==
During his 46-year career, he has authored 34 books on various subjects, mostly in English, including the following:

- American Aid to Turkey, 1947–1963.
- History of the Prophets.
- Islamic Law: Based on Hanafi, Shafee, Maliki, Hanbeli: Four Schools of Thought.
- The Concept of God in Islam & The 99 Attributes of God Sharh-ul Asma'ul-Husna in English.
- Judaism, Christianity & Islam: A Comparative Study of Three Divine Religions.
- The Majestic Quran: An English Rendition of Its Meanings.
- The Holy Qur'an: Translation and Commentaries.

Uzunoğlu sent the translation of the Qur'an into English to 47 heads of state around the world, including Barack Obama, Silvio Berlusconi, Angela Merkel and Vladimir Putin, and personally gifted the translation to Hillary Clinton when she was the US Secretary of State. He also has authored the world's first and only English Qur'an translation written in Braille alphabet consisting of 8 volumes and 2 thousand pages for the visually impaired.

== Death ==
He died in Istanbul on October 9, 2013, and was buried in the Eyüp Cemetery after the funeral prayer performed in Fatih Mosque.

== See also ==
- Ali Ünal
- Ahmed Hulusi
- Rank Nazeer Ahmed
- Musharraf Hussain
