= Ahmed Hulusi =

Turkish writer

Ahmed Hulusi (born 1945 in Istanbul, Turkey) is an Islamic author from Turkey, whose works focus on philosophical and religious ideas.

== Biography ==
He was born on 21 January 1945 in Cerrahpaşa, Istanbul, and was named as Ahmed, meaning ‘highly praised’, by his mother and Hulusi, meaning ‘sincere’, by his father. He spent the first 18 years of his life not following any particular religion, believing only in ‘a Creator’. Since every time he inquired about religion, he was told “do not question, just do as you are told”, he lived a seemingly ‘irreligious’ life. Three days after his father's death, on 10 September 1963, unable to refuse his mother's wish, he attended Friday prayer, where he felt an inspiration and desire to understand religion. That same day he decided to always maintain a state of ritual purity by performing ablution and committed to performing the prescribed daily prayers (salat).

He commenced his religious education by studying the eleven volumes of Sahih al-Bukhari and the whole of the Al-Kutub al-Sittah, two collections of Sunni hadiths published by the Turkish Directorate for Religious Affairs, and a translation of the Quran by Elmalılı, one of Turkey's most eminent Quranic scholars. He then spent two years undertaking in-depth studies of the modern sciences. This was then followed by an interval of intensive spiritual diets and retreats, leading him in 1965 to write his first book, Revelations (Tecelliyat). This book is particularly significant for him, as it is an amalgamation of his unique ideas and theological viewpoints at the age of 21. Also in 1965, he journeyed alone to Mecca to fulfill his pilgrimage (hajj).

Ahmed Hulusi bases his understanding of religion on the system and order denoted in the Quran by the One named Allah and has committed himself to “reading” reality as disclosed by Muhammad. Hulusi focuses on the underlying unity of everything and the oneness of existence, which he refers to as Allah. He stresses understanding the spirit of the Qur'an and the Sunnah rather than taking them out of context. He shares all of his perspectives through his writings on his website. Having studied preeminent collections of Islamic law and evaluated the works of many renowned Sufi saints (wali) and scholars, he synthesizes his findings with scientific truths and presents them as an integrated system of reality.

In order to refrain from self-promotion, he has not put his surname on any of the books he has written over the last 40 years. He does not claim to be a guru or a teacher to anybody; he chooses to have very little contact with people. He was forced to put his photo in his books after a few impostors started claiming to be Ahmed Hulusi.

He has never been a member of any political, social, religious organization, foundation, or establishment. He has spent his life as a journalist researching Islamic mysticism, or Sufism, and the modern sciences.

Due to the 28 February 1997 ‘postmodern coup’ in Turkey, Ahmed Hulusi and his wife, Cemile, moved to London, where they lived for a year, before settling in the US, where they reside currently.

== Perspective on Islam ==
He considers his teachings a spiritual understanding of Islam in a modern context. Based on Muhammad's teachings and eminent Sufi authors like Abdul Karim Jili, Abdul-Qadir Gilani, Muhyiddin ibn-Arabi, Imami Ghazali, and İbrahim Hakkı Erzurumi, he denies the idea of a deity/god to worship, claiming there is no separate external god, there is only the One, referred to as Allah in the Qur'an. His principle has always been, “Do not be a blind follower of anyone. In the light of Muhammad’s teachings, choose and walk your own path in life independently.” He recommends that people re-evaluate the original teachings of Muhammad and the Quran in the light of science, without depending on any intermediary forces. Every individual has the right, indeed, is obliged, to directly interact with the teachings of the universal system through Muhammad and shape their lives accordingly.

Due to the nature of the universal system revealed to Muhammad, jobs and positions of a religious nature are illegitimate. The only person one must follow is Muhammad. Because of this, Ahmed Hulusi does not encourage anyone to become his ‘follower’. He prefers to live a relatively reclusive life in his small town and advises people to question his teachings and to do their own research. He says, “Don’t believe me; find and verify the truth for yourself.”

== Publications ==
=== Books ===
- Decoding the Quran
- Prologue to Decoding Quran on the iBookstore
- The Essence of Man also available on the iBookstore
- Muhammad's Allah also available on the iBookstore
- The Beautiful Names also available on the iBookstore
- The Observing One also available on the iBookstore
- Universal Mysteries also available on the iBookstore
- The Truth of Life also available on the iBookstore
- Know Yourself also available on the iBookstore
- Spirit Man Jinn also available on the iBookstore
- Revelations also available on the iBookstore
- The Power of prayer

=== Videos ===
Ahmed Hulusi's channel on YouTube

== See also ==
- Ali Ünal
- Nurettin Uzunoğlu
