= Shaikh Basheer Ahmed Muhyiddin =

Sheikh Basheer Ahmed Muhuyiddin
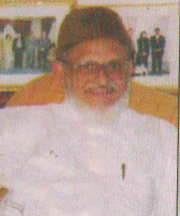
- Sheikh Basheer Ahmed Muhuyiddin
- Born: 1937; Paravanna, Malapuram, Kerala, India.
- Other name: Shaikh Basheer Ahmed Muhuyiddin
- Known for: Islamic Educationist, The author of "Quran The Living Truth". Qur'an scholar who has translated the Quran into English, Hausa, Yoruba
- Father: Ayinikkad Kunhavan Marakkarth Kammad Ali
- Website: http:// mdiathalangara.tk

Sheikh Basheer Ahmed Muhuyiddin, Arabic: الشيخ بشير احمد محي الدين) is an Islamic scholar, preacher, and author. He was born in 1937 at his hometown of Paravanna in Malapuram district. He was the third son of the Muslim scholar, Paravanna Muhyaddeen Musliyar. He pursued his primary education from Darul Uloom Vazhakkad and at Baqiyath Swalihath, Vellur. He pursued his higher education by studying abroad and finished his post graduation at Al-Azhar University, Cairo and then at Illorin University, Nigeria. While working at Darul Ifta of Saudi Arabia, he was appointed as first official of its propagation center to African countries in Nigeria. A significant portion of his life and work was spent translating the Qur'an into three Nigerian languages, Hausa, Yoruba and Ibo, and the English translation “Quran: the Living Truth". Apart from these major contributions, Sheikh Basheer has written numerous Islamic books, notable among which is the Islamic Religious Knowledge series including Quran, Hadeeth, Fiqh and Islamic History. He died on 25 June 2005.
