= Muhammed Hamdi Yazır =

Turkish philosopher and theologian (1878-1942)

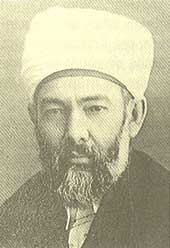

Personal life
- Born: 1878 Elmalı, Antalya, Konya vilayet, Ottoman Empire
- Died: 27 May 1942 (aged 63–64) Erenköy, Kadıköy, Istanbul, Turkey
- Main interest(s): Kalam, Islamic ethics, Tafsir

Religious life
- Religion: Islam
- Denomination: Sunni
- Jurisprudence: Hanafi
- Tariqa: Khalwati
- Creed: Maturidi

Muslim leader
- Students: Turgut Cansever

Muhammed Hamdi Yazır also known as Elmalılı Hamdi Yazır and Elmalılı (1878 – 27 May 1942) was a Turkish Maturidi theologian, logician, Qur'an translator, Qur'anic exegesis scholar, Islamic legal academic, philosopher and encyclopedist.

== Early life ==
He was born in 1878, in Elmalı district of Antalya province, then in the Ottoman Empire, and now in Turkey. He is nicknamed after his birthplace: Elmalılı. Elmalılı means "from Elmalı" or "born in Elmalı" in Turkish. His father, Hoca Numan Efendi, who is also a scholar of Islam, was from the Yazır village of Gölhisar district of Burdur province. He is from Yazir sub-branch of Oghuz branch of Turkish nation. Hoca Numan Efendi, the father of Muhammed Hamdi, went to the Elmalı district of Antalya for education when he was a child and settled there. Hoca Numan Efendi worked as a head clerk of lawsuit of the district. Yazır's mother Fatma Hanım was the daughter of Esad Efendi, who was a scholar of Islam living in Elmalı.

== Education ==
After completing primary and secondary education in Elmalı, to study Islamic sciences, in 1885, Yazır went to Istanbul which was the capital city of the Ottoman Empire at the time. He completed his university education in Bayezid Madrasah. Then he completed his education in Mekteb-i Nuvvab and became a Qadi (judge). He also received Islamic calligraphy courses from Sami Efendi and Bakkal Arif Efendi. He learned Arabic, Persian, and French during his education. He was as fluent in French as in Arabic. He translated some French books to Turkish, one of them being Gabriel Seailles's Histoire de la philosophie.

== Career ==
Muhammed Hamdi Yazır became a Qadi (judge) after completing his education in Mekteb-i Nuvvab. He worked as a full-time academic in Bayezid Madrasah from 1905 to 1908. Then, he got in the service of Sheikh ul-Islam of the time and started lecturing in Mekteb-i Mülkiye, Medreset-ul-Vaizin and Süleymaniye Madrasah. He gave "judgement of estates in mortmain" courses in Mekteb-i Mülkiye, logic courses in Süleymaniye Madrasah and fiqh (Islamic jurisprudence) in Medreset-ul-Vaizin (madrasah of preachers). He also served in the Darü'l-Hikmeti'l-İslâmiye (high council of consultation working for Sheikh ul-Islam). After a while, he became the president of the council.

== Political life ==
When he was working in service of Sheikh ul-Islam, the Committee of Union and Progress prepared a coup against the Sultan Abdul Hamid II. Yazir wrote the symbolic fatwa for the termination of the reign of Abdul Hamid II. He became a member of the senate of the Ottoman Parliament for Antalya. He strongly opposed CUP which held a nationalist and militarist position. Moreover, he served as Foundations (Vakıflar) Minister in the Ottoman Sultan Mehmed VI's Damat Ferid Pasha Cabinet.

When the republic was founded, he was giving logic courses in Medrese-t-ül Mütehassisin (a postgraduate school). When Mustafa Kemal's government abolished the medreses and replaced them with special Imam Hatip Schools, he started working for writing the first modern Turkish translation of the Quran, under Atatürk's orders. Later, he studied for 20 years in solitude. He died of cardiac deficiency on 27 May 1942 in Erenköy district of Istanbul. He is buried in Sahrayı Cedit Mezarlığı (Sahrayı Cedit Cemetery) in Kadıköy in Istanbul.

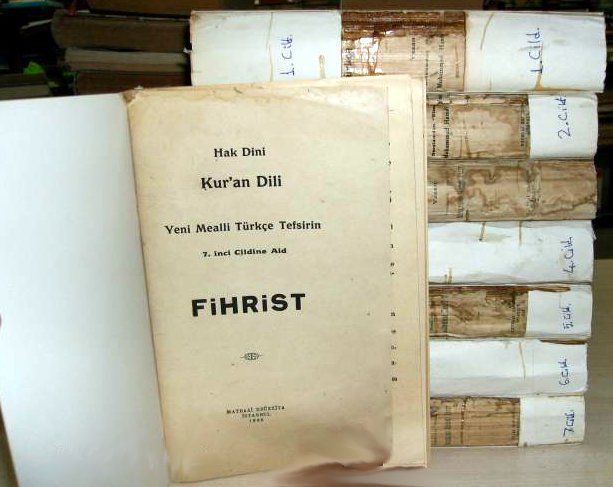
1935 print of Hak Dīni Kur'an Dili. A Qur'anic exegesis and translation in Turkish ordered by Mustafa Kemal.

== Works ==
Muhammed Hamdi Yazır worked on logic, philosophy, Islamic jurisprudence, and Islamic theology. In his philosophical works, he opposed the prevailing Western opinion that the human mind on its own is enough for reaching the absolute truth. He held the position that faith and mind together are capable of comprehending truth. In that case, his thinking is very similar to the 11th century Persian scholar al-Ghazali. He worked on Qur'anic exegesis in Maturidi context. He also worked on a dictionary of law. Additionally he translated western papers into Turkish.

=== Writings by Muhammed Hamdi Yazır ===
- Hak Dīni Kur'an Dili (1935) (A Qur'anic exegesis and translation in Turkish ordered by Mustafa Kemal)
- Tahlil-i Tarih-i Felsefe-Metâlib ve Mezahib-Maba'de't-Tabia ve Felsefe-i İlahiyye (Turkish translation of Histoire de la philosophie of Paul Janet and Gabriel Seailles)
- İrşadü'l Ahlâf fî Ahkâmi'l-Evkâf (A textbook on judgement of estates in mortmain for university students)
- Beyânul-Hak (various articles in the journals of Sırat-ı Müstakim and Sebilürreşad)
- Elmalılı Küçük Hamdi (Various articles in Beyânül-Hak and Sebîlürreşad (scholarly journals))
- Usûl-i Fıkıh (an unpublished book on Islamic jurisprudence)
- Sûrî mantık (an unpublished book on logic)
- Hukuk Kâmusu (an unfinished dictionary of law)
- Divan (an unfinished book)
