= Hak Dīni Kur'an Dili =

Quran translation

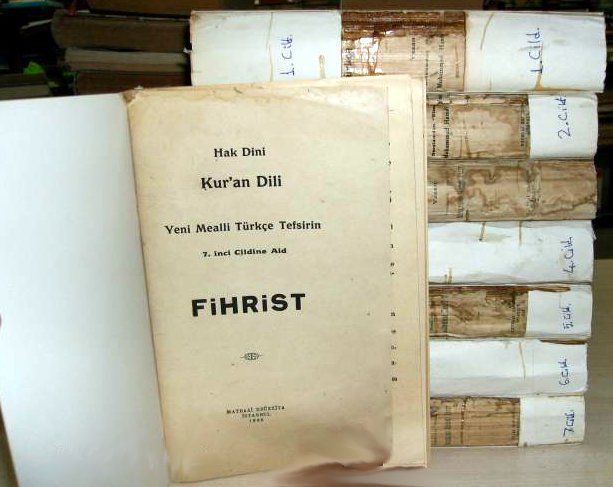
- Hak Dīni Kur'an Dili
- Author: Muhammed Hamdi Yazır
- Language: Modern Turkish
- Genre: Quran
- Publication place: Turkey
- Pages: 5500

Hak Dini Kur'an Dili (English: The Truth [God]'s Religion Quran's Language) written by Muhammed Hamdi Yazır, Turkish Islamic theologian born in Antalya, Turkey. Hak Dini Kur'an Dili was ordered by Mustafa Kemal Atatürk. It is the first Qur'an translation in Modern Turkish.

== See also ==
- Quran
- Islam
