= Alexander Ross (writer) =

Scottish writer (c. 1590 – 1654)

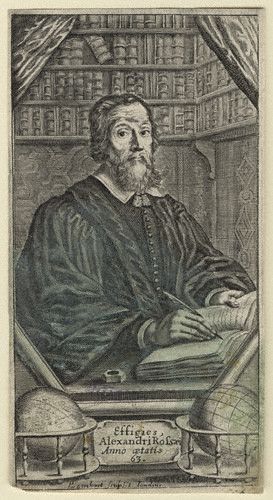
- Alexander Ross, 1653 engraving by Pierre Lombart
- Born: c. 1590; Aberdeen, Scotland
- Died: 24 February 1654; Bramshill, Hampshire, England
- Education: King's College, University of Aberdeen
- Occupations: Clergyman, translator
- Writing career
- Notable works: The Alcoran of Mahomet (the Qur'an), translated into English (attributed )

Alexander Ross (c. 1590 – 1654) was a prolific Scottish writer and controversialist. He was Chaplain-in-Ordinary to Charles I.

== Life ==
Ross was born in Aberdeen, and entered King's College, Aberdeen after completing his studies at Aberdeen Grammar School, in 1604. About 1616 he succeeded Thomas Parker in the mastership of the free school at Southampton, an appointment which he owed to Edward Seymour, 1st Earl of Hertford. By 1622 he had been appointed, through William Laud's influence, one of Charles I's chaplains, and in that year appeared The First and Second Book of Questions and Answers upon the Book of Genesis, by Alexander Ross of Aberdeen, preacher at St. Mary's, near Southampton, and one of his Majesty's Chaplains. He was vicar of St Mary's Church, Carisbrooke in the Isle of Wight from 1634 to his death; he left Southampton in 1642.

In Pansebeia, Ross gave a list of his books, past and to come. He died in 1654 at Bramshill House in Hampshire, where he was living with Sir Andrew Henley, and in the neighbouring Eversley church there are two tablets to his memory. Ross left many legacies, and his books were left to his friend Henley, an executor and guardian to a nephew, William Ross.

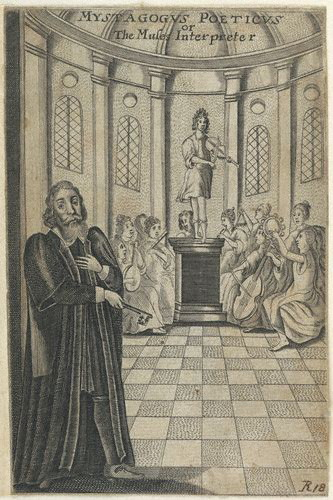
Alexander Ross, 1648 engraving by William Faithorne.

Among Ross's friends and patrons were Lewis Watson, 1st Baron Rockingham, John Tufton, 2nd Earl of Thanet, Thomas Howard, 21st Earl of Arundel, and John Evelyn. His correspondence with Henry Oxenden, in English and Latin, is in the British Museum.

He is not the Alexander Ross of the Aberdeen doctors, who remained in Scotland and died in 1639.

== Works ==
Richard Westfall calls him "the vigilant watchdog of conservatism and orthodoxy". He was concerned to defend Aristotle and repel the Copernican theory, as it gained ground. In 1634 he published a work on the immobility of the earth, attacking Nathanael Carpenter and Philip Landsberg. He became involved in a debate with John Wilkins and Libert Froidmond, around the beliefs of Christopher Clavius. He attacked Thomas Browne (defending, for instance, the beliefs that crystal is a sort of fossilized ice, and that garlic hinders magnetism), and many other contemporary ideas. In other controversies he took on Sir Kenelm Digby, Thomas Hobbes, and William Harvey.

=== Authorship of the Alcoran of Mahomet ===
In his 1734 translation of the Qur'an, George Sale attributes to Alexander Ross the translation into English of André du Ryer's 1647 French translation of the Qur'an, L'Alcoran de Mahomet. This attribution is possibly spurious although a forward warning the reader of the book’s content is by Ross, written sometime after he was summoned to the House of Commons to answer for the book's impending publication, and so he was certainly involved in the book’s production. Sale is critical of the quality of both the Arabic-French translation work as well as the French-English translation work. Since the publication of Sale's translation, Ross has been widely credited with this work.

=== Publications ===
- Rerum Judaicarum Libri Duo (1617)
- Questions and Answers on the First Six Chapters of Genesis (1620)
- Tonsor ad cutem Rasus (1629)
- Commentum de Terrae Motu Circulari Refutatus (1634)
- Virgilii Evangelisantis Christiados Libri xiii (1634), a cento composed entirely from Virgil
- The New Planet, no Planet, or the Earth no Wandering Star, against Galilaeus and Copernicus, (1640)
- God's House, or the House of Prayer, vindicated from Profaneness (1642) sermons
- God's House made a Den of Thieves (1642) sermons
- Philosophical Touchstone, or Observations on Sir Kenelm Digby's Discourse on the Nature of Bodies and of the Reasonable Soul, and Spinosa's Opinion of the Mortality of the Soul, briefly confuted (1645)
- Medicus Medicatus, or the Physician's Religion cured (1645)
- The Picture of the Conscience (1646)
- Mystagogus Poeticus, or the Muses' Interpreter (1647)
- The Alcoran of Mahomet: Translated out of Arabique into French by the Sieur Du Ryer, Lord of Malezair, and Resident for the King of France at Alexandria, and Newly Englished for the Satisfaction of All That Desire to Look into Turkish Vanities, to Which is Prefixed the Life of Mahomet, ... with a Needful Caveat, or Admonition, for Those Who Desire to Know What Use May Be Made of, or If There Be Danger in Reading, the Alcoran (1649)
- Abridgement of Christian Divinitie (1650). This is Ross' translation of Johannes Wolleb's Compendium Theologiae Christianae (1626).
- Enchiridium Oratorium et Poeticum (1650)
- Arcana Microcosmi, or the Hid Secrets of Man's Body discovered, in Anatomical Duel between Aristotle and Galen; with a Refutation of Thomas Browne's Vulgar Errors, from Bacon's Natural History, and Hervey's book De Generatione (1651)
  - Web version of the text
- The History of the World, the Second Part, in six books, being a Continuation of Sir Walter Raleigh's (1652)
- Πανσεβεια ("Pansebeia"), or View of all the Religions in the World, with the Lives of certain notorious Hereticks (1652)
- Observations upon Hobbes's Leviathan (1653)
- Animadversions and Observations upon Sir Walter Raleigh's History of the World (1653)
- Three Decads of Divine Meditations, whereof each one containeth three parts. 1. History. 2. An Allegory. 3. A Prayer. With a Commendation of a Private Country Life.
- Four Books of Epigrams in Latin Elegiacs
- Mel Heliconium, or Poetical Honey gathered out of the Weeds of Parnassus
- Melisomachia
- Colloquia Plautina
- Chronology, in English
- Chymera Pythagorica
