= Arthur John Arberry =

British scholar of Middle East Studies (1905–1969)

- Born: 12 May 1905; Portsmouth, England
- Died: 2 October 1969 (aged 64); Cambridge, England
- Burial place: Ascension Parish Burial Ground, Cambridge
- Spouse: Sarina Simons Arberry (m. 1932)

Academic background
- Education: Portsmouth Grammar School
- Alma mater: Pembroke College, Cambridge

Academic work
- Institutions: Cairo University & Cambridge University
- Notable works: The Koran Interpreted

Arthur John Arberry (12 May 1905, in Portsmouth – 2 October 1969, in Cambridge) FBA was a British scholar of Arabic literature, Persian studies, and Islamic studies. He was educated at Portsmouth Grammar School and Pembroke College, Cambridge. His English translation of the Qur'an, The Koran Interpreted, is popular amongst academics worldwide.

== Academic career ==
Arberry served as head of the Department of Classics at Cairo University in Egypt. He eventually returned home to become the Assistant Librarian at the Library of the India Office. During the Second World War he was a Postal Censor in Liverpool and was then seconded to the Ministry of Information, which was housed in the newly constructed Senate House of the University of London. Arberry held the Chair of Persian at the School of Oriental and African Studies (SOAS), University of London, in 1944–47. He subsequently became the Sir Thomas Adams's Professor of Arabic at Cambridge University and a Fellow of Pembroke College, Cambridge, his alma mater, from 1947 until his death in 1969. He is buried in Ascension Parish, Cambridge, together with his wife Sarina Simons Arberry (1900-1973). She was Romanian by birth; Arberry first met her in Cairo and they married at Cambridge in 1932.

Arberry is also notable for introducing Rumi's works to the West through his selective translations and for translating the important anthology of medieval Andalusian Arabic poetry The Pennants of the Champions and the Standards of the Distinguished. His interpretation of Muhammad Iqbal's writings, edited by Badiozzaman Forouzanfar, is similarly distinguished.

Arberry also introduced to an English-speaking audience the work of Malta's national poet, Carmelo Psaila, popularly known as Dun Karm, in the bilingual anthology Dun Karm, Poet of Malta.

== Works ==
- The Rubai'yat of Jalal Al-Din Rumi: Select Translations Into English Verse (Emery Walker, London, 1949)
- The Rubai'yat of Omar Khayyam. Edited from a Newly Discovered Manuscript Dated 658 (1259–60) in the Possession of A. Chester Beatty Esq. (Emery Walker, London, 1949) — unbeknown to Arberry or Alfred Chester Beatty, the "newly discovered manuscript" was a twentieth-century forgery.
- Sufism: An Account of the Mystics of Islam (London: Allen & Unwin, 1950)
- Avicenna on Theology (London: John Murray, 1951)
- Omar Khayyam. A New Version, Based upon Recent Discoveries (London: John Murray, 1952) — based upon the Beatty and another forged manuscript
- The Secrets of Selflessness (John Murray, London, 1953)
- Moorish Poetry: A Translation of 'The Pennants', an Anthology Compiled in 1243 by the Andalusian Ibn Sa'id (University Press, Cambridge, 1953),
- The Koran Interpreted (Allen & Unwin, London, 1955)
- The Seven Odes: The First Chapter in Arabic Literature (Allen & Unwin, London, 1955)
- Classical Persian Literature (1958)
- Dun Karm, poet of Malta. Texts chosen and translated by A.J. Arberry; introduction, notes and glossary by P. Grech. Cambridge University Press 1961.
- Muslim Saints and Mystics, A translation of episodes from the 'Tazkirat al-Awliya’ (Memorial of the Saints) originally written by Farid al-Din Attar (Routledge & Kegan Paul, London, 1966)
- Javid Nama (Allen & Unwin, London, 1966)
- Poems of Al-Mutanabbi (University Press, Cambridge, 1967)
- Discourses of Rumi, A translation of Fihi Ma Fihi, (Samuel Weiser, New York, 1972)
- Mystical Poems of Rumi, Translated by A. J. Arberry, (University of Chicago Press, 2009)
