= Mustafa Khattab =

Canadian–Egyptian Muslim scholar

Imam Mustafa Khattab

Personal life
- Education: Al-Azhar University

Religious life
- Religion: Sunni Islam

Mustafa Khattab is a Canadian–Egyptian Muslim scholar, imam, and university chaplain. He holds a professional ijâzah in the Ḥafṣ style of recitation. He is known for his translation of the Quran in "The Clear Quran" series.

== Career ==
He is a Canadian-Egyptian authority on interpreting the Quran. He was a member of the first team that translated the Ramadan night prayers (Tarawîḥ) live from the Sacred Mosque in Mecca and the Prophet's Mosque in Medina (2002-2005). Khattab memorized the entire Quran at a young age, and later obtained a professional ijâzah in the Ḥafṣ style of recitation with a chain of narrators going all the way to Muḥammad. He received his PhD, M.A., and B.A. in Islamic Studies in English with Honors from Al-Azhar University's Faculty of Languages & Translation. He lectured on Islam at Clemson University (OLLI Program, 2009–2010), held the position of Lecturer at Al-Azhar University for over a decade starting in 2003, and served as the Muslim Chaplain at Brock University (2014-2016). He is a member of the Canadian Council of Imams and a Fulbright Interfaith Scholar. He has served as an Imam in the US and Canada since 2007 and is the translator of The Clear Quran Series (2015), the author of The Clear Quran Series for Kids (2020), Shukran (an illustrated story for children, 2020), The Clear Quran Series Dictionary (2021), The Nation of Islam (2011) and Outfoxing Fox News (2017), and contributor to the Encyclopedia of Muslim American History (2010).

== Publications ==
The Clear Quran Series: A Thematic English Translation is a Canadian English interpretation of the Quran, published internationally by the Al-Furqaan Foundation. In 2020 it became the default translation available on quran.com.

Khattab has stated that a mistranslation of the Arabic word dābbah was an early motivation to begin the project. Whereas Khattab understood the term to mean a living being, translations often rendered the word as animal. Khattab's translation has been officially approved by Al-Azhar and was endorsed by the Canadian Council of Imams and many other Muslim organizations and scholars worldwide.

Khattab eschews Early Modern English, which many Western readers are familiar with from the King James Version of the Bible, and instead uses modern Canadian English to appeal to a broader audience.
