= Hashim Amir Ali =

Islamic scholar (born 1903)

Hashim Amir Ali (Urdu: هاشم أمير على), (8 May 1903 – 1987), was an Islamic scholar and author.

== Life ==
In 1938, Ali came under the influence of Mirza Abul Fazl, who sparked his interest in and reverence for the Qur'an. Ali, a scholar of wide erudition and clear vision, possessed a special insight into the Qur'an. He dedicated over thirty years to translating the Qur'an into poetic English, aiming to capture its beauty and rhythm. Recognizing the importance of the chronological order of the Qur'anic revelation, he meticulously arranged it accordingly. His translation, titled The Message of the Qur'an: Presented in Perspective was published in 1974.

Ali taught at the Jamia Millia Islamia in the 1960s after earning his doctorate at Cornell University in 1929.

Ali was an educator and an active advocate of calendar reform for approximately ten years. He held a prominent position as a leading Muslim authority on calendar matters. He initiated a movement in Hyderabad to synchronize the dates of the Fasli months with the Gregorian calendar. Finally, in 1946, he succeeded in persuading the Nizam to authorize the proposed reform. This significant achievement bolstered his confidence as a liberal Muslim, leading him to delve into the analysis of introducing The World Calendar effectively within the Islamic realm. In 1953, he returned to America under a fellowship from the Fulbright and Ford Foundation.

Hashim Amir-Ali died in 1987 in Banjara Hills, Hyderabad. He was survived by one daughter and two sons. His sons, Hyder Amir-Ali and Asad Amir-Ali, as well as his daughter, Naveed Jehan Reza, currently reside in the U.S.A.

== Publications ==
- Rural Research in Tagore's Sriniketon (1934)
- The Student's Quran : An Introduction. (1961)
- The Environs of Tagore - Then and Now. (1961)
- Facts and Fancies - A book of essays. (1947)
- The Meos of Mewat; old neighbours of New Delhi. (1970)
- The Message of the Qur'an : Presented in Perspective. (1974)
- Upstream Downstream : Reconstruction of Islamic Chronology (1978)
