= L'Alcoran de Mahomet =

Translation of the Quran into French; the third western translation of the Quran

L'Alcoran de Mahomet ("The Qur'an of Muhammad") was the third Western translation of the Qur'an, preceded by Lex Mahumet pseudoprophete ("[The] Law of the False Prophet Muhammad") and the translation by Mark of Toledo. The translation was made from Arabic into French by the French orientalist André du Ryer in 1647.

== English translation by Alexander Ross ==
Two years later, in 1649, Alexander Ross translated it to English from French, and included the following title-page:

"The Alcoran of Mahomet, Translated out of Arabick into French. By sir Ryer, Lord of Malezair, and Resident for the French King, at ALEXANDRIA. And Newly Englished, for the satisfaction of all that desire to look into the Turkish Vanities. To which is prefixed, the Life of Mahomet, the Prophet of the Turks, and Author of the Alcoran. With a Needful Caveat, or Admonition, for them who desire to know what Use may be made of, or if there be danger in Reading the ALCORAN."

== Gallery ==
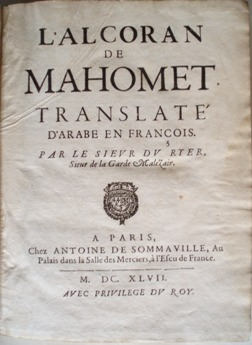
L'Alcoran de Mahomet, André du Ryer, 1647.

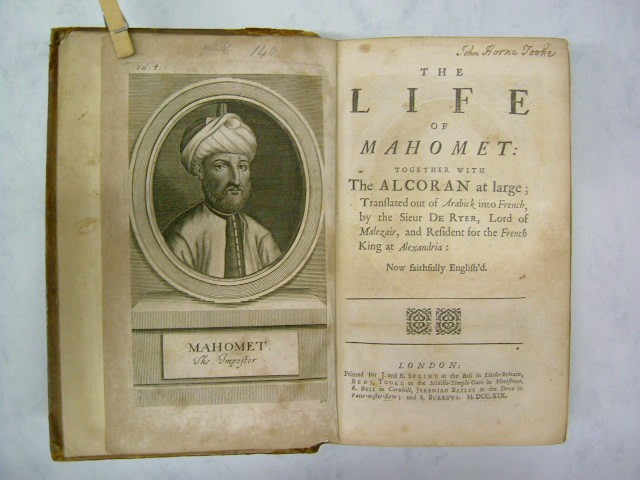
An engraving of Muhammad in The Life of Mahomet (1719)

== See also ==
- List of translations of the Qur'an
