= The Koran Interpreted =

1955 English-language Quran translation

The Koran Interpreted is a translation of the Qur'an (the Islamic religious text) by Arthur John Arberry. The translation is from the original Arabic into English. First published in 1955, it is one of the most prominent written by a non-Muslim scholar. The title acknowledges the orthodox Islamic view that the Qur'an cannot be translated, and can merely be interpreted.

Khaleel Mohammed writes that "the translation is without prejudice and is probably the best around," while M. A. S. Abdel Haleem, himself a translator of the Qur'an, writes that:

Arberry shows great respect towards the language of the Qur'an, particularly its musical effects. His careful observation of Arabic sentence structure and phraseology makes his translation very close to the Arabic original in grammatical terms ... [however] this feature, along with the lack of any notes or comments, can make the text seem difficult to understand and confusingly unidiomatic.

Originally published in two volumes, the first containing Quranic chapters (suwar) 1-20, the second containing 21-114, the text continues to be printed to this day, normally in one single volume.
