= André du Ryer =

French orientalist

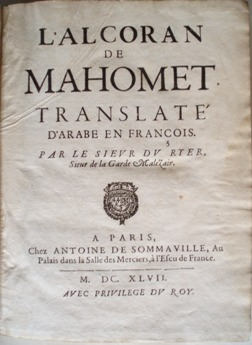
L'Alcoran de Mahomet, André du Ryer, 1647.

André Du Ryer, Lord of La Garde-Malezair (b. Marcigny, Bourgogne, c. 1580; d. 1660 or 1672) was a French orientalist who produced L'Alcoran de Mahomet, the third western translation of the Quran.

== Biography ==
Du Ryer was diplomatic envoy to Constantinople and French consul to Alexandria.

In 1630, he published a grammar of the Turkish language in Latin. In 1634, he translated Gulistan, or the Empire of the Roses, by the Persian writer Saadi. In 1647, he published L'Alcoran de Mahomet, the first integral translation of the Quran into a European vernacular language (the previous two translations from the Arabic had been into Latin). The book was interdicted by the Council of Conscience under the pressure of one of its members, Vincent de Paul. This censure did not impede the book's diffusion. Du Ryer left in manuscript a Turkish-Latin dictionary.

He became Secretary-Interpreter of King Louis XIII for Oriental languages after his return to France in the year 1630. Louis XIII assigned him to a mission in Persia, to take up negotiations with the king of that eastern land, at the finalizing of his accord concerning commercial exchanges between France and Persia. The Ottoman Sultàn Murat IV, who attentively supervised Franco-Persian relations, solemnly received André Du Ryer in 1632 and retained the Frenchman awhile at his court, for to send him back to Paris with a friendly letter to the French king.

Sources vary as to whether he died in 1660 or 1672.

== Works ==
- Grammaire turque (1630)
- Gulistan, ou l'empire des roses (1634)
- L'Alcoran de Mahomet (1647)

== See also ==
- Islamic scholars
