= Ali Ünal =

Turkish author and journalist (born 1955)

Ali Ünal (born 19 January 1955) is a Turkish author and former chief writer at Zaman newspaper, which was shut down following the failed 2016 Turkish Coup D'état.

== Biography ==
Ünal was born on 19 January 1955 in Uşak, Turkey. He is often associated with the Gülen movement, an Islamic group in Turkey. In addition to being an author, Ali Ünal is a prolific translator of works with an Islamic theme into English, and has translated into English many works by Fethullah Gülen, the spiritual leader and founder of the Gülen Movement. In 2006, Ali Ünal's English translation of the Quran was released. Ali Ünal's translation has been noted for its use of contemporary English, which makes it more readable than some classical Quran translations. Entitled The Qur'an with Annotated Interpretation in Modern English, the work also included extensive annotations by the translator.

Ali Ünal's published books as author and editor include Islam Addresses Contemporary Issues, Islamic Perspectives on Science: Knowledge and Responsibility, The Resurrection and the Afterlife, The Prophet Promised in World Scriptures, An Introduction to Islamic Faith and Thought, Living in the Shade of Islam, Living the Ethics and Morality of Islam, Fethullah Gülen: An Advocate of Dialogue, and General Principles in the Risale-i Nur Collection for a True Understanding of Islam.

Ali Ünal has about twenty translations from Turkish to English and more than ten from English to Turkish. He has more than twenty books in Turkish.

== Detention ==
Ali Ünal was the daily head columnist for Zaman, a Turkish newspaper described as a media outlet for Fethullah Gulen. Ünal denied being a leader for Gulen or the attempted coup. In 2016, he was acquitted of a charge related to the coup attempt.

He was detained on 14 August 2016 by the Uşak Provincial Security Directorate Trafficking and Organized Crime Control Bureau in Eşme District during an operation against the Fethullah Gülen Community. He was accused of "attempting to overthrow the constitutional order", "establishing and managing an armed terrorist organization" and "membership in a terrorist organization". According to Stockholm Center for Freedom, the court presented 17 of his articles published in Zaman as evidence. On 14 November 2018 he was sentenced to 19 years and 6 months in prison. Six other journalists from Zaman were previously convicted of similar charges.

In 2023, the United Nations Working Group on Arbitrary Detention published an opinion stating that Ünal's detention was arbitrary.

== See also ==
- Ahmed Hulusi
- Nurettin Uzunoğlu
