= Richard Bell (Arabist) =

British Arabist (1876–1952)

Richard Bell (1876 – 1952) was a British Arabist. He was lecturer in Arabic at the University of Edinburgh and also served as Minister of Newton Wamphray, a small country parish from 1907 to 1921. On returning to Edinburgh, he spent his remaining years at the university in the study of the Qur'an. Between 1937 and 1939 he published a translation of the Qur'an, and in 1953 his Introduction to the Qur'an was published (revised in 1970 by W. Montgomery Watt). Both works have been influential in Quranic studies in the west.

He was an early investigator of Christian influences on the development of Islam.

== Works ==
- The Qur'an. Translated, with a critical re-arrangement of the Surahs 2 vols, Edinburgh University Press, 1937–39
- The Origin of Islam in its Christian Environment The Gunning Lectures. Edinburgh University Press, 1925
- Introduction to the Qurʾān Islamic Surveys 8. Edinburgh University Press, 1953, revised by W. Montgomery Watt 1970, new edition 1995 ISBN 978-0-7486-0597-2
