= Ahmadiyya in the United States =

Islamic movement

Ahmadiyya is an Islamic branch in the United States. The earliest contact between the American people and the Ahmadiyya movement in Islam was during the lifetime of Mirza Ghulam Ahmad. In 1911, during the era of the First Caliphate of the Community, the Ahmadiyya movement in India began to prepare for its mission to the United States. However, it was not until 1920, during the era of the Second Caliphate of the Ahmadiyya movement, that Mufti Muhammad Sadiq, under the directive of the caliph, would leave England on SS Haverford for the United States. Sadiq established the Ahmadiyya Muslim Community in the United States in 1920. The U.S. Ahmadiyya movement is considered by some historians as one of the precursors to the Civil Rights Movement in America. The Community was the most influential Muslim community in African-American Islam until the 1950s. Today, there are approximately 15,000 to 20,000 American Ahmadi Muslims spread across the country.

== History ==
=== Early contact ===
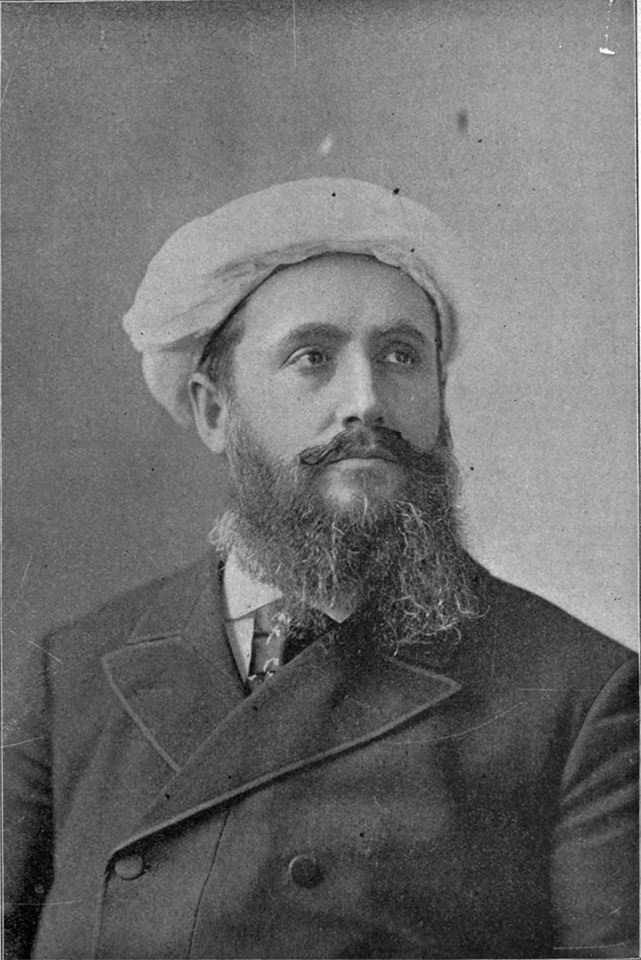
Alexander Russell Webb, one of the earliest Anglo-American converts to Islam

The earliest contact between the American people and Ahmadi Muslims in India was during the early era of Mirza Ghulam Ahmad. In 1886, roughly three years prior to the establishment of the Ahmadiyya movement, Alexander Russell Webb initiated a correspondence with Ahmad, in response to an advertisement published by the latter. Before 1886, Webb studied several eastern religions, including Buddhism. His first interaction with the founder of the Ahmadiyya movement was the first serious step towards understanding Islam. The initial correspondence consisted of four letters, two from both sides. Although Webb's letters indicate that he was becoming inclined towards Islam, to the extent of showing willingness to propagate it, the letters do not demonstrate that he had converted to the religion. However, the Ahmadiyya Muslim Community does stress that the correspondences were instrumental in Webb's later conversion to the religion. Jane Smith writes that the correspondences were "key to [Webb's] conversion to Islam." On his visit to India in the early 1890s, Webb stated that it was because of Ahmad that he had the "honour to join Islam." His correspondence with Ahmad began during a period when the latter had gained fame throughout India as one of Islam's leading champions against Christian missionary activity in India during the colonial era. However, after the initial correspondences with Webb, Ahmad quickly became one of Islam's most controversial figures due to his messianic claims. As a result, on his visit to India, Webb abstained from paying a visit to Ahmad. In spite of this, he remained in contact with Ahmad until his death in 1908. In 1906, he wrote to Ahmad, regretting his decision to avoid him:

Alas! I came to India but did not visit you, although it was through you I found the right guidance. In not meeting you I tried to please some people so that they would give donations. They did not keep their promises and no donations were made. Now I regret greatly that I deprived myself of meeting a man of God for such people.

Although Webb kept in contact with Ahmadis and read Ahmadi literature up until his death in 1916, the Ahmadiyya literature does not record whether Webb was an Ahmadi Muslim, nor does his work show allegiance towards Ahmadiyya eschatology. Today he is known as one of the earliest Anglo-American converts to Islam.

Other early American Muslims who had ties with the movement during Ahmad's lifetime included A. George Baker, a contact of Webb and former Protestant clergyman who had converted to Islam. Baker was among a number of European and American figures with whom Mufti Muhammad Sadiq, a disciple of Ahmad, had established contact. He was a subscriber and contributor of the Ahmadi journal The Review of Religions, a journal with which Webb had also corresponded. Baker was mentioned in the fifth volume of Ahmad's Barahin-e-Ahmadiyya (1905; The Muhammadan Proofs). He maintained contact with the movement from 1904 until his death in 1918. Unlike Webb, Baker professed allegiance to the Ahmadiyya movement and is counted within it as one of the earliest American Ahmadis.

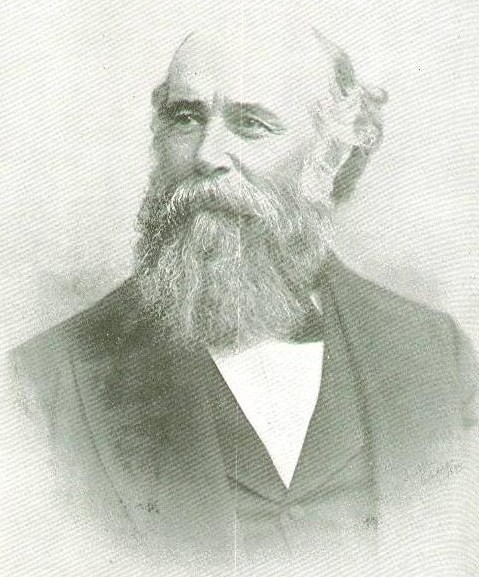
John Alexander Dowie

Ahmad was an enthusiastic writer and was noted for his extensive correspondences with prominent Americans and Europeans, including some of the leading Christian missionary figureheads of his period. Among them was John Alexander Dowie, a Scottish-born American faith healer, who founded the Christian Catholic Apostolic Church and the theocratic city of Zion, along the banks of Lake Michigan, and established himself as the "General Overseer" of the theocracy. In December 1899, moments before the turn of the century, Dowie claimed to be God's Messenger and two years later, in 1901, he claimed to be the spiritual return of the Biblical prophet Elijah, and styled himself as "Elijah the Restorer," "The Prophet Elijah", or "The Third Elijah." In his controversial relationship with Islam, Dowie prophesied the destruction of all Muslims around the world within a period of 25 years, upon the return of Jesus Christ. In 1903, when Ahmad heard Dowie's claims in India, particularly his prophecies concerning the Muslim world, he proposed a "Prayer Duel" and set out certain conditions. Ahmad requested Dowie to set aside his prophecies concerning the Muslims for the moment and offered his own life instead. He challenged Dowie to willingly pray for Ahmad's death instead, while simultaneously Ahmad prays for Dowie's destruction. The proposal was published in dozens of local and national newspapers across the United States and queried Dowie's response to the challenge. Dowie neither accepted the challenge, nor did he decline it. His followers claimed that he did not have time to respond, as he was busy preparing for his rally of rallies to New York City. However, in 1903, he responded to the challenge indirectly, stating in his periodical Leaves of Healing:

People sometimes say to me. "Why do you not reply to this, that and the other thing?" Reply! Do you think that I shall reply to the gnats and flies? If I put my foot on them I would crush out their lives. I give them a chance to fly away and live.

Dowie died in 1907, roughly a year before Ahmad. In the years before his death, Dowie was deposed. The interplay between Ahmad and Dowie and the circumstances leading to the latter's death is seen by members of the Ahmadiyya movement as a sign of truthfulness of Ahmad as the Promised Messiah. Following Dowie's decline and his eventual death, multiple newspapers ran a discussion of Dowie's death in the context of Ahmad's prophecies. The Boston Sunday Herald ran a double page feature entitled "Great is Mirza Ghulam Ahmad The Messiah."

=== Arrival ===
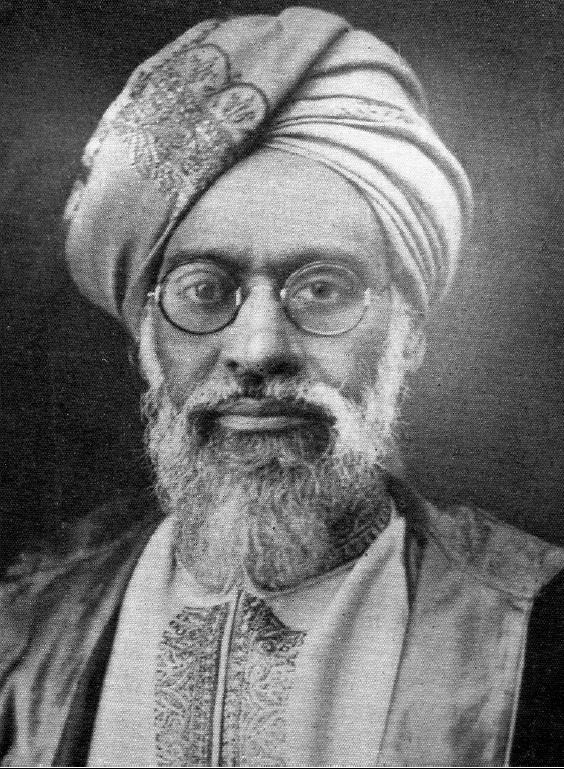
Mufti Muhammad Sadiq, the first Ahmadi missionary to the United States

Despite the early onset of interactions with the American people, the Ahmadiyya Muslim Community only began to prepare for its mission to the United States in 1911, during the era of the First Caliphate. However, it was not until almost a decade later, on January 24, 1920, during the era of the Second Caliphate, that Mufti Muhammad Sadiq, the first missionary to the country, would embark on SS Haverford from England, for the United States. On board, Sadiq preached the Islamic faith on each day he spent on the translantic liner. With many passengers intrigued by Sadiq's teachings on the life of the Islamic Prophet Muhammad and the claims of Mirza Ghulam Ahmad as the return of the Messiah, seven people of Chinese, American, Syrian and Yugoslavian heritage converted to the Islamic faith. However, on the arrival of SS Haverford on the shores of Philadelphia, the authorities accused Sadiq of preaching a religion that permitted polygamous relationships. As an Ahmadi Muslim, Sadiq believed that the law of the land precedes the practice of non-essential Islamic principles. Despite this, and his assurance that he did not preach polygamy on board, the authorities refused his entry into the United States and demanded him to take a return trip back to Europe. Sadiq refused and submitted an appeal. Having successfully appealed against the decision, during the course of which he was temporarily detained and placed in a Philadelphia Detention House in Gloucester, New Jersey, for seven weeks, he continued his preaching efforts, but now limited to the inmates of the prison. Before his discharge, he managed to attract 19 people from Jamaican, Polish, Russian, German, Belgian, Portuguese, Italian, French heritage. Perhaps in a connection with his own ordeal with the authorities, Sadiq would later remark that under the U.S. immigration laws Jesus would not be permitted entry into the United States.

Mirza Basheer-ud-Din Mahmood Ahmad, the second caliph of the Community, with reference to the early missionary work in the western world, including that of Sadiq, later coined the term "Pioneers in the spiritual Colonization of the Western World," alluding to the Western colonization of the eastern hemisphere, the traditional East–west divide and their respective spiritual and secular identities. Several headlines remarked Mufti Muhammad Sadiq's arrival into the U.S., such as "Hopes to Convert U.S.", "East Indian Here With New Religion" and "Optimistic in Detention," alluding to Sadiq's continued missionary effort while taken custody on board. The Philadelphian Press, recounting Sadiq's experience, states:

While many religious sects in the United States are spending many thousands of dollars and sending hundreds of philosophers and teachers to the wilds of Tibet, the far reaches of Arabia and Hindustan and to the unexplored regions of Africa and China, Mufti Muhammad Sadiq, after travelling thousands of miles, alone and friendless, hopes to begin his crusade to convert Americans to the doctrines taught by the prophet Ahmad, of whom he is the principal disciple.

=== 1920: New York City ===
Historical headquarters of the U.S. Ahmadiyya Muslim Community. Since 1994, the headquarters of the movement are in Silver Spring, Maryland.

In April 1920, Sadiq was permitted entry into the United States. Possibly attracted to New York's reputed culture, he journeyed to the city and assembled the first national headquarters of the Ahmadiyya movement on Manhattan's Madison Avenue. As a philologist, with proficiency in Arabic and Hebrew linguistics, Sadiq successfully published articles on Islam in multiple American periodicals within a period of a few months, including in the New York Times. Moreover, as a lecturer and a charismatic public speaker, Sadiq secured approximately fifty lectures across several cities in the Northeast, including Chicago, Detroit, Grand Haven in Michigan and his locale, New York City. As such, within a period of a few weeks, a dozen people of Christian and Muslim backgrounds converted to the Ahmadiyya interpretation of Islam. Among those were some of the earliest converts to Islam in the United States, who converted to Islam in the early 1900s, such as Ahmad Anderson and George Baker. While a missionary in England, before his arrival into the United States, Sadiq had a dream concerning a female American convert to the faith. The moment S. W. Sobolewski walked into the Community's headquarters on Madison Avenue, Sadiq interpreted her to be the fulfilment of his dream. Sobolewski would later join the movement, and be given the name Fatimah Mustafa. She became renowned as the first white American female to convert to Islam. Nonetheless, the most active female preacher of the movement during the 1920s was an African American, Madame Rahatullah.

=== 1920–1950: Chicago–Detroit ===
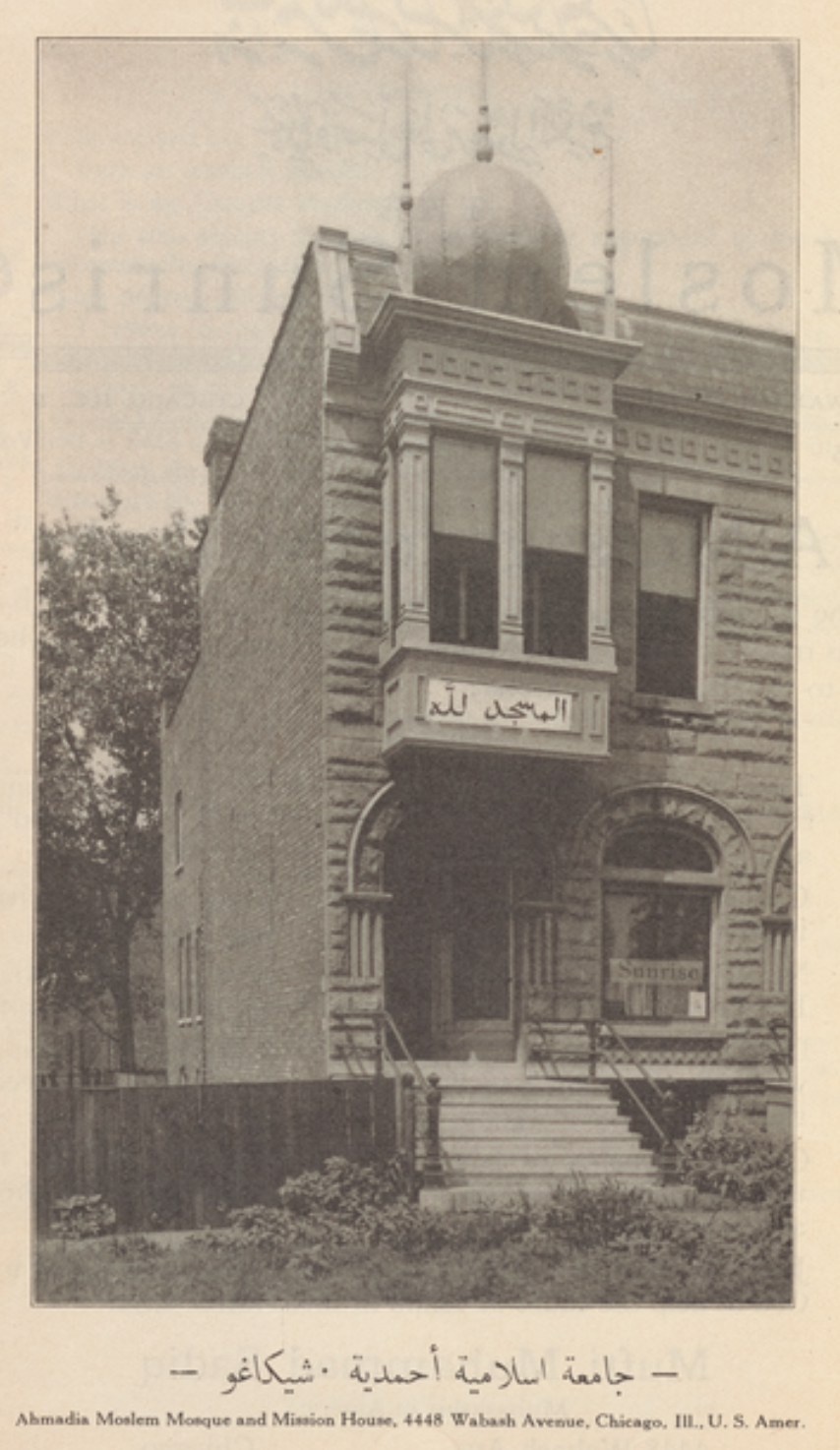
The first building owned by the Ahmadiyya in the United States at 4448 S. Wabash, Chicago, published in The Moslem Sunrise in May, 1923.

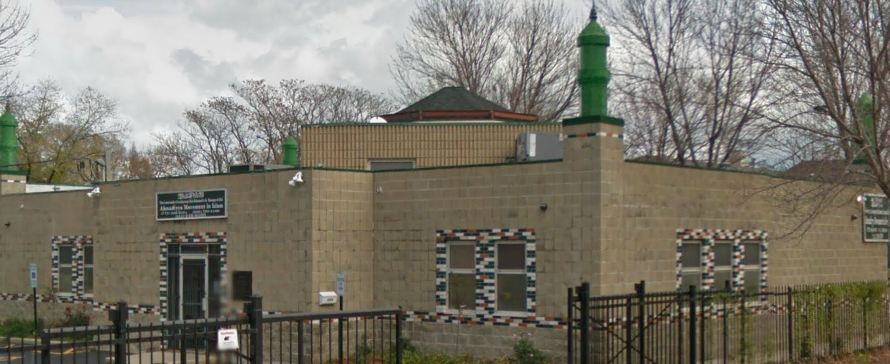
Named in honour of Mufti Muhammad Sadiq, Wabash Avenue is today the site of the Al-Sadiq Mosque, the oldest standing mosque in the United States.

In October 1920, within a period of a few months of Sadiq's arrival to New York City, Sadiq moved the headquarters to Chicago, Illinois. Accompanying this was the shift of America's Ahmadiyya Muslim Community towards the problem of racial separatism, with particular focus on discrimination of black Americans. Perhaps triggered by segregation of African American Muslims and Arab Muslims who arrived in Illinois as labourers during the early 20th century, the Ahmadis made various attempts to unite and reconcile Muslims of different racial backgrounds and ethnicities. During the winter of 1920, Sadiq was elected president of an intra-Muslim society, aiming to combat separatism and promote multi-racial unity among Muslims across the United States. Mohni, a non-Ahmadi Muslim and editor of the alserat, an Arabic newspaper was elected secretary. Shortly after, within the same year, Sadiq moved the national headquarters of the Community to Highland Park, in Detroit, Michigan. The city attracted Muslim workers of diverse ethnic backgrounds. The move came in an attempt to link various Muslim communities across the region.

In 1922, Sadiq once again returned to Chicago and re-established the national headquarters of the movement at 4448 Wabash Avenue. A converted house was used to serve as a mosque and a mission house. The mission house was from where the oldest Islamic magazine The Moslem Sunrise was to be published from. While based in Chicago, Sadiq continued to deliver his public lectures on Islam at schools, clubs and lodges across the Midwest. Many a times he was successful in removing misconceptions concerning the religion and occasionally his speeches attracted converts. In 1923, Sadiq gave multiple lectures at the Universal Negro Improvement Association, as a result of which he converted 40 members of the fraternal organization to Islam. In September 1923, Sadiq left the United States for India. He was replaced by Muhammad Din, another missionary to the Community. During his three years, Sadiq had converted 700 Americans to Islam. Named in honour of Mufti Muhammad Sadiq, Wabash Avenue is today the site of the Al-Sadiq Mosque, the oldest standing mosque in the United States.

In contrast to the early converts to the movement who generally belonged to diverse ethnic backgrounds, the converts during Sadiq's Chicago-era were largely African American, with relatively less white American. The cities of Chicago and Detroit, and to some degree, St. Louis, Missouri, and Gary, Indiana, were major centres of Ahmadiyya missionary activity during the 1920s. Muhammad Yaqoob, formerly Andrew Jacob; Ghulam Rasul, formerly Mrs. Elias Russel and James Sodick, a Russian Tartar, were some of the key figures of the Ahmadiyya activity. Some African American converts emerged as prominent missionaries of the Community. For example, Ahmad Din, who formerly may have been a Freemason or a member of the Moorish Science Temple, was appointed as a missionary in St. Louis, Missouri. Din is said to have acquired roughly 100 converts in the city. J. H. Humpharies, one of Din's converts, became an active missionary of the Ahmadiyya Community himself, after becoming disillusioned with Christianity. Humpharies was a Belgian-Congolese immigrant who studied at the Tuskegee Institute for the evangelical Protestant ministry.

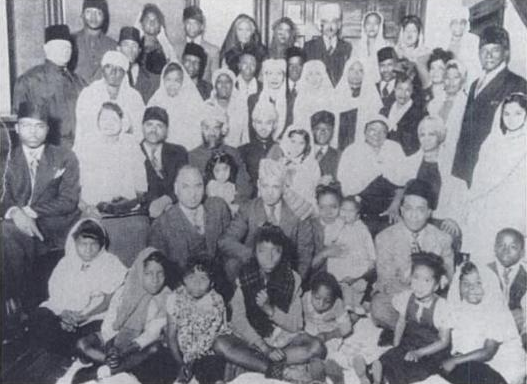
Early converts to the Ahmadiyya movement. Two missionaries, Sufi Bengalee and Khalil Nasir, are sitting at the center.

In the late 1920s, Sufi Bengalee arrived in the United States and replaced Muhammad Din as a missionary. Bengalee resumed Sadiq's tradition of giving lectures throughout the country. The lectures varied from talks on the life of the Islamic prophet Muhammad to the question of overcoming racial prejudice in the United States. Within a few years of his arrival, he gave over seventy lectures, some of which were facilitated by the multi-racial ecumenical Christian organization, Fellowship of Faiths. Venues that were sponsored by the organization included the Chicago Temple, the First Congregational Church, the People's Church and the Sinai Temple Men's Club. Many of these lectures catered for large number of audiences, up to and including 2500 people. Other settings for talks included institutions of higher education, such as Northwestern University and the University of Chicago. Many talks were featured in newspapers, such as the Chicago Daily Tribune and the Chicago Daily News. Although in contrast to Sadiq's era, the Ahmadiyya Community toned down its multi-racial rhetoric, perhaps in response to FBI's campaign to divide American Muslim groups in suspicion of potential sedition, it continued to address the issue of racism. At a lecture at the People's Church discussing racism, Bengalee stated:

Treat the colored people in a truly democratic spirit. Do not shut the doors of your churches, hotels, schools, and homes against them. Let them enjoy all the privileges which you possess. If they are poor, help them. If they are backward, uplift them, but for heaven's sake do not despise them.

In August and September 1932, the Ahmadiyya movement participated in the World Fellowship of Faiths Convention. Opened with a message from the caliph and world head of the Ahmadiyya movement, Mirza Basheer-ud-Din Mahmood Ahmad, the convention exhibited a speech on "Islam, Promoting World Peace and Progress," delivered by Muhammad Zafarullah Khan, an Ahmadi Muslim and a former president of All-India Muslim League. In one conference held on September 1, 1935, Bengalee attempted to give a practical example of favourable race relation among his converts. He introduced a white convert, Muhammad Ahmad, and a black convert, Omar Khan. The two discussed Islamic qualities concerning race relations. Perhaps, the most conspicuous was a conference at the Chicago Temple Building, attended by speakers of various religious and racial backgrounds. The conference which was entitled, "How Can We Overcome Color and Race Prejudice?" was attended by over 2000 people. By the 1940s, the Ahmadiyya movement had between 5000 and 10,000 members in the United States, a small speck in sight of the growing 2 million members worldwide. In light of this and a number of political and cultural concerns and rising tensions in the Muslim world, the African American identity and its local issues were occasionally obscured. Moreover, during the 1940s, the Ahmadiyya movement began to shift away from its focus on the African Americans, and again towards the general public.

During the 1940s, the cities of Chicago, Washington, D.C., Pittsburgh, Pennsylvania, Kansas City, Missouri, and Cleveland, Ohio, were major centres of the Ahmadiyya missionary activity. Yusef Khan, a prominent Ahmadi teacher from Pittsburgh, was responsible for the education of a splinter group of the Moorish Science Temple. Omar Cleveland and Wali Akram, both African American Ahmadi Muslim in Cleveland, Ohio, were key figures during this period. Cleveland published multiple articles on The Moslem Sunrise. As a consequence of Akram's work, there were perhaps 200 converts in the city, the majority of which were African American. In the city, there were frequent inter-ethnic and inter-religious marriages among the Ahmadi Muslims.

=== The Moslem Sunrise ===
In the summer of 1921, Sadiq founded the first Islamic magazine in the United States, The Moslem Sunrise and published it quarterly, with its first issue being released on July 21, 1921. The cover of each issue displayed a sunrise over the North American continent, perhaps insinuating the rise of the Islam in the United States and a prophetic symbolism of a saying of the Islamic Prophet Muhammad, which stated "In the Latter Days, the sun shall rise from the West." In just the first quarter, 646 requests were received and roughly 2,000 packages were sent. Approximately 500 copies of the publication were sent to Masonic lodges and 1,000 copies of Ahmadiyya literature, including copies of the publication, were mailed to libraries across the country. The recipients included several contemporary celebrities such as Henry Ford, Thomas Edison and the then President of the United States, Warren Harding.

As a consequence of colonization of Muslim lands, and thus the rising contact with the Muslim world, Islam was becoming an increasing victim of criticism from the American media. Sadiq, and the American Ahmadiyya Muslim Community utilized The Moslem Sunrise as a tool to defend Islam and the Quran against Christian polemics. Recognizing racial intolerance in the early 20th century America, Sadiq also popularized the Islamic quality for inter-racial harmony. The publication had a profound influence on African American-Islam relations, including the early development of the Nation of Islam and the Moorish Science Temple. On the other hand, the publication strained Sadiq's relationship with mainstream American Protestant Christianity and the American media. While discussing the Detroit race riot of 1943, the magazine would describe the situation as a "dark blot in the country's good name." Roughly five years later, in 1948, the magazine documented 13,600 churches belonging to Presbyterian, Lutheran and Unitarian Christian denominations and concluded that only 1,331 had "colored members." When Sadiq arrived in the country, he envisioned a multi-racial movement and inter-religious harmony with the dominant Protestant communities in America. However, many white Protestants of that period, with whom Sadiq came into contact with, as Sadiq later realized, were unwilling to work towards the Ahmadi Muslim ideal of an American society. Consequently, the American Ahmadi missionary activity shifted more towards the African American populations.

=== 1950–1994: Washington, D.C. ===
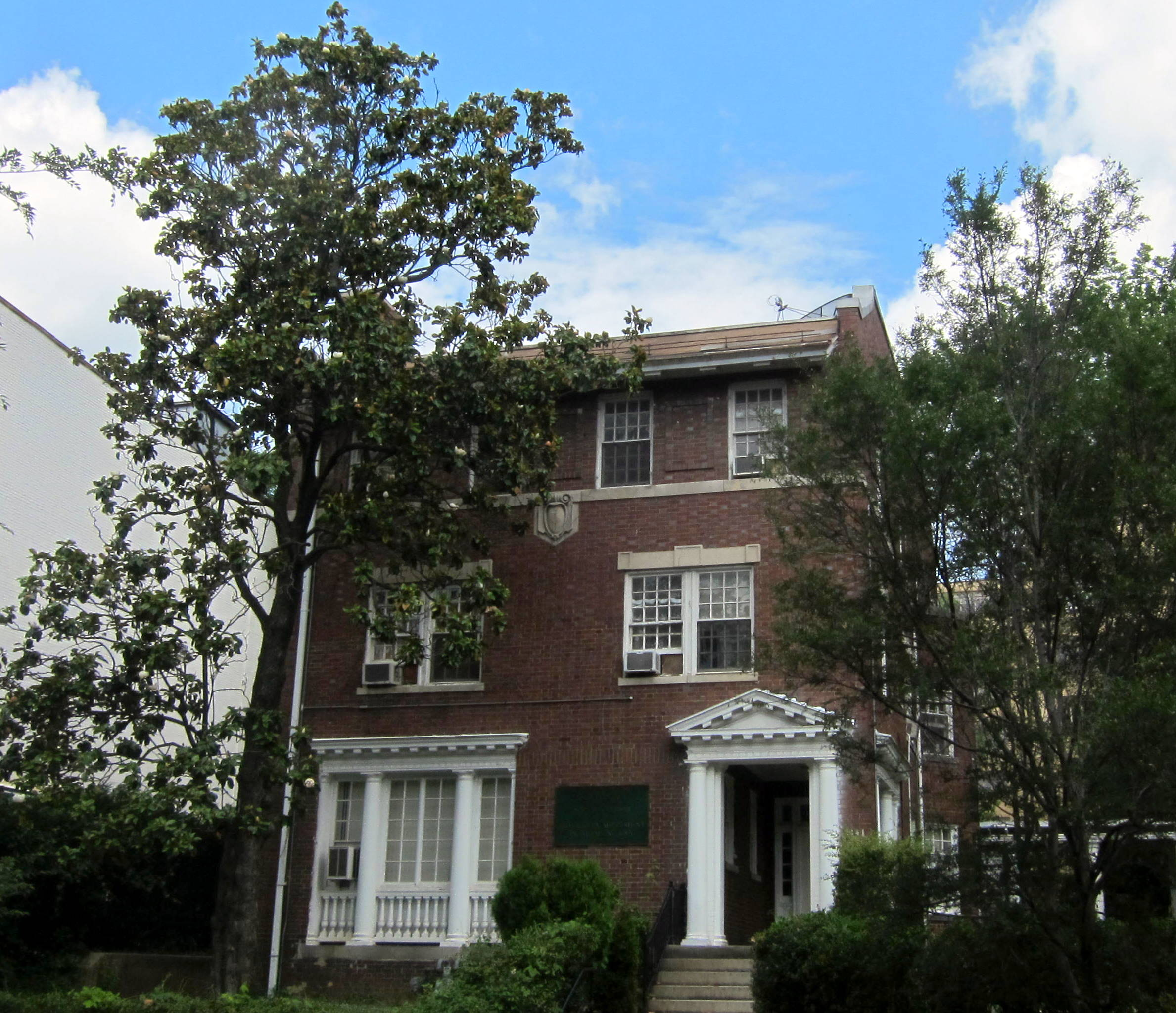
The American Fazl Mosque was the first mosque in the capital district of the United States.

In 1950, the American Ahmadiyya movement shifted their headquarters to Washington, D.C., and established the American Fazl Mosque which served as the headquarters for over four decades, until the early 1990s. The 1950s was an era when many African American musicians were introduced to Islam and thrived as members of the Ahmadiyya Muslim Community.

Over the late 20th century, the Ahmadiyya influence on African American Islam subsided to a degree. The Community did not draw as many followers as it did in its early history. Multiple reasons have been postulated for this. Rise of black nationalism among African Americans, as opposed to Ahmadi ideal of multi-racial global identity has been cited as one possible reason. After the 1950s, the Nation of Islam, which generally caters for black Americans, began to draw more followers than the Ahmadiyya movement. On the other hand, with the rise of Muslim immigration from the Arab world, African Americans may have desired to "arabize" their Islamic identity, which contrasts to the South Asian heritage of early Ahmadi missionaries in the country. Subsequently, since the 1970s, Sunni Muslims began to draw large converts from the African American community as well. However, push factors that may have also contributed to the slow development of the Community include clash of cultures between African Americans and the growing immigrant Ahmadi communities of Pakistani heritage. It has been argued that the missionaries may have brought effects of colonialism with them and insisted on Indian cultural norms on the one hand, and denied African American culture on the other. In the decades of the 1970s and 1980s, the Ahmadiyya Community continued to attract small, though significant number of converts from among the African American populations. In spite of the rise of Muslim immigrant populations from the Middle East, the Community continued to be an exemplary multi-racial model in the changing dynamics of American Islam, which was often wrought with challenges of diversity, and conjectures of racial superiority. It has been argued that it had the potential for partial acculturation along class lines.

== Journeys by caliphs ==
=== Caliph IV ===
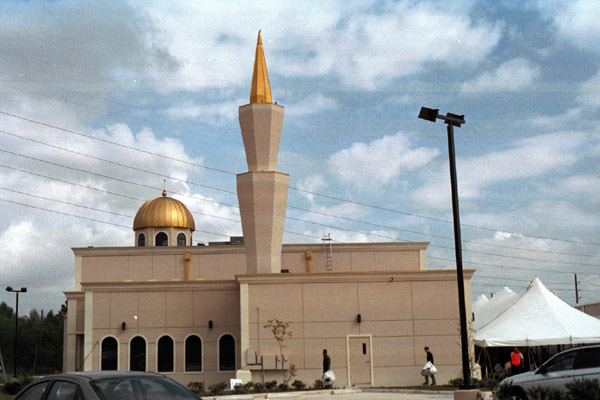
Baitus Samee, Houston, Texas, was one of the five large mosque projects sanctioned in the United States by the fourth caliph

In the 1980s, Mirza Tahir Ahmad, the fourth caliph and worldwide head of the movement sanctioned five large mosque projects, to be built in and around major cities in the United States, including Los Angeles, Chicago, Houston and Washington, D.C. In 1987, the caliph toured the United States and laid foundation stones for multiple mosques across the country. For example, on October 23, 1987, he laid the foundation stone for the Baitul Hameed Mosque in Chino, California with a brick specially bought from Qadian, India, the birthplace of Mirza Ghulam Ahmad. The mosque was inaugurated by the caliph on his second trip in 1989.

=== Caliph V ===
Mirza Masroor Ahmad, the current and fifth caliph of the Ahmadiyya Muslim Community attended the Annual Convention of the United States in June 2012. As part of his visit, on 27 June 2012, he also delivered a keynote address at a bi-partisan reception co-sponsored by the Tom Lantos Human Rights Commission and the United States Commission on International Religious Freedom at the Rayburn House Office Building in Capitol Hill, Washington, D.C., entitled "The Path to Peace: Just Relations Between Nations." The reception featured remarks by House Democratic Leader Nancy Pelosi, U.S. Senator Robert Casey, U.S. Members of Congress Brad Sherman, Frank Wolf, Mike Honda, Keith Ellison, Zoe Lofgren, and U.S. Chairwoman for the U.S. Commission on International Religious Freedom Katrina Lantos Swett. Lofgren also presented Ahmad with a copy of a bipartisan U.S. House of Representative resolution (H. Res 709) welcoming him to Washington D.C. and honoring his contributions to peace. In total, more than 130 dignitaries, including 30 members of U.S. Congress, members of the diplomatic corps, members of uniform services, NGO leaders, professors, thought leaders and inter-faith and community leaders attended the event.

On his first trip to the West Coast of the United States on 11 May 2013, Mirza Masroor Ahmad delivered a keynote address entitled, "Islamic Solution to Achieve World Peace," at a "Global Peace Lunch" at the Montage Hotel in Beverly Hills, CA. Over 300 dignitaries participated in the event. Special guests included: California Lieutenant Governor Gavin Newsom, California State Controller John Chiang, Los Angeles Mayor Eric Garcetti, Los Angeles County Sheriff Lee Baca, former California Governior Gray Davis, U.S. Congresswoman Karen Bass, U.S. Congresswoman Gloria Negrete McLeod, U.S. Congresswoman Judy Chu, U.S. Congresswoman Julia Brownley and U.S. Congressman Dana Rohrabacher. Los Angeles Mayor Eric Garcetti and Los Angeles City Councilman Dennis Zine presented Ahmad with a special golden key to the city.

== Influence ==
=== American Islam ===
Ahmadi Muslim mosques across the country. There are no Ahmadi mosques in the states of Alaska.

The U.S. Ahmadiyya Muslim Community under the leadership of Mufti Muhammad Sadiq provided the first multi-racial community experience for the African American Muslims. Until the 1960s, most of the Islamic literature would be published by the Ahmadiyya movement. The Community published the first Islamic magazine and the first Quran translation in the United States. According to Turner, the Ahmadiyya movement was "arguably the most influential community in African-American Islam until the 1950s."

Although at first Ahmadiyya efforts were broadly concentrated at over large number of racial and ethnic groups, subsequent realization of the deep-seated racial tensions and discrimination made Ahmadi Muslim missionaries focus their attention to mainly African Americans and the Muslim immigrant community and became vocal proponents of the Civil Rights Movement. The Ahmadi Muslims offered the first multi-racial community experience for African American Muslims, which included elements of Indian culture and Pan-Africanism.

Over the late 20th century, the Ahmadiyya influence on African American Islam subsided to a degree. The Community did not draw as many followers as it did in its early history. However, Ahmadi Muslims continued to be an influential force, educating numerous African Americans that passed through its ranks. Often working behind the scenes, the Community had a profound influence in the African American-Islam relations including the early development of the Nation of Islam, the Moorish Science Temple and American Sunni Islam. In particular, the Community is said to have influenced Elijah Muhammad, the leader of the Nation of Islam, and his son, Warith Deen Mohammed, who became a Sunni Muslim. While Malcolm X was in Norfolk Prison Colony, he was visited by an Ahmadi missionary, Abdul Hameed; pseudo-named as Omar Khalil in literature. Hameed later sent him a book of Islamic prayers in Arabic which Malcolm did memorize phonetically. While a member of Nation of Islam in prison, he was impressed by the Ahmadi teachings. After his release in 1952, Malcolm repeatedly attempted to incorporate the Nation of Islam into a more traditional form of Islam. It has been suggested that this may have been the reason why he once identified himself as an "Asiatic." He later stated that "Allah is One God, not of one particular people or race, but of All the Worlds, thus forming All Peoples into One Universal Brotherhood." He would repeat the notion of a universal and multi-racial faith, which according to Louis DeCaro can genealogically be seen descending from the influence of the Ahmadiyya movement.

=== Jazz ===
The Ahmadiyya movement was the main channel through which many African American musicians were introduced to Islam during the mid-20th century. It was contended that converting to a Muslim faith provided spiritual protection from harmful pitfalls that accompanied the profession, alongside a safeguard from the stigma of white supremacy. Islam was a force which impeded the deterioration of the mind and body through physical and spiritual deterrents. For example, by teaching the importance of keeping the body as well as the spirit clean, it offered an opportunity to clear the musicians from the labyrinth of American oppression and the myths about black Americans. Some Ahmadi converts included Ahmad Jamal, a pianist from Chicago; Dakota Staton, a vocalist and her husband, Talib Dawud, a trumpeter, both from Philadelphia; and Yusef Lateef, a Grammy Award-winning saxophonist from New York City, who became the spokesperson for the U.S. Ahmadiyya Muslim Community. Other members of the Community included the drummer Art Blakey, the double bassist Ahmed Abdul-Malik, the reed player Rudy Powell, the saxophonist Sahib Shihab, the pianist McCoy Tyner, and the trumpeter Idrees Sulieman. Blakey was introduced to Ahmadiyya through Dawud, and the two started a Quran study group as well a rehearsal band from Blakey's apartment in Philadelphia. The latter evolved into an influential Jazz combo, The Jazz Messengers, led by the drummer, Art Blakey. The term "messengers" in Islam refers to a group of people assigned to special missions by God to guide humankind. In Ahmadiyya in particular, the term amalgamated with "Jazz" embodied a form of an American symbolism of the democratic promise of Islam's universalism. Initially an all Muslim group, the group attracted a large number of jazz musicians.

The Muslim faith began to grow among musicians when some of the early Ahmadi musicians began to raise money in order to bring and support Ahmadiyya missionaries from the Indian subcontinent. Articles on Ahmadi musicians would be published across popular publications. In 1953, Ebony published articles, such as "Moslem Musicians" and "Ancient religion attracts Moderns," although the magazine attempted to downplay the influence of Islam. Despite the fact that the role of music in Islam was a subject of debate among the South Asian Ahmadis, the musicians, while donning Islamic attire, combined Islamic themes and their struggle for civil rights in their recordings. At times sounds from the Middle East and Asia would be assimilated into the songs. This would give rise to song titles such as Abdullah's Delight, Prayer to the East and Eastern Clouds. Although Dizzy Gillespie, Miles Davis, and John Coltrane did not become Ahmadi Muslims, they were influenced by the spirit of Islam bought by the Ahmadis. A Love Supreme, one of Coltrane's greatest pieces of work, considered by some as the greatest Jazz album of all time, was deeply influenced by the work of the Ahmadiyya movement. In the liner notes of the album, Coltrane repeatedly echoes Basmala, the opening verse of almost every chapter of the Quran: "Now and again through the unerring hand of God, I do perceive his ... Omnipotence ... He is Gracious and Merciful."

== Demographics ==
Between 1921 and 1925, there were 1,025 converts to the Ahmadiyya Muslim Community, many of whom were African American from Chicago and Detroit. By the 1940s, the Ahmadiyya movement had between 5000 and 10,000 members in the United States. By the 1980s, there were roughly 10,000 Ahmadi Muslims in the country, of whom 60% were African-Americans. The remainder consisted of immigrant populations from Pakistan, India and the African continent. Today, there are roughly 45,000 to 60,000 Ahmadi Muslims across the country. Although Ahmadi Muslims have a presence across several U.S. states, sizeable communities exist in New York City, Chicago, Detroit, Los Angeles, Washington, D.C., Baltimore, and in Dayton, Ohio.

== Muslims for Life blood drives ==
Since the tenth anniversary of 9/11, members of the Ahmadiyya Muslim Community have been holding an annual blood drive in remembrance of those who lost their lives in the attacks. While working with Muslims for Life, a U.S. Ahmadiyya charitable initiative, and the American Red Cross, the Community in its first year of its collection, collected 11,000 pints of blood. The initiative comes in an effort to bring together different people, amid the rising tensions in the post 9/11 era. It also comes in an attempt to honor the victims of the attack.
