= Ahmadiyya translations of the Quran =

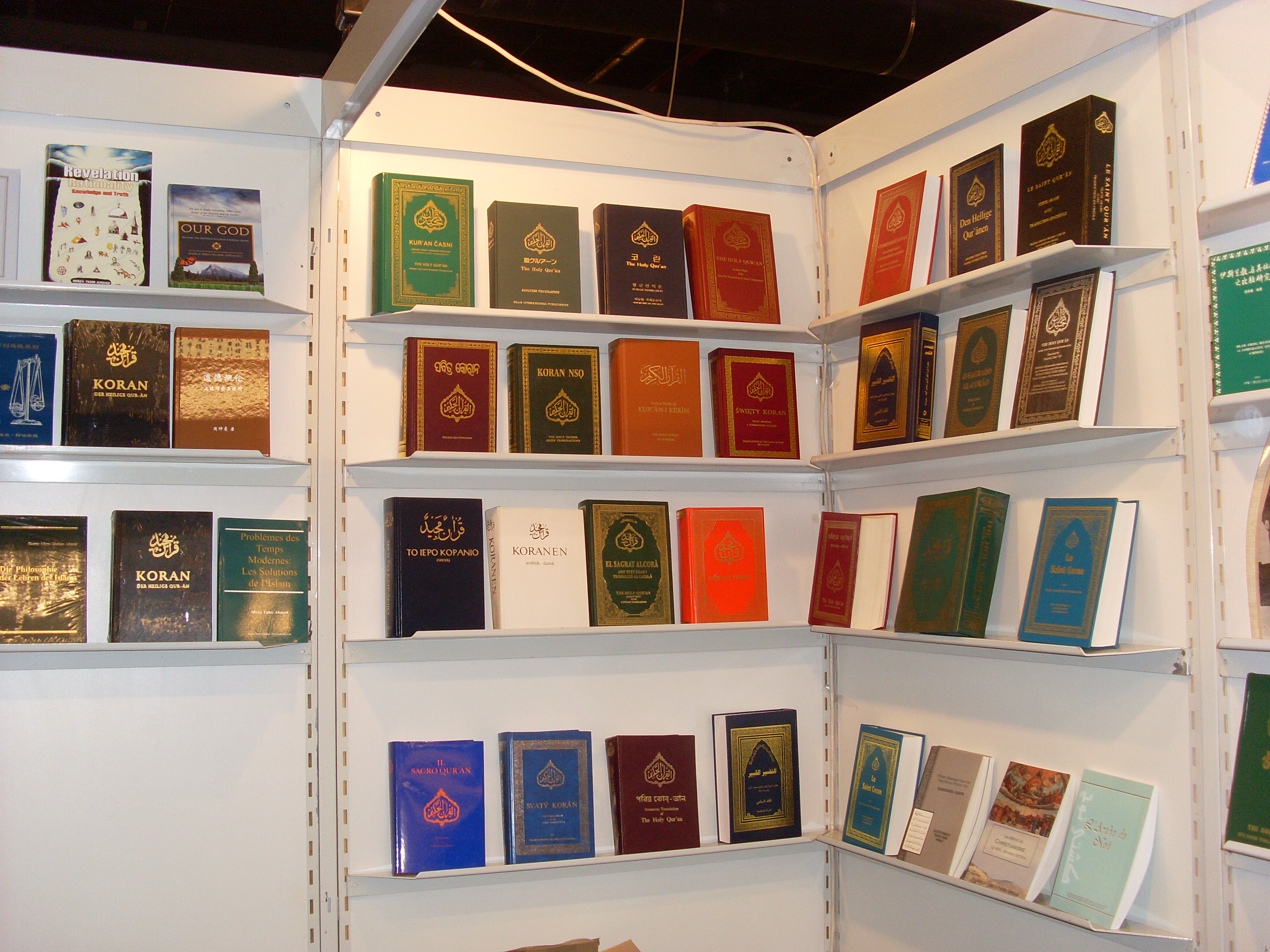
Some of the many Quran translations by Ahmadiyya translators at the 2009 Frankfurt Book Fair

The Ahmadiyya movement has translated the Quran into more than 70 languages. Portions of the scripture have been translated into additional other languages. The Lahore Ahmadiyya Movement has produced translations into at least 7 languages. In the late 1980s and the early 1990s, the number of translations being produced by the Ahmadiyya movement increased.

Some of the earliest translations of the Quran were produced by Ahmadiyya scholars. Today, many languages only have translations of the Quran produced by the Ahmadiyya Community. All translations are published alongside the original Arabic text.

== Publications ==
The Quran translations authored by Ahmadiyya scholars always feature translated verses alongside the original Arabic text. Before the translations are published, they are checked, scrutinized, and proof-read for errors by multiple people. A similar procedure is undertaken when revised versions of the translations are produced. In particular, guidance is sought from the Ahmadiyya Caliph with regards to textual and linguistic issues. Since the majority of the Quran translations have been published in the 1980s, most translations have sought advice from Mirza Tahir Ahmad and Mirza Masroor Ahmad, the fourth and fifth Ahmadiyya Caliphs, respectively.

== Complete translations ==
Year	Language	Title	Example (1:1)	External links
1953 (Note: The project was started in 1945)	Dutch	De Heilige Qur'an met Nederlandse Vertaling	In naam van Allah, de Barmhartige, de Genadevolle.	Web
1953	Swahili	Qur'an Tukufu; Pamoja na Tafsiri na Maelezo Kwa Swahili	Kwa jina la Mwenyezi Mungu, Mwingi wa rehema, Mwingi wa ukarimu.	Web PDF
1954	German	Der Heilige Qur-ân: Arabisch und Deutsch	—	Online version PDF
1955	English	The Holy Quran - Arabic Text and English translation	—	Online version PDF
1967	Danish	Koranen: med dansk oversaettelse	—	Online version PDF version
1970	Esperanto	La Nobla Kurano	Je la nomo de Allah, la Donema, la Pardonema.	Web PDF
1970 (Note: Revised in 2006.)	Indonesian	Al Qur'an dengan Terjemahan dan Tafsir Singkat	Aku baca dengan nama Allah, Maha Pemurah, Maha Penyayang.	PDF
1974	Luganda	Kur'āni Entukuvu mu Luganda	—	Web PDF
1976	Yoruba	Alkurani Mimọ	—	—
1985	French	Le Saint Coran: Texte arabe et traduction français	—	PDF
1986	Italian	Il Sacro Qur'an	—	PDF (selected verses)
1987	Fijian	—	—	—
1987	Russian	Священный Коран: Арабский текст c русским переводом	—	Online version PDF
1988 (Note: Revised in 2016. (in Japanese))	Japanese	聖クルアーン	—	Web PDF
1988	Kikuyu	Kũrani Theru	—	Web PDF
1988	Korean	꾸란 한글번역본	—	Web PDF
1988	Portuguese	O Sogrado Al-Corão: Texto arabe e tradução portuguêsa	—	Online version PDF version
1988	Spanish	El Sagrado Corán con texto en Árabe y traducción al Español	—	Online version (including short commentary) PDF
1988	Swedish	Den Heliga Qur'anen: Arabisk Text med Svenska översättning	—	PDF
1989	Greek	Το Ιερό Κοράνιο	—	Online
1989	Malay	Terjemahan dan Pecahan Loghat Alquranul Karim	-	PDF (selected verses)
1989	Persian	قرآن مجيد - ترجمه فارسی	—	Online PDF
1989	Vietnamese	Thánh Thư Koran	—	Web PDF
1990 (Note: Revised in 2003.)	Albanian	Kurani Kerim; Arabisht - shqip	Në emër të Allahut Rahman dhe Rahim.	Online PDF
1990	Czech	Svatý Korán: Arabský text a Český překlad	—	PDF version
1990	Chinese	古兰经 阿文原文－中文译释	—	Web
1990	Igbo	Koran Nsọ	—	—
1990	Mende	Kurana Gayemagoi	—	—
1990	Pashto	قران مجید سره دَ پښتو ترجمی	—	Online PDF
1990	Polish	Swiety Koran: Tekst Arabskii tlumaczenie Polskie	—	Online version (including short commentary) PDF
1990	Turkish	Kur'an-i Kerim ve Türkçe meali	—	Online PDF
1990	Tuvalu	Te Kulani Tapu	—	Selected verses (PDF)
1991	Bulgarian	Свещеният Коран	—	PDF (selected verses)
1991	Tagalog	Ang Banal Na Koran	—	—
1992	Hausa	Al-Kur'ani Mai Tsarki; Takui Cikin Arabic da Fassara Cikin Hausa	—	—
1996	Norwegian	Den Hellige Qur'ânen: Arabisk texst med Norsk oversettelse	—	PDF
1998	Sundanese	—	—	Selected verses (PDF)
2002	Jula	Kurana Saniman Julakan Na; Ani Arabukan Na	—	—
2002	Kikamba	Kulani Ntheu; Maandiko ma Kialavu na Ualyulo kwa Kikamba	—	Web PDF
2003	Catalan	El Sagrat Alcorà: Amb text Àrab I traducció al Català	—	PDF version
2004	Mauritian Creole	Le Saint Qur'an; Texte Arabe avec traduction en créole	—	Web PDF
2005	Uzbek	Куръони Карим	—	Online Selected verses (PDF)
2006	Mõõré	—	—	Web
2007	Fula	—	—	Selected verses (PDF)
2007	Mandinka	—	—	Selected verses (PDF) Web
2007	Wolof	—	—	Web
2008	Bosnian	Kur'an Časni: Arapski texsti bosanskiprijevod	—	Online version Web
2008	Kyrgyz	—	Чексиз ырайым кылуучу, сурабастан берүүчү (жана) кайра-кайра ырайым кылуучу Алланын аты менен.	Selected verses (online) Web
2008	Malagasy	Ny Kor'any Masina; Amin'ny Teny Arabo sy Ny Dikani Amin'ny Teny Malagasy	—	Web PDF
2008	Thai	—	—	—
2008	Asante Twi	Kur'aan Kronkron No; Arabek Atwerεnsεm ne Asante Nkyerεaseε	—	Online PDF
2010	Kriol (Guinea-Bissau)	Sagradu Al Kur'an k'un Traduson na Kriol	Na Nomi di Allah, Klementi, Miserikordios.	—
2010	Māori	Te Kurānu Tapu	—	PDF Web
2012	Yao	Kulaani Jaambone; Mmavalaango Ga Nchiyao	—	Selected verses (PDF) Web
2015	Burmese	—	—	Selected verses (PDF)
2017	Dogri	क़ुरआन-मजीद दा डोगरी अनुवाद	अ'ऊँ अल्लाह दा नाँऽ लेइयै (पढ़ना) जो बेहद कर्म करने आहला (ते) बार-बार रैहम करने आहला ऐ	PDF
2023	Finnish	Pyhä Koraani	—	Online Web
2023	Hebrew	הַקֻּרְאָן הַמְּפֹאָר	בשם אלוהים הרחמן והרחום.	Full PDF Translation
2024	Latin Spanish	El Sagrado Corán	En el nombre de Al-lah, el Clemente, el Misericordioso.	Full Translation

=== South Asian languages ===
No.	Title	Language	Primary location of language	Year published	Translator(s)	Notes/External links
1		Assamese	Assam, India	1990	Khan Bahadur Ataur Rahman Khan	Online version PDF version
2		Bengali	Bangladesh; Eastern India	1990		Online version PDF version
3	પવિત્ર અલ કુરઆન અલ હકીમ	Gujarati	Gujarat, India	1990		Online version PDF version
4	कुरान मजीढ - के हिन्दी अनुवाद	Hindi	India	1987		Online version
5		Kannada	Southern India	2004	Muhammad Yusuf	PDF version
6		Kashmiri	Kashmir Valley	1998		Online version PDF version
7		Malayalam	Kerala, India	1991		
8		Meitei	Manipur, India	1990	Ahmad Hasan	Online version PDF version
9	मराठी पवित्र क़ुरआन ए हकीम	Marathi	Maharashtra and Goa, India	1992		Online version
10	पवित्र कुरान नेपाली अनुवाद	Nepali	Nepal	2001		Online eversion PDF version
11	ପବିତ୍ର କୋରାନ	Oriya	Odisha, India	1989	Abdul Qadir Khan; Mohammad Anwar-ul Haque	Online version PDF version
12	ਕੁਰਆਨ ਮਜੀਦ ਦਾ ਗੁਰਮੁਖੀ ਅਨੁਵਾਦ Punjabi (Gurmukhi)	Punjab, India	1983		Online version (including short commentary) PDF version	
13	قران مجید سرائیکی ترجمے نال	Saraiki	Bahawalpur South Punjab, Pakistan	1990	Muhammad Sakani Baloch, Rafiq Ahmad Naeem Sakani Baloch	Online version PDF version
14	قران مجید سنڌي ترجمي سان	Sindhi	Sindh, Pakistan; Kutch, India	1991	Abdul Qadir Dahri; Ghous Baksh Shaikh	Online version PDF version
15		Sinhalese	Sri Lanka	2015		Online (first 10 parts)
16		Tamil	Southern India	1989		
17	పవిత్ర ఖురాన్ గ్రంథము	Telugu	Southern India	1991		Online version
18	تفسیر صغیر (Tafseer-e-Sagheer)	Urdu	Pakistan; parts of Northern India	1957	Caliph II	PDF version (includes Commentary)
—	قرآن کریم: اردو ترجمہ	Urdu	—	2000	Caliph IV	PDF version
—	قرآن کریم: ترجمہ	Urdu	—		Mir Ishaq	PDF version

=== Lahore Ahmadiyya Translation ===
Year	Language	Title	Example (1:1)	External links
1934	Dutch	De Heilige Qoer-an	-	PDF
1964	German	Der Koran	—	PDF
1979	Indonesian	Qur'an Suci Terjemah & Tafsir	-	PDF
1986	Spanish	El Sagrado Quran	—	PDF
1990	French	Le Quran Sacre	—	PDF
2001	Javanese	Qur'an Suchi Jarwa Jawi	-	PDF

== Exegesis ==
Title	Title in English	Language	Year published	Author(s)	Translations	Notes/External links
	Commentary on the Holy Quran: Surah Al-Fateha	Urdu		Mirza Ghulam Ahmad	English by Muhammad Zafarullah Khan	Exegesis compiled from the writings of Mirza Ghulam Ahmad, on the first chapter of the Quran. Only the first volume has been translated in English. PDF (English)
حقائق الفرقان (Haqaiq al-furqan)	Inner Verities of the Discriminant	Urdu		Caliph I	None	4 volumes. Link
تفسير کبير(Tafseer-e-Kabeer)	The Extensive Commentary	Urdu		Caliph II	None	10 volumes. Exegesis on all chapters of the Quran excluding chapters 3 to 9.Link
تفسیر صغیر(Tafseer-e-Sagheer)	The Short Commentary	Urdu		Caliph II	None	PDF

== Portions ==
The portions translations are mainly "selected verses", but there are also some translations that just have translated some parts. The selected verses are created for celebrating the centenary of Ahmadiyya Community in 1989.

== See also ==
- List of translations of the Quran
- English translations of the Quran
