= A. George Baker =

American physician

Anthony George Baker
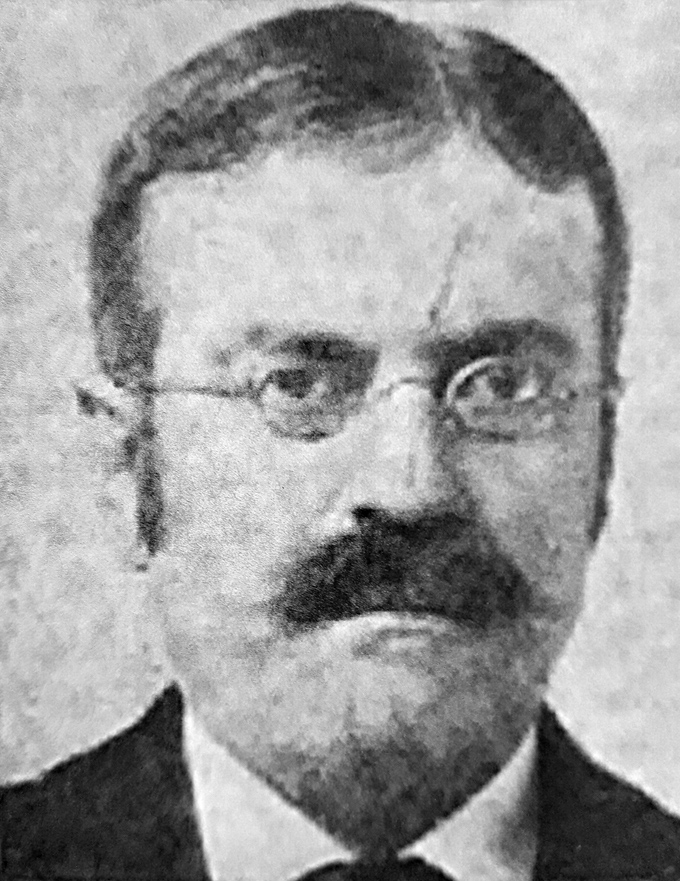
- Born: February 2, 1849; Pennsylvania, United States
- Died: February 17, 1918 (aged 69)
- Known for: translator of The Phonendoscope and its Practical Application (1898); Christian theologian and an early American convert to Islam

Anthony George Baker (February 2, 1849 – February 17, 1918) was an American Protestant clergyman and medical doctor who converted to Islam.

== Background ==
Anthony George Baker was born in Pittsburgh, Pennsylvania, and was the son of German immigrants, Dr Jacob Baker and Mary Catherine Platt. He graduated from the Western University of Pennsylvania with degrees of Bachelor of Arts and Master of Arts in 1869. Thereafter he entered the Western Theological Seminary in Allegheny, Pennsylvania from where he graduated in 1873 with a Bachelor of Divinity and was ordained a minister of the Presbyterian Church. He was assigned in Bardolph, Illinois and later to the only Presbyterian church in Atlantic City, New Jersey.

During his stay in Atlantic City, Baker inclined increasingly towards Episcopalianism and converted to the Episcopalian church, becoming a Deacon and then, in 1879, an ordained priest. He worked both as an assistant rector and rector of several churches in Pennsylvania, including, as assistant to the rectors of St. George's Church, Philadelphia and the Church of The Epiphany. He also founded St. Simeon's Church in Philadelphia.

Alongside his work as a clergyman, Baker studied at the Jefferson Medical College and graduated as a medical doctor in 1887 specialising in pediatrics and practicing both standard and homeopathic medicine. He soon retired abruptly from the ministry to practice medicine, serving in the Pennsylvania Naval Reserves and as a physician at the Chinese Medical Dispensary of Philadelphia where he would become the chief physician. Baker became well known for his translation of The Phonendoscope and its Practical Application (1898) by which the use of the modern stethoscope of the time became more widely acknowledged. His interest in history, languages and eastern religions led him to study various European languages as well as Arabic and Chinese, the cultures and religions of whose native speakers Baker published and presented historical papers on. He also presented papers before the Cooper Literary Institute in Philadelphia and had served for some time as its President.

== Conversion to Islam ==
George Baker's earliest known connection with American Muslim converts was in August 1893 when Alexander Russell Webb, another early American convert to Islam, published a section of a work by Baker concerning the relationship between medieval Christians and Muslims in Jerusalem in his newspaper the Moslem World. According to author Patrick D. Bowen, Baker was in contact with Webb and may have run his Oriental Publishing Company from a Philadelphia post office in 1892 and 1894. He was known for his lectures on Islam in Philadelphia and may also have been secretly associated with a group of about twenty Muslim converts in the city during this period. Baker's Muslim contacts outside the United States included the English convert Abdullah Quilliam and in January 1896 he explicitly identified as a Muslim in a letter to Quilliam's newspaper The Crescent.

Baker also had connections with the Ahmadiyya movement in India through the movement's English-language journal, The Review of Religions, with which Webb had also corresponded. His contact with the movement began in 1904 and was the result of his writings having found their way to India and coming to the attention of Mufti Muhammad Sadiq, a disciple of Mirza Ghulam Ahmad. Baker was among a number of European and American figures with whom Sadiq had established contact during Ghulam Ahmad's lifetime and he was mentioned in the fifth volume of Ghulam Ahmad's Barahin-e-Ahmadiyya (1905; The Muhammadan Proofs). In his first reply to Sadiq's letter dated October 28, 1904, Baker affirmed the Islamic creed, claimed to be a practicing Muslim and endorsed Ghulam Ahmad's work. in subsequent correspondences, he was more direct in his affirmation of Ghulam Ahmad's prophetic role and in his expressions of allegiance to the Ahmadiyya movement and—although he does not appear to have formally initiated into the movement—is therefore counted within it as one of the earliest American Ahmadis. He remained in contact with the movement until his death in 1918 and upon his arrival as a missionary to the United States in 1920, Sadiq posthumously included Baker's name in a list of American converts to Islam.

== Selected bibliography ==
- The History of the Germans in America (1891)
- German-American Christianity and the Protestant Episcopal Church
- History of the Knights of St. John of Malta
- The Phonendoscope and its Practical Application (1898; translator)
- The Flora of Arabia and the Arabian Prophet
- The Revival of Learning
- 'Muhammad the Founder of an Empire, and of a Religion Which Is Still Spreading' (February 1912) in The Review of Religions, 11, (2)
- 'The One God and Islam Is the Religion of All Men' (August 1913) in The Review of Religions, 12, (8)

== See also ==
- Alexander Russell Webb
- George Bethune English
- Abdullah Quilliam
- Ahmadiyya in the United States
- Islam in the United States
- List of former Christians
- List of converts to Islam
