= Al-Sadiq Mosque =

Mosque in Chicago, Illinois, United States

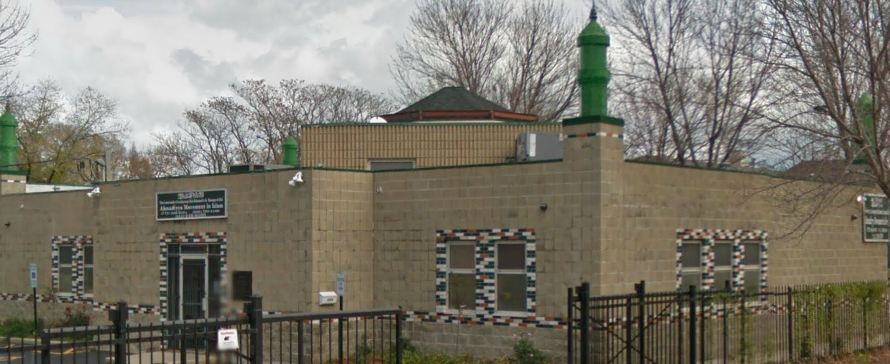

- Location in Illinois

Religion
- Affiliation: Ahmadiya
- Ecclesiastical or organisational status: non-profit religious organization

Location
- Location: 4448 S Wabash Ave, Chicago, Illinois 60653
- Coordinates: 41.8132°N 87.6249°W

Architecture
- Type: Place of worship
- Completed: 1922

Specifications
- Dome: 1
- Minaret: 4

Website
- Official Website

The Al Sadiq Mosque (or Wabash Mosque) was commissioned in 1922 in the Bronzeville neighborhood in city of Chicago. The Al-Sadiq Mosque is one of America's earliest built mosques and the oldest standing mosque in the country today. This mosque was funded with the money predominantly donated by African-American Ahmadi Muslim converts.

== Chicago Muslim Mission ==
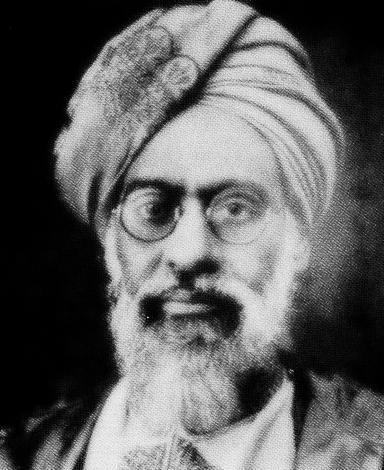
Muhammad Sadiq – First Muslim missionary in the United States

Mufti Muhammad Sadiq arrived in America on February 15, 1920, and established in 1921 the Headquarters of the Ahmadiyya Muslim Community. Muhammad Sadiq started a monthly magazine called The Muslim Sunrise, which contained articles on Islam, contemporary issues of conscience, and the names of new converts. This magazine still exists. Muhammad Sadiq attracted thousands of converts in his short stay in America, most notably in Detroit and Chicago between 1922 and 1923.

The Ahmadiyya Muslim Community continued to grow and established more than 40 missions throughout America. Four Ahmadi mosques can be found in the region today, with demographics that are a mixture of African-American, Indo-Pakistani, White, and Latino. Chicago served as the movement's national headquarters until 1950, when it was moved to the American Fazl Mosque in Washington, D.C. In 1994 the Ahmadiyya Muslim Community's USA headquarters were moved to Masjid Bait ur Rahman in Silver Spring, MD.

== See also ==
- List of mosques in the Americas
- Lists of mosques
- List of mosques in the United States
