= Review of Religions =

English-language monthly magazine

The Review Of Religions - February 2015 Cover (Volume 110, Issue 2)

== Summary ==
The Review of Religions is an English-language comparative religious magazine published monthly by the Ahmadiyya Muslim Community. Regularly in print since 1902, it is one of the longest running Islamic periodicals in English. It has been described as the main publication of the Ahmadiyya movement in the language and as a valuable source material for information on the geographical expansion of Ahmadi activity. The magazine was launched by Mirza Ghulam Ahmad with the aim of conveying an accurate understanding of Islamic teachings across the English-speaking world and dispelling misconceptions held against the faith. The articles, however, typically comprise distinctly Ahmadi perspectives. In addition to the English edition published from London, the magazine currently publishes separate quarterly editions in German, French and Spanish.

== History and impact ==
The Review of Religions was established by Mirza Ghulam Ahmad in 1902 with the express purpose of disseminating Islamic teachings in the English language. The periodical had three main goals: to inspire new Muslim converts in the Western world who may have felt isolated and reinvigorate their efforts in propagating Islam; to convey a clear understanding of Islam to non-Muslim intellectuals; and to counteract Christian missionary proselytism. The idea that the Review should publish more articles of a general nature with those specifically connected to the Ahmadiyya movement being printed in a supplement was abandoned early on at Ghulam Ahmad's behest. The Review targeted Western audiences and focused especially on Christianity. The magazine was printed in Lahore but published from Qadian, Punjab, alongside an Urdu edition.

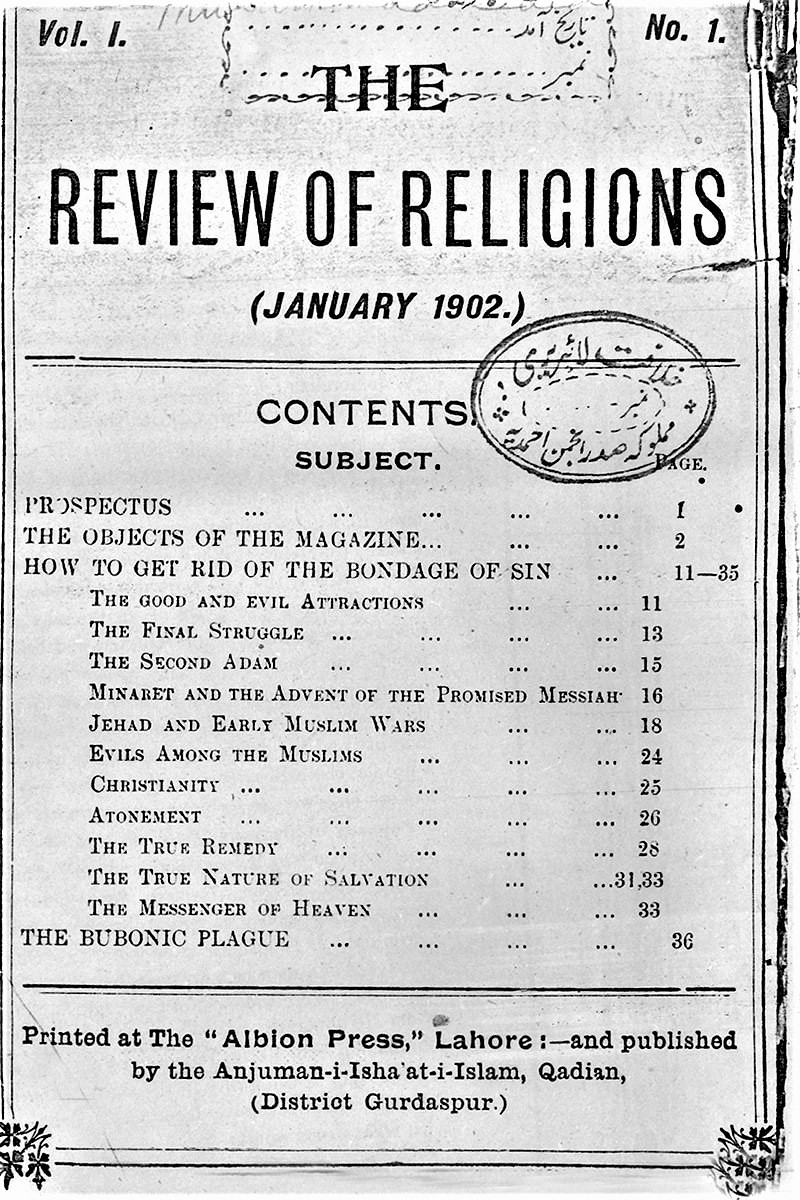
Cover of the first issue of the Review of Religions, January 1902

Early issues featured articles addressing the Islamic teachings on a range of themes that were common targets for Orientalist critics of the faith including polygamy, marriage, divorce, slavery and concubinage; and comprised inter alia a series critiquing various European translations of the Quran and a series in refutation of the theory of Quranic abrogation. In addition, the Review devoted much space to the messianic claim of Ghulam Ahmad and the organisation of the Ahmadiyya movement. In 1902–3, the Review partly serialised Ghulam Ahmad's treatise Jesus in India (1908) which put forward the view that Jesus had survived crucifixion, left Roman jurisdiction and died a natural and honourable death in Kashmir. On the issue of Jihad, which was also extensively covered in early editions, the Review was both the reflection of and the English vehicle for the dissemination of the Ahmadi teaching of jihad "by the pen" in the propagation of Islam. In its critical approach towards Christianity and its doctrines, the Review's style and content led the editor of the Calcutta Review, in April 1902, to suspect that the articles were written by a European. By 1914, the Review had also begun highlighting the racial relations subsisting within Islam, often in the context of the racial discrimination among Christian missionary institutions of the time.

The editors of the Review were successful in accessing mainstream publishing outlets in Britain and the United States and the periodical received the appreciation of both Muslim and non-muslim figures of the early 20th century. Ahmadi sources list a number of international endorsements from prominent Europeans of the period including the Russian writer Leo Tolstoy and the Dutch Orientalist Martijn Theodoor Houtsma. Writing in 1918, Howard Walter, a Protestant minister working in Lahore who was otherwise unsympathetic towards the Ahmadiyya movement, commended the wide range of subjects and the variety of religious groups and currents with which the Review dealt. In the first decade of the 20th century, the Review also served as the most significant means of contact between the early Ahmadiyya movement and converts to Islam in Britain and North America before the arrival of Ahmadi missionaries there. The influential Victorian English convert to Islam, Abdullah Quilliam, who described the Review as a "priceless work" in the defence of Islam, acclaimed the standard of the articles and their effectiveness in answering Christian polemics against Muhammad. He also reprinted an article from it in his own newspaper, The Crescent in 1903 and advertised the Review therein in 1906. Other notable subscribers among Quillam's circle of Muslims who positively received the Review and were in correspondence with its editors included Djaffar Mortimore, Nur-ud-Din Stephen and Yahya Nasser Parkinson. In the United States, Alexander Russell Webb, one of the first converts to Islam in the country who was also in contact with the Ahmadiyya movement, was a regular subscriber and also commented favourably on the Review. Among its American readers was A. George Baker, a contact of Webb and former Protestant clergyman who had converted to Islam and would become one of the earliest Ahmadi Muslims in America. Baker also maintained correspondence with the editors of the Review and contributed articles for it.

Although the articles were initially intended to feature translations of Ghulam Ahmad's lectures, the Review soon extended its range to include the writings of prominent followers as well as lectures and articles by Western converts to Islam. British subscribers who contributed articles to the Review included converts such as the Irish Peer Baron Lord Headley, Yahya Nasser Parkinson and Khalid Sheldrake. Contact between the British Muslim converts and Qadian grew through the Review under the leadership of Hakim Nur-ud-Din the first Ahmadi caliph, as did their literary contributions towards the magazine; something which may have conveyed the urgency of establishing an Islamic mission in Britain for the Ahmadis in India following Quilliam's departure from England.

The Review of Religions also played an instrumental role in establishing the Ahmadiyya movement in different parts of the world including in Mauritius (1915) and Ghana (1921). The Review's editorial office was transferred from Qadian, India to London, England by Mirza Bashir-ud-Din Mahmud, the then caliph of the Ahmadiyya Muslim Community, when he visited the city in 1924 to lay the foundation for the first purpose-built mosque in the British capital. The scope of the magazine has since grown to cover a vast array of topics surrounding theology, science, philosophy, history of religions, international politics and contemporary issues. It is mainly based in London, while a considerable amount of its editors are themselves based in the United States or Canada.

== International editions ==
During Ghulam Ahmad's lifetime, the Review used to be published in both English and Urdu as two separate editions. Since 2011 the magazine is also published in the German language as Die Revue der Religionen., based in Frankfurt am Main. Since 2017, the magazine also has a French edition published as the Revue des Religions based in Paris. The Spanish edition of the Review of Religions was launched from Guatemala in 2018.

== Exhibitions ==
Since 2015, the Review of Religions has been hosting regular thematic exhibitions covering various religious topics including Islamic art, the Turin Shroud and Quranic calligraphy. Many of these exhibitions are of an interactive nature and allow for the active participation of Muslim and non-Muslim guests.

== Early editors ==
- Maulana Muhammad Ali
- Khwaja Kamal-ud-Din
- Mufti Muhammad Sadiq
- Maulwi Muhammad Din
- Mirza Bashir Ahmad
- Maulvi Sher Ali
- Malik Ghulam Farid
- Abdul Rahim Dard
- Maulwi Farzand Ali
- Sufi Abdul Qadeer Niaz

== See also ==
- The Muslim Sunrise
- The Islamic Review
