= Islamic Review =

Islamic magazine in London, the United Kingdom

The Islamic Review (1913–1971) was an Ahmadiyya official magazine, first of the Woking Muslim Mission, and then of AAIIL, California (1980–1989). It was founded in London by Khwaja Kamal-ud-Din. Originally the Muslim India and Islamic Review, the name was changed in 1914 to Islamic Review and Muslim India to reflect broader Islamic concerns, and in 1921 it became simply the Islamic Review. The magazine gained popularity among the English-speaking Muslim social elite in Europe, the US and throughout the British Empire, and in some of the countries it was circulated, its articles were reprinted and quoted in local Muslim newspapers. The paper was distributed free of charge. In June 1950, one of the articles on women poets featured Rabab Al-Kadhimi.

== See also ==
- Review of Religions
- The Muslim Sunrise
