= The Muslim Sunrise =

American monthly Islamic magazine

The Muslim Sunrise (formerly The Moslem Sunrise) is a monthly Islamic magazine published by the Ahmadiyya Muslim Community in the United States of America. Founded in 1921 by Mufti Muhammad Sadiq in Highland Park area of Detroit, Michigan, it is the earliest Muslim publication originating in the United States. It took its name from a saying of the Islamic prophet Muhammad to the effect that in the latter days "the sun shall rise from the west" and serves as a platform for Islamic and interfaith discussion. Its stated purpose is that it "seeks to open discussions on Islam and topics relating to religion in general. It highlights the role of Islam in an ever-changing global society. It provides a platform for public opinion on contemporary issues and presenting their solutions from an Islamic perspective".

== History ==
The first volumes of the magazine featured reports of Sadiq's lecture tours, public debates, and other activities, and published lists of people who had embraced Ahmadi Islam.

== Notable features ==
Being the longest-running Islamic magazine in the United States, it is also an important historical source for the history of Islam in the United States since the early 20th century. The traditional format of the magazine has been a featured passage from the Quran, followed by sayings of Muhammad and excerpts from the writings of Mirza Ghulam Ahmad the founder of the Ahmadiyya movement, believed by its followers to be the expected Mahdi and Messiah; an address by an Ahmadi Imam and a series of scholarly articles typically dealing with theological issues and Islamic practices and morals. It also frequently discusses contemporary issues and events in the Muslim world or within local American Muslim communities. Sadiq, and the American Ahmadiyya Muslim Community utilized The Muslim Sunrise as a tool to defend Islam and the Quran particularly against Christian polemics. Recognizing racial intolerance in early 20th century America, Sadiq also popularized the Islamic quality for inter-racial harmony. According to the religious historian Richard Turner, The Muslim Sunrise was the foremost medium of spreading the Ahmadiyya message across America in the early 20th century, multi-racial missionary work was its primary thrust and it exercised "a profound influence on the signification that black Americans formed for themselves in Islam". Recent editions regularly contain "Friday Sermon" and "poetry corner" sections alongside a new feature on "Religion and Science".

== See also ==
- Review of Religions
- Islamic Review
- Ahmadiyya in the United States
- Islam in the United States
