= Baitus Samee Mosque (Houston) =

Mosque in Houston, Texas, United States

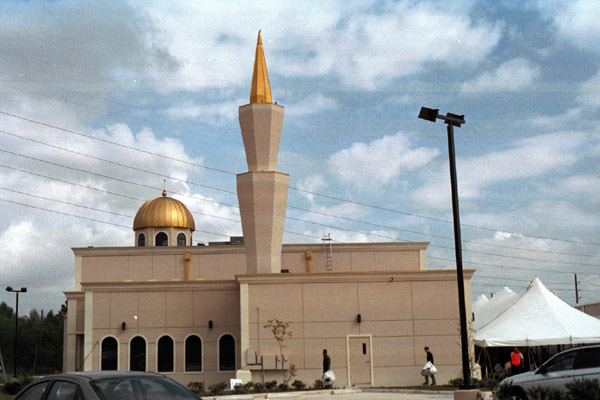

Religion
- Affiliation: Islam
- Branch/tradition: Ahmadiyya

Location
- Location: Houston, Texas, United States
- Interactive map of Baitus Samee Mosque
- Coordinates: 29.964323°N 95.440288°W

Architecture
- Type: Mosque
- Completed: 2004

Specifications
- Capacity: 900
- Dome: 1
- Minaret: 1

Baitus Samee Mosque is a prominent Ahmadi Muslim mosque in Houston, in the U.S. state of Texas. It was developed in stages during 1998 to 2004; its doors opened in 2001 or 2002.

== History ==
It was conceived in the 1980s by Mirza Tahir Ahmad, fourth caliph of the Ahmadiyya faith, as one of five large mosque construction projects to be built in major United States cities, along with ones in Los Angeles, Chicago, and Washington, D.C. It is a leading mosque of Ahmadiyya in the United States.

It is a 6,500 square feet (600 m^{2}) mosque constructed for $1.5 million on a 5.5 acres (2.2 ha) site. Dedicated in March 2004, it has capacity for 1,000 worshippers, and was the result of "nearly 20 years of work by 500 members from Pakistan, Bangladesh, India, Nigeria and other countries", of a group which previously met in a community center. The mosque was built in stages, with its foundation laid in 1998 and with the congregation moving in during 2001. Houston mayor Bill White "thanked the Ahmadis for their part in enriching the community" and proclaimed March 27, 2004 to be "Ahmadiyya Muslim Community Day".

The mosque has been a leader in interfaith dialogue and salient in the news:

- In 2010, it hosted a symposium of "Hindu, Buddhist, Jewish, Sikh, Zoroastrian, Christian and Muslim clergy" to respond to a Florida church's plans to burn the Koran on the anniversary of the September 11, 2001, attacks.
- The mosque led, nationally, in 2013 events of the Ahmadiyya Muslim Community to address the topic of "Islamic innocence", by dialogue at the mosque and by hosting a conference at University of Houston, in response to the 2012 release of the controversial anti-Muslim film, Innocence of Muslims.
- On September 11, 2013, it hosted an interfaith prayer service, as part of its participation in the U.S. Ahmadiyya's annual "Muslims for Life" blood drive campaign in honor of 9/11 victims. The event was to include speakers from Houston Baptist University and from Lutheran, Jewish, Hindu, Jain, Sikh, and Zoroastrian faiths.
- In December 2015, it hosted an interfaith prayer vigil in response to the 2015 San Bernardino attack.
- Early in 2017, the mosque hosted the National Leadership Summit of the Ahmadiyya Muslim Youth Association, which addressed reaching out to other communities.
- In June 2017, in response to scattered rallies nation-wide raising spectres of female genital mutilation and Sharia law, the mosque was one of a number that hosted a counter-rally to call such fears unfounded and to present the idea, instead, that American Muslims in fact support American values and freedoms.
- An interfaith Iftar event was held at the mosque during Ramadan later in 2017.

The mosque was visited by the current, fifth caliph of the world-wide Ahmadiyya community, Mirza Masroor Ahmad, in 2018. The caliph led prayers and delivered his Friday sermon. It was one of only four stops in the United States by the khalifa, before he would continue on to Guatemala. Guests were expected "from all over the Gulf Coast region and around the world" for the event, which was said to be comparable to a visit by the pope or the Dalai Lama.

In 2019, the mosque was twice threatened online to be the site of a violent attack, with the sender citing the Christchurch mosque shootings in New Zealand in March 2019. This led to calls for increased security to be put into place in mosques across Texas. The Harris County Sheriff's Office and the FBI were investigating. This was three weeks after a man threatened to shoot up the mosque after he was asked to leave; the man was arrested.

== See also ==
- List of mosques in the Americas
- Lists of mosques
- List of mosques in the United States
