= Prithee =

Archaic English phrase for "please"

Prithee is an archaic English interjection formed from a corruption of the phrase pray thee ([I] ask you [to]), which was initially an exclamation of contempt used to indicate a subject's triviality. The earliest recorded appearance of the word prithee listed in the Oxford English Dictionary is from 1577, while it is most commonly found in works from the seventeenth century. The contraction is a form of indirect request that has disappeared from the language.

Prithee is the most widely known example of second person object enclitics. Linguists consider it to have been the final step in the grammaticalisation of the verb pray. The eventual use of prithee outside the thee/thou usage signalled its transition into a discourse particle.

There has been extensive scholarship investigating the difference in usage of prithee as opposed to pray you, both in terms of politeness and grammaticalisation. Because prithee eventually came to be used in the same context with the word you, it is considered to have developed into a monomorpheme. Prithee was almost always used as a parenthesis in order to introduce indirect questions and requests.

u often coincide in Early Modern English texts, and the difference between the two terms has been debated by scholars. Scholars such as Roger Brown and Albert Gilman have suggested that prithee was an ingroup indicator. Other scholars suggest that it is simply the more deferential form. The relationship between the two is complicated by the phrase beseech you, which was used in the same time period and was clearly the form used most deferentially.

Although the closest Modern English equivalent of prithee is please, or "could", the two terms presume different attitudes within the addressee. While please accompanies a request addressing itself to the positive desire of the addressee, as in "if it please you," prithee accompanies a request which addresses itself to the threat of being answered in the negative, as though the request were against the addressee's wishes. Stated otherwise, the word please suggests that the person being addressed is willing to comply with the request, whereas the word prithee suggests that he or she is not willing. This switch from stating the speaker's contrary desire to stating the speaker's wish not to impose signaled a cultural shift in the English-speaking world in which politeness became stated negatively rather than positively. Wider repercussions are observable in the replacement of such phrases as "excuse me" and "pardon me," which request understanding or forgiveness, with "I am sorry," which instead acknowledges the speaker's remorse.

In the Complete Works of Shakespeare, prithee occurs 228 times while pray thee occurs only 92 times.
