= Rabab Al-Kadhimi =

Iraqi physician and poet

- رباب الكاظمي
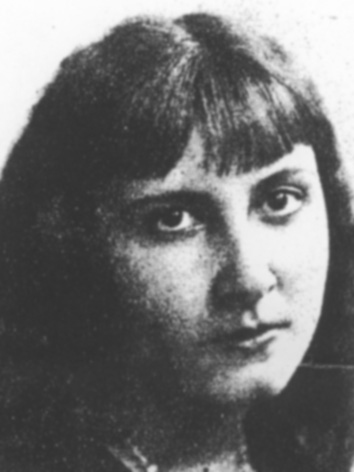
- Born: August 23, 1918; Cairo, Sultanate of Egypt
- Died: 1998 (aged 79–80)
- Occupations: Dental surgeon; poet
- Known for: Pioneering Iraqi poet
- Father: Abd al-Muhsin al-Kadhimi

Rabab Al-Kadhimi (Arabic: رباب الكاظمي, romanized: Rabāb al-Kāẓimī, also Rabab Al-Kazimi; 30 July 1918 – 1998) was an Iraqi feminist poet and dental surgeon, who is considered a pioneer of women's poetry.

== Early life and career ==
Rabab al-Kadhimi was born in Cairo on 23 August 1918. Her father was the Iraqi poet Abd al-Muhsin al-Kadhimi. Her Tunisian mother, Aisha, died when she was ten years old. Her father encouraged her interest in poetry and she published widely in Egyptian periodicals in the 1920s and 1930s. Some of these writings were so political that both she and her father were threatened with deportation by the Egyptian authorities. Her father died when she was eighteen years old and she was subsequently invited to visit Iraq and attend a memorial ceremony dedicated to his life and works. Her subsequent education the Princess Fawzia School in Egypt in 1936, funded by the Iraqi Ministry of Education.

On Al-Kadhimi's return to Egypt she married Hikmat Chadirji and had a son. However in 1950 she returned to education to study dentistry. She spent time at Georgetown University Hospital in Washington, specialising in paediatric dentistry. The couple then returned to Iraq so that Chadirji could take up a post in the Iraqi Ministry of Foreign Affairs. Al-Kadhimi continued to work and by 1956 was the Head of Dentistry for a hospital in Baghdad. The couple returned to Egypt and for several years Al-Kadhimi used her medical training to treat the wounded of the Algerian Revolution. She died in 1998.

== Legacy ==
In literature, al-Kadhimi is considered a pioneer of Iraqi women's poetry. The first works to be collated and sold by al-Kadhimi were published in 1969. However she had already been featured on 'Contemporary Poetesses of Iraq' in the Islamic Review in 1950. She is also viewed as a feminist writer, using her work to draw attention to women's issues.

Highlighting her lack of recognition as a woman, she wrote:

"My act of writing is my wound
And my crime is my knowledge"
