= Commentary on the Holy Quran: Surah Al-Fateha =

Commentary on The Holy Quran: Surah al-Fateha
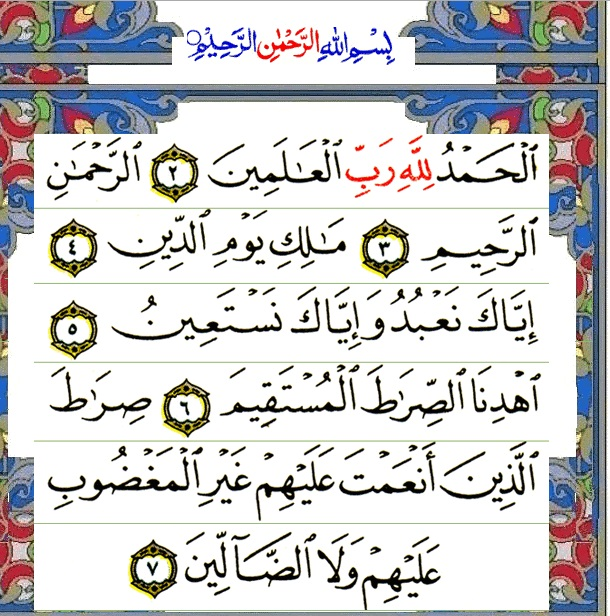
- Author: Mirza Ghulam Ahmad
- Translator: Muhammad Zafrulla Khan
- Genre: Tafsir
- Publisher: Islam International Publications Ltd
- Pages: 395
- ISBN: 1853727830
- Website: Commentary on The Holy Quran: Surah Fatiha at Google Books

The Commentary on The Holy Quran: Surah Fatiha is an exegesis of Surah al-Fatiha, the first chapter of the Quran. It was compiled from the writings and Pronouncements of Mirza Ghulam Ahmad, the founder of the Ahmadiyya movement. It has been translated into English by Sir Muhammad Zafrulla Khan.

== Introduction ==
This Surah has been described as the "Prologue of the Holy Quran". It has been called the Quran in brief, a "veritable treasure-house of wisdom and philosophy" (Commentary, page 1) Mirza Ghulam Ahmad, claims the Al-Fateha has been mentioned in the ancient Revelations.

"He said: I saw a mighty angel descend from heaven. In his hand was the Fatiha in the shape of a little book and by the command of the Almighty Lord his right foot came to rest on the ocean and his left foot on the earth and he called in a loud voice like the roaring of a lion. Seven thunder-claps issued forth from his mouth and from each was heard a pronouncement and it was commanded: Seal up the words announced by the thunder-claps and inscribe them not. Thus said the Loving Lord. The descending angel swore by the Ever-Living One Whose light has illumined the face of the seas and the habitations, that there will not dawn an age greater in glory than that age." (Commentary, page 2)

Ahmad claims the Revelation 10:1-4 (New Testament) refers to the same Book Open called Al-Fateha, a proof of his own claims to have fulfilled the Second Coming, being the Messiah.(Commentary, page 2)

Ahmad describes the Al-Fateha as "It is a perfect whole, complete and flawless. With all its overpowering charm and beauty the Fateha is charged with truth and wisdom. Every phrase proclaims and induces righteousness. There is not the least suspicion of falsehood or a single false note. There is not the least redundance. Yet nothing has been left out. There is no exaggeration nor any understatement. The beauty of form is complete and perfect, as in the rose, but in a far higher degree. Internal qualities of Fateha are healing for mind and spirit..." (Commentary, page 7)

== Al-Fatihah ==
Surah Fatihah is said to be an epitome of the Holy Quran and is called the Mother of the Book. "In it are comprehended, within a brief compass, all the verities and wisdom of the Holy Quran". The Sura has seven verses, including the 'Bismillah'. The complete Sura is:

[Transliteration].

1.Bismillāhi r-raḥmāni r-raḥīm
2.Al ḥamdu lillāhi rabbi l-’ālamīn
3.Ar raḥmāni r-raḥīm
4.Māliki yawmi d-dīn
5.Iyyāka na’budu wa iyyāka nasta’īn
6.Ihdinā ṣ-ṣirāṭ al-mustaqīm
7.Ṣirāṭ al-laḏīna an’amta ‘alayhim ġayril maġḍūbi ‘alayhim walāḍ ḍāllīn

Mirza Ghulam Ahmad gives a rather free translation of the above seven verses in the following words:

In the name of Allah, Most Gracious, Ever Merciful. God whose name is Allah is worthy of every kind of praise and all praise pertains only to His glory, for, He is the Creator-Sustainer of all the worlds: He is the Gracious; He is the Merciful and He is Master of the Day of Requital. (O Lord of perfect attributes) we worship Thee alone and seek help from Thee alone. Guide us along the straight path, the path of those who enjoy thy favour and save us from the ways of those who were afflicted in this world with Thy wrath, in the shape of plagues and other torments and save us also from the ways of those who though they have not suffered torment in this world but have strayed far away from the path of salvation and shall thus be afflicted with torment in the hereafter. (Ayyamas Solh, p. 18).[Commentary, page 27]

== Verse 1 ==
Ahmad explains, the verse points towards the inherent weaknesses of man, helpless and ignorant and in need of resorting to his Creator every moment; God the Mighty, Self-Existing Being Who comprises all perfect attributes, and is free from every weakness and defect. The verse mentions the Substantive Name ALLAH and His two supreme attributes, Ahmad writes:

"Allah is the Being, Imperceptible, Above the reach of reason, Beyond of beyond, Finer than the finest towards Whom every thing turns in true worship, which is extinction in love, that is apparent extinction, or in true extinction, which is death." (Tuhfa Golarviyya, p. 103). (Commentary, page 58)

=== The Beneficent, The Merciful ===
The first verse, mentions two very important Attributes of God. "Rahman is One Who bestows not as a reward, nor in return for any service". Rahmaniyyat and Rahimiyyat. The former indicates the pure Divine grace and beneficence, without any reference to human efforts and deeds. The Grace of God that precedes any human endeavours and demands, having no connection to human virtue or evils. The second Attribute of God, mentioned in the Bismillah is Rahimiyyat. The grammatical structure of the two attributes differs. Rahimiyyat points towards the fact that man may take full advantage of the blessings and benefits of the Divine Grace through his own acts and deeds. "The more a person discards inner and outer indifference and disinclination, and the deeper he grows in sincerity and righteousness and the closer he approaches obedience through effort and application, the heavier is the impact of the Divine Word on his heart and in like proportion does he derive benefit from its lights and cultivates in himself the characteristics of those who are acceptable to God." (Commentary, page 32) Ahmad explains that these two attributes, Rahmaniyyat and Rahimiyyat are indispensable for a successful prosecution of all temporal as well as spiritual undertakings for the consummation of all projects in the world. Hence is the general instruction to initiate all projects, small or large, by first reciting the Bismillah.

=== Supplications and Prayers ===
Ahmad, emphasizing the importance of the verse Bismillah... writes:

"The Lord of All-Wisdom has ordained from the beginning that prayer and supplication should play a great role in the achievement of success in any endeavour. Divine grace most certainly helps resolve the difficulties of those who supplicate Him in perfect faith and utter sincerity...inaugurating every enterprise with a prayer for help from the Source of every grace, the Rahman and the Rahim, is the way of extreme reverence, submission, self negation and utter dependence, which is the first step in the direction of realisation of Divine Unity in human conduct. By strict adherence to it a person acquires childlike humility and is washed clean of every trace of the arrogance with which the minds of the haughty worldlings are filled." (Commentary page 33-35)

== Verse 2 ==
"Praise be to Allah, the Cherisher and Sustainer of the worlds"; Alhamdu lillahe has been explained that "every type of praise, whether relating to external aspects or internal realities, whether relating to inherent excellences or as manifested in natural phenomena, is due exclusively to Allah. No other shares in it...He is Perfect in His Being, in His attributes and qualities, in every respect and is totally free from every defect and shortcoming". (Baraheen Ahmadiyyah, Vol. IV, pp. 364–365, Footnote 11). (Commentary, page 71). The author explains, this belief, in itself, refutes all claims of false deities.

Al-Hamd literally signifies all Praise. The verse implies, all praise is due to God, because of His Infinite Graciousness (Rahmaniyyat) and Mercy (Raheemiyyat), evidenced by His being the Rabb-al-Aalameen, providing and sustaining all the Worlds.

=== Incessant Providence ===
The author explains that God's Providence and Grace is a continuous process, hence the verse rabbi l-’ālamīn (Sustainer of the Worlds). He writes:

"The Lord of the Universe (rabbi l-’ālamīn) showers His Providential grace incessantly on the entire universe, without a single moment's interruption. Even after the creation of the universe that Source of beneficence is as indispensable as He was before anything had come into being and the world is as much dependent on His Providence for its survival and support as it was for its coming into being and its taking shape. It is He who takes care of the universe every moment and every particle of it is alive and fresh because of Him." (Commentary, page 141).

== Verse 3 ==
The author has related the two major attributes of God, the alrrahman and alrrahim to have found manifestation in the attributes of Muhammad. Being Muhammad and Ahmad. "Muhammad " is the One most Praised (a manifestation of alrrahman) and " Ahmad " is the one completely lost in the praise of God (a manifestation of alrrahim).

"These two are the quintessence and the core of the reality of all His attributive names. Indeed they are yardsticks for the spiritual evolution of a seeker who strives after perfection through becoming a manifestation of Divine attributes. No one has been granted a complete measure of these two except our Holy Prophet, the culmination of the Prophetic dispensation. He has been given two names by the grace of the Lord of the heavens and the earth parallel to these two attributes, the first being Muhammad and the second Ahmad. The name Muhammad thus donned the cloak of the attribute Rahman, manifesting himself in the raiment of glory and belovedness and has been praised exceedingly for his benefaction and beneficence. The name Ahmad appeared in the robe of the attribute Rahim and the role of lover and beauty by Allah's grace Who protects the believers with His support and help. Thus the two names of our Holy Prophet (on whom be the peace and blessings of Allah) are reflections of the two attributes of our Bounteous Lord, reflected in two mirrors facing one another....He made the Promised Messiah manifestation of the attribute Ahmad, investing him with the grace and beauty of Rahimiyyat and put in his heart compassion and tenderness, adorning him with excellent moral qualities....These two names, Muhammad and Ahmad, are reflections of Rahman and Rahim." (Commentary, pages 47-50)

== Verse 4 ==
The author explains that the word Mālik means Master, it negatives all rights in the subject, in its fullest sense, the word applies only to God. He alone is the complete Master. A Master (Mālik) is not a mere magistrate or judge. God has named Himself Mālik (Master) in verse Māliki yawmi d-dīn meaning, He has full authority to dispense reward and punishment. "It is obvious that no one can be truly called Master (Mālik) unless he has the power to punish or pardon as he may determine" (Chashmae Maarifat, p. 16).(Commentary, page 101). He claims this world is a realm of trial. "For its consequences and recompense there is another realm. He has promised happiness in the hereafter in recompense for the hardships endured in this world. If someone questions His dispensation, the answer is that He possesses dominion and mastery. He does as He wills. There is no room for anyone to find fault with that which He does (Al-Hakam, May 31, 1908. (Commentary, page 102).

=== Safeguard against Sin ===
The author claims the awe of Divine Majesty can safeguard against sin. Once one realises that God is Māliki yawmi d-dīn (Dispenser of reward and punishment) and that His punishment is most severe, "that awesome consciousness would become a barrier against sin". (Al-Hakam, Dec. 10, 1901). (Commentary, page 102).

=== In this Life also ===
The author of this commentary believes that God being the Māliki yawmi d-dīn (Master of the Day of Judgment) does not signify that reward and punishment will be awarded only in the hereafter. The Quran makes it clear that the Day of Judgement is the Day of the Greatest Dispensation, however, "there is a continuous judgement in this life also. Consider the verse: He will grant you a distinction (Quran 8:31)...Requital starts in this very life." (Kishti Nooh p. 39) (Commentary, page 102).

=== The Day of Judgement ===
Ahmad claims in his Commentary that this Life is totally dependent upon an infinite chain of causes and the Divine Decrees are hidden under the thick system of Causes and Effects but the Day of Judgement is entirely different, he writes:

"the Divine attribute of Providence will manifest itself independently of the normal media and it will be seen and felt that nothing counts except the overpowering dominion and perfect sovereignty of the Exalted Lord. All comfort and joy and requital and reward will be seen as emanating directly from God, with no screen or barrier in between, nor will there be left any room for any doubt... on that day every comfort and torment and pleasure and pain that mankind will experience shall proceed directly from the Divine Being and He will be in truth and in fact the sole Lord of Dispensation; that is to say nearness to Him or distance from Him will determine eternal happiness or everlasting misfortune, in the sense that on those who had believed in Him and had held fast to Divine Unity and had dyed their hearts with His pure love, the light of the mercy of that Perfect Being will descend clearly and manifestly, and those who did not have faith and did not experience Divine love, will be denied this joy and comfort and shall be in painful torment." (Commentary page 110)

=== Refutation of Deism ===
The author believes in a 'Personal' God, Who is not merely the Prime Cause, as some people believe. He is the deliberate Provider and Nourisher in the world. He writes, "The words of the Most High, Al-Hamdu lillahe Rabbilaalameen Al-Rahmanir-Rahim-Malike Yaumiddeen comprise an excellent refutation of atheists, deviationists and nature-worshippers who do not believe in the attributes of Allah, the Lord of Honour, and allege that He is merely the prime cause and has no determining will and is not possessed of volition like Bestower of gifts and bounties." (Commentary page 139).

== Verse 5 ==
This verse literally means: 'Thee alone do we worship, and Thee alone do we implore for help.' This is the fifth verse of the Surah. The author of the Commentary, giving a descriptive translation writes:

"The (verse) Iyyāka na’budu wa iyyāka nasta’īn means: O Thou Lord of perfect attributes and source of the four graces, we worship Thee alone and in the due performance of duty of worship and in other calls and needs we seek only Thy help. Thou art our only God and in order to reach Thee we choose no other deity as our medium, neither man nor idol, nor do we rely on our wisdom or our knowledge; in everything we implore Thee, the Absolute Almighty, for help."(Commentary, page 188).

=== Laws of Nature are Laws of God ===
Ahmad claims, the verse tells us about real worship. It is obeying all the known laws of nature, which are necessary to achieve an objective. Prayer is one of the means (and the one that at times gives birth to other necessary means), hence no prayer is complete without fully resorting to the use of all available means and human faculties, before submitting one's petition to God. He writes, "God brings a desired change through a change in the means... and prayer is in itself a means" (Commentary, page 191).

=== Confession and acknowledgement of weaknesses ===
The verse teaches about human weaknesses and frailties and man's incessant need to seek Divine help and support in every one of his pursuits, worldly or Other-Worldly.
