= The Holy Quran: Arabic Text and English translation =

1955 English translation of the Quran

The Holy Quran: Arabic Text and English translation (completed 1936, published 1955) is a parallel text edition of the Quran compiled and translated by Maulvi Sher Ali, and footnotes to, some of the verses, by Mirza Tahir Ahmad, the fourth successor of Mirza Ghulam Ahmad. Since its first publication in 1955 in the Netherlands, many editions have appeared in different countries. In 1997, an appendix was added at the end.

An ex-evangelist, Clay Chip Smith, has reviewed the translation as, "clear and worded satisfactorily". The Islamic Studies department of the University of Georgia (US) has included the translation in its "Islamic Resources" webpage . A large Indian monthly from Bangalore, the Islamic Voice, has cited it in its comparison to other contemporary translations of the Quran. The translation, as an Ahmadiyya Movement contribution has been mentioned by the multi-disciplinary study, The Black Studies Reader.
