= Alexander Russell Webb =

American journalist

Mohammad Alexander Russell Webb
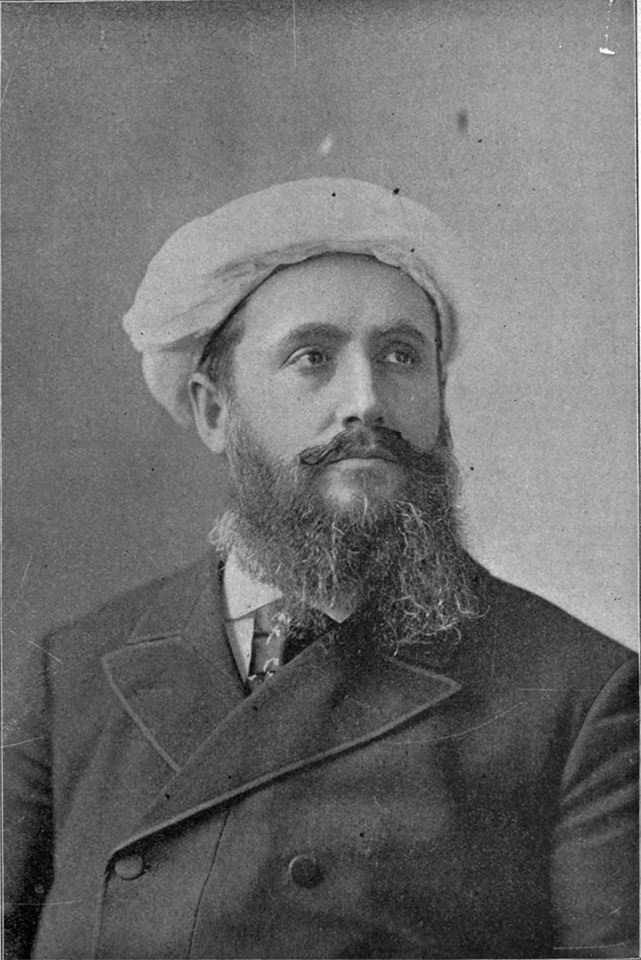
- Born: Alexander Russell Webb; November 9, 1846; Massachusetts, United States
- Died: October 1, 1916 (aged 69); Rutherford, New Jersey or Hudson, New York
- Known for: U.S. consul to the Philippines and an early American convert to Islam. Representing Islam at the Parliament of the World's Religions.

Mohammad Alexander Russell Webb (born Alexander Russell Webb; November 9, 1846 – October 1, 1916) was an American writer, publisher, and the United States Consul to the Philippines. He converted to Islam in 1889, and is considered by historians to be the earliest prominent Old Stock American Muslim convert. In 1893, he was the sole person representing Islam at the first Parliament of the World's Religions.

== Early life ==
His father, Alexander Nelson Webb, was a leading journalist of his time and may have influenced his son's later journalistic exploits.

Webb received his early education at the Home School in Glendale, Massachusetts and later attended Claverack College, an advanced high school near Hudson, New York. He became editor of the Unionville Republican, Unionville, Missouri. His prowess as a journalist was soon apparent, and he was offered the city editorship of the St. Joseph Gazette in St. Joseph, Missouri. Next he became associate editor of the Missouri Morning Journal. Later he became the Assistant City Editor of the Missouri Republican in St. Louis, Missouri.

While working for the Missouri Republican, he was appointed (in September, 1887) by President Cleveland to be Consular Representative to the Philippines at the U.S. office at Manila. According to the editor of his book The Three Lectures, he had given up any concept of religion at least fifteen years before that point.

== Conversion to Islam ==
In 1886 Webb was introduced to Islam by the works of Mirza Ghulam Ahmad of Qadian, India, the founder of the Ahmadiyya movement. Webb wrote two letters to Ghulam Ahmad. Webb's first clear step toward Islam was expressed in these correspondences. These letters were published then in Ghulam Ahmad's book Shahne-e-Haqq page 372 and 439. At that time Webb had yet to meet a Muslim but was put in contact with several Muslims in India by a local Parsi businessman. A newspaper publisher, Budruddin Abdulla Kur of Bombay, published several of Webb's letters in his paper. A local businessman, Hajee Abdulla Arab, a follower of Ghulam Ahmad, saw these letters and travelled to Manila to see Webb. In 1888, he formally declared himself to be a Muslim. Webb later acknowledged Ghulam Ahmad as "a man of God" and the one who had guided him to Islam. While Webb kept in contact with Ahmadis until his death in 1916, the Ahmadiyya literature does not record whether Webb was an Ahmadi Muslim, nor does his work show allegiance towards Ahmadiyya eschatology.

Although Webb encountered some hostility because of his beliefs, the American press that reported on his activities did not question his patriotism, but dubbed him instead "the Yankee Mohammedan".

== Travels in the Muslim world ==
After the visit, Webb began plans to tour India and then return to the U.S. to propagate Islam. Webb's wife, Ella G. Webb, and their three children had also converted to Islam by this time. Hajee Abdulla returned to India and raised funds for Webb's tour. Webb visited Poona, Bombay, Calcutta, Hyderabad, and Madras and gave speeches in each town. In India, he repeatedly expressed his dislike of Westernization and its effect on colonized Muslims. He viewed Muslims who were blindly imitating the West, adopting its style of clothing, and abandoning their own as servile and unworthy of their rich heritage. He saw them as far removed from a genuine Islamic ethos, stating: "The only Mohammedans in all the East who drink intoxicating beverages are those who have been educated in England and wear European clothes. Their contact with Christian nations has demoralized them, and they have drifted away from their religion."

In 1892 he travelled to Egypt and Turkey where he could continue studying Islam. While in Istanbul in 1893, he resigned his post with the State Department and returned to America.

== Life and work in New York City ==
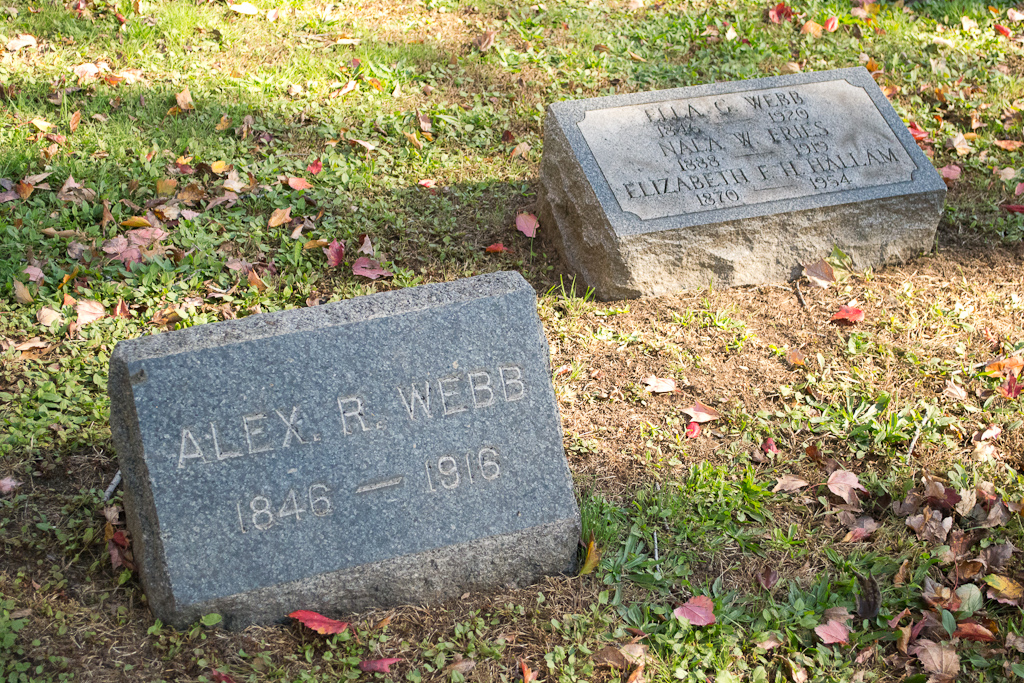
Gravestone of Alexander Russel Webb in Hillside Cemetery, Lyndhurst NJ

Settling in New York, he established the Oriental Publishing Company at 1122 Upper Broadway. This company published his writings, including his magnum opus Islam in America, which comprised eight chapters:

1. Why I Became a Mussulman
2. An Outline of Islamic Faith
3. The Five Pillars of Practice
4. Islam in Its Philosophic Aspect
5. Polygamy and the Purdah
6. Popular Errors Refuted
7. The Muslim Defensive Wars
8. The American Islamic Propaganda

Along with this venture he started the organ of the American Muslim Propagation Movement called The Moslem World. The first issue appeared on May 12, 1893, and was dedicated to the "interests of the American Islamic Propaganda" and "to spread the light of Islam in America", as noted in the subheadings of the May through September issues. Webb had felt it was important to create a tangible source of learning to introduce Islam to the American world. His main goal through this journal was to help establish a Muslim presence in New York City, that would be aimed at dismantling misconceptions regarding Islam, and bring forth the ideas that were relevant to everyday Americans.

The different issues spanned on topics of Islamic doctrines, religious poetry, political issues regarding Muslims, frequently asked questions about the Quran and prayers submitted by locals, and general think-pieces about Islam from various authors. The publication would also reprint articles from various American newspapers, countering Christian press that would misconstrue Islam. The journal's frequent comparisons on Christianity and Islam, helped bring forth people across the country to learn more about Islam as well as serve as inspiration to revert.

This journal is noted be significant in shaping some of the earliest Islamic discourse in New York City, as well as serving an international purpose. Webb had felt it was necessary to establish a relationship between Americans and Indian Muslims, who in large had been funding his mission. Many of the articles in the journal were reprinted and summarized editions of pieces written by Indian Muslim Scholars such as Moulvi Cheragh Ali or Sir Sayed Ahmad Khan. This not only created a cultural exchange of ideas across the globe, but also built credibility for Webb as a truly involved and knowledgeable Muslim advocate, as many initially questioned whether or not a revert with no formal Islamic scholarly education, could accurately speak on topics of Islam. The inclusion of Indian writers did not stop there. Muslim writers from Turkey, Egypt, Britain, also contributed to the journal through reprints, helping bring new and culturally nuanced topics and perspectives about Islam to a largely Protestant America. The journal included translated excerpts from Islamic texts in Arabic, Hindi, Persian, Gujarati, and Urdu, as Webb wanted all kinds of resources and ideas about Islam to be accessible to Americans.

Unfortunately, this journal only lasted seven months, officially ceasing publications after seven monthly issues, in November 1893. While Webb was receiving funding from Indian Muslim donors, majority of the costs for print and publishing relied on the subscriber fees from New York City residents, as the journal was based in Manhattan. The New York City Muslim community in the 1890s was still quite small, and could not generate enough in sales, nor was the financial assistance enough. With the increasing financial pressures, as well as Webb's focus on various other endeavors such as the World Parliament of Religions in Chicago, it no longer was financially viable to keep the journal running.

Although it had a short run, the journal became one of the first attempts at creating an Islamic press that highlighted Islam differently than the orientalist and missionary based accounts often found in New York City at the time.

Webb was the main representative of Islam at the 1893 World Parliament of Religions in Chicago. On September 20 and 21, 1893, he gave two speeches. His speeches were entitled: The Influence of Social Condition and The Spirit of Islam and were published in the large two volume proceedings of the Parliament called The First World's Parliament of Religions (1894).

"I have faith in the American intellect, in the American intelligence, and in the American love of fair play, and will defy any intelligent man to understand Islam and not love it."

— Alexander Russell Webb in the World Parliament of Religions in Chicago speech

For the remainder of his life, he was the main spokesman for Islam in America. Many of America's most prominent thinkers heard him speak on the Islamic Faith, including Mark Twain.

On Broadway, in Manhattan, he founded a short-lived masjid (mosque). The reasons for the termination of this masjid are unknown, but may have been due to a lack of financial support from India. Throughout the rest of America he started study circles in Chicago, Washington, D.C., Newark, Manhattan, Kansas City, Philadelphia, Pittsburgh, and Cleveland. They were named Mecca Study Circle No. I (NYC), Koran Study Circle, Capital Study Circle No. 4, etc. Each using an Islamic city or reference in its title. It is likely they studied Webb's works and those he suggested. The last meeting was in 1943 in Manhattan and was attended by his daughter Aliyyah.

== Later life ==
He is also known for his work as writer. He wrote two booklets about the Armenian genocide from a Muslim point of view: The Armenian Troubles and Where the Responsibility Lies and A Few Facts About Turkey Under the Rule of Abdul Hamid II. He was appointed the Honorary Turkish Consul in New York by Sultan Abdul Hamid II. Webb showed his plans for a Muslim cemetery and masjid and the sultan complimented him on them, though those plans never materialized.

From 1898 till his death on October 1, 1916, aged 69, he lived in Rutherford, New Jersey. There he owned and edited the Rutherford Times. He was buried in Hillside Cemetery, Lyndhurst, on the outskirts of Rutherford.

== See also ==
- A. George Baker
- Abdullah Quilliam

== Sources ==
1. Melton, J. Gordon, Biographical Dictionary of American Cult and Sect Leaders (Garland Publishing Company, Inc., New York & London, 1986), pp. 303–304.
2. Tunison, Emory H., “Mohammed Webb, First American Muslim”, The Arab World, Vol. 1, No. 3, pp. 13–18.
3. Webb, Mohammed A.R., Islam in America (Oriental Publishing Company, New York, 1893), pp. 5–6.
4. Webb, Mohammed A.R., The Three Lectures (Madras, India, 1892), pp. 3–5.
5. Webb, Mohammed A.R. and Brent D. Singleton (ed.), Yankee Muslim: The Asian Travels of Mohammed Alexander Russell Webb. Wildside Press, 2007. This work consists of Webb's travel journals and lectures in Asia (mainly India during the Fall of 1892) and includes an extensive biographical introduction and supplemental appendices.
6. Singleton, Brent D., "Minarets in Dixie: Proposals to Introduce Islam in the American South," (December 2006) Journal of Muslim Minority Affairs, vol. 26 issue 3, pp. 433–444. Details Webb's attempt to colonize parts of Florida, Georgia, and Alabama with Indian Muslims. As well, it discusses a northern editor's call to convert African-Americans in the south to Islam.
7. Singleton, Brent D., "The Moslem World: A History of America's Earliest Islamic Newspaper and Its Successors," (August 2007) Journal of Muslim Minority Affairs, vol. 27 issue 2, pp. 297–307. Examines Webb's newspaper, The Moslem World, and its offshoots and presents a brief overview of a rival publication, The American Moslem.
8. Singleton, Brent D., "Brothers at Odds: Rival Islamic Movements in Late Nineteenth Century New York City," (December 2007) Journal of Muslim Minority Affairs, vol. 27 issue 3, pp. 473–486. Explores Mohammed Webb's American Islamic Propaganda movement and relations with its splinter groups the First Society for the Study of Islam in America and the American Moslem Institute.
9. Mohammed Alexander Russell Webb, Islam in America, and the American Islamic Propagation Movement" by Muhammed Abdullah al-Ahari from the introduction of his reprint of Webb's Islam in America available through SoundVision.
