= Maulvi Sher Ali =

Ahmadi Islamic scholar (1875–1947)

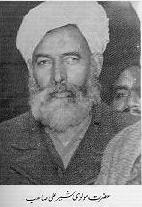
- Born: 24 November 1875
- Died: 13 November 1947 (aged 71)
- Occupation: Muslim scholar

Philosophical work
- School: Ahmadiyya
- Main interests: Quran

Maulvi Sher Ali Ranjha (24 November 1875 – 13 November 1947) was a prominent Ahmadi scholar and a companion of Mirza Ghulam Ahmad.

== Early life ==
Sher Ali was born to a well off and educated Zamindar family that was part of the Ranjha Jat tribe and was from the village Adhrama. He was the son of Maulvi Nizam ud Din. His mother died on 7 March 1907. A daughter of Sher Ali, with the name Khadija Begum wrote his short biography Seerat Hadrat Maulvi Sher Ali. Sher Ali did his B.A. in 1897.

== Works ==
When he heard of Mirza Ghulam Ahmad's claim he travelled to Qadian and gave his Bay'ah (Oath of Allegiance) at the hands of Ghulam Ahmad. He remained headmaster of the Talim-ul-Islam High School in Qadian. He spent his whole life in the service of the cause of Ahmadiyyah. He accompanied Mirza Basheer-ud-Din Mahmood Ahmad, the second khalifa of the Ahmadiyyah sect on his journey to Europe in 1924, and participated in the Wembley’s Conference of Living Religions 1924. He was a profound scholar of religious sciences and the Arabic language. In the central Organization of the Community, Maulvi Sher Ali served as director of publications (Nazir Taleef) at Qadian. He translated the Quran into English. He also published an exposition and rebuttal of the book Yana bi'ul Islam in his Review of Religions.

== Death ==
His wife died on 12 July 1942 and Sher Ali died on 13 November 1947 at Lahore. He was buried at the Bahishti Maqbara (The Heavenly Graveyard) at Rabwah.
