= Mufti Muhammad Sadiq =

Ahmadi Muslim missionary

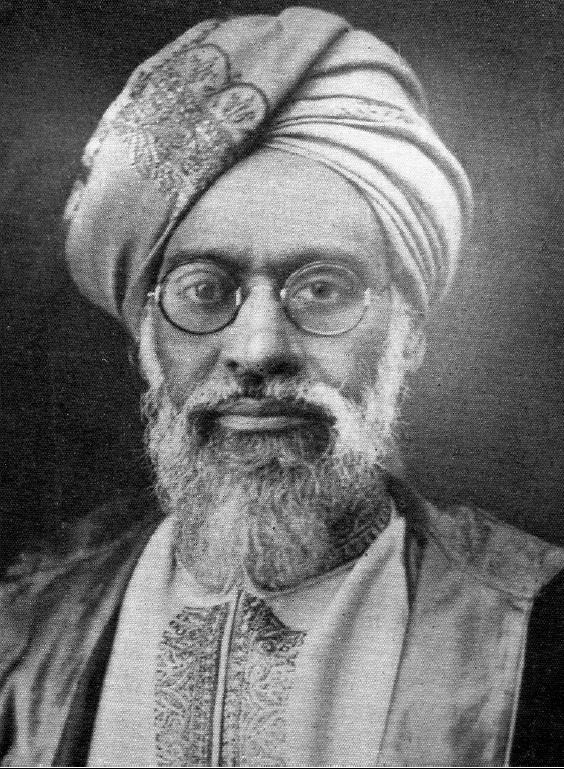

Personal life
- Born: January 11, 1872 Bhera, Punjab, British India
- Died: January 13, 1957 (aged 85) Rabwah, Punjab, Pakistan
- Education: University of London
- Known for: Spreading Islam in North America
- Occupation: Muslim Missionary, Religious Scholar, and Civil Rights Activist

Religious life
- Religion: Ahmadiyya Islam

Mufti Muhammad Sadiq (January 11, 1872 – January 13, 1957) was a companion of Mirza Ghulam Ahmad and an Ahmadi Muslim missionary in the United States. Sadiq converted over seven hundred Americans to Islam directly, and over one thousand indirectly. His purpose, as a representative of the Ahmadiyya Movement in Islam, was to convert Americans to Islam and to clear general misconceptions about the religion. Something that separated Mufti Muhammad Sadiq from his contemporaries was his belief in racial integration between all racial and ethnic groups, and not just African Americans. He was also important in the movement of trying to unite a multicultural group of Muslim immigrants, from Arabs to Bosnians, to build mosques and have congregational prayers, especially in Detroit and Chicago.

Sadiq entered the US without any financial resources, and embarked upon spreading the message of Islam in an area that was completely alien to his native culture. Consequently, he faced many difficulties, trials, and tribulations due to his skin color and religion. Sadiq also managed to establish the Moslem Sunrise, the longest running Muslim publication in America, as well as writing many articles on Islam in various American periodicals and newspapers.
