= List of translations of the Quran =

This is a list of translations of the Quran.

This is a sub-article to Qur'an translations.

== Historical (up to the 21st century) ==
=== 7th–10th centuries ===
- Salman the Persian translated the first chapter of the Qur'an, Al-Fatiha, from Arabic to Persian.
- Greek: The purpose is unknown but it is confirmed to be the first-ever complete translation of the Quran. It is known (and substantial fragments of it are preserved) because it was used by Nicetas Byzantius, a scholar from Constantinople, in his 'Refutation' written between 855 and 870.
- Although not existing today, a Sindhi translation was completed in 884 in Alwar (present-day Sindh, Pakistan), which had been commissioned by Abdullah bin Umar bin Abdul Aziz.

This is inferred from two references: "...an anonymous early 9th century Kashmiri Hindu king..." wrote a letter to Amir Abdullah bin Umar bin Abdul Aziz of Mansura, requesting him to dispatch a scholar to his court who could explain the tenets of the Islamic Shariah in the language "al-Hindia". The 9th-century Persian traveller Buzurg bin Shahryar mentions in his travelogue, Ajaib-ul-Hind [The Wonders of India], that the Hindu king of Mehroke in Kashmir had commissioned the preparation of a Kashmiri translation of the Quran.

- An incomplete Berber translation may have been promulgated by the Barghawata King Salih ibn Tarif in the 8th century, radically expanded with original, non-Quranic material which he claimed had been revealed to him.

=== 10th century ===
- Tafsir-e Tabari: The first complete translation of the Quran in Persian, along with its tafsir, which has survived till today. The book is a translation of Tafsir al-Tabari in Arabic.

=== 11th century ===
- Persian translation which is called Qur'an Quds was translated by an unknown translator.
- Kashf al-Israr wa 'Eddat al-Abrar (lit. Unveiling of the Mysteries and Provision of the Righteous): Complete translation and tafsir of Quran in Persian by one of the students of Abu Mansur Abdullah al-Ansari. The book is available and has been published.

=== 12th century ===
- 1143, Latin, Lex Mahumet pseudoprophete, by a group led by Robert of Ketton and Hermann of Carinthia, under direction of Peter the Venerable.
- Tafsir Nasafi: Complete Persian translation, along with the Quran exegesis, by Najm al-Din Abu Hafs al-Nasafi. The work has recently been published.

Quran was translated into Punjabi by Sufis of Punjab in Shah Mukhi script for ease of understanding for the local population (Punjabis). Same Sufis had earlier created "Shah Mukhi" script by combining Arabic and Persian alphabets.

=== 13th century ===
- 1193–1216, Latin, an improved Latin translation from Arabic by Mark of Toledo (fl. 1193–1216)

=== 16th century ===
- 1518–1525: Latin translation of the Quran by Juan Gabriel of Teruel and Leo Africanus, which was commissioned by Giles of Viterbo.
- 1543 reprint Latin text of Lex Mahumet pseudoprophete (1143), edited by Theodor Bibliander.
- 1547 enigmatical Italian edition, printed at Venice.
- Belarusian Tatars` manuscripts (kitabs)

=== 17th century ===
- 17th century Malay, Tafsir Tarjuman al-Mustafid by Shaikh Abdur Ra'uf al-Fansuri from Aceh Sultanate. This is the first translation in Malay. The translation is in the classical Malay language (not to be confused with Malaysian) before it evolved into Indonesian and Malaysian in recent times. This translation was written with Jawi script.
- 1616, German, Alcoranus Mahometicus from Italian by Salomon Schweigger, Nuremberg.
- 1622, Latin, Animadversiones, Notae ac Disputationes in Pestilentem Alcoranum (MS A-IV-4), which also includes the complete original Arabic text. It was translated by the Genoese Jesuit priest Ignazio Lomellini (1560–1645).
- 1632, Latin, Turcarum Alcoranus from Arabic by Johann Zechendorff (1580–1662), unpublished manuscript
- 1647, French, L'Alcoran de Mahomet from Arabic by Andre du Ryer, the third from the original Arabic directly into a European language, the first two being to Latin (12th century, 13th century).
- 1649, English, Alcoran of Mahomet from the French by Alexander Ross.
- 1657, Dutch, Mahomets Alkoran translated from the French by Jan Hendriksz Glazemaker.
- 1686, Polish, the Minsk tafsir, first suras were written in Turkish, but from the 19th and onwards they were written in Polish using the Arabic alphabet, translation by Tatars.
- 1698, Latin, a third Latin translation from Arabic, extensively annotated, sometimes from a Christian perspective, preceded by a biography of the Prophet and a discussion of Islamic doctrines, by Father Louis Maracci, Padua.

=== 18th century ===
- 1716, Russian, «Алкоран о Магомете, или Закон турецкий» (Al-Koran of Mahomet, or the Turkish Law) by P. V. Postnikov.
- 1734, English, The Koran by George Sale, Translated into English immediately from the original Arabic with explanatory notes and commentaries and evidently making use of the Latin translation of Maracci (1698).
- 1749, Sindhi, "Tafsir-e-Hashmi" by Makhdoom Muhammad Hashim Thattvi. First commentary of the Quran in Sindhi and the most ancient translation of Quran in Sindhi that could be found.
- 1790, Russian, "Книга Аль-Коран аравлянина Магомета ..." by M. I. Veryovkin.
- 1792, Russian, "Ал-Коран Магомедов ..." by A. V. Kolmakov.
- 1793, Persian, Tafsir 'Azizi, Abd al-Aziz Dehlawi

=== 19th century ===
- 1828, Urdu, Muzihul-al-Quran by Shah Abdul Qadir Dehlvi, first Urdu translation of Quran
- 1834, Gustav Leberecht Flügel's text formed the foundation of modern Qur'an research and the basis for several new translations into European languages.
- 1834 Swedish Koran öfversatt från arabiska originalet by Johan Fredrik Sebastian Crusenstolpe
- 1858, Polish, Quran (al Quran) by Jan Murza Tarak Buczacki.
- 1861, English, The Koran by John Medows Rodwell.
- 1864, Russian, "Коран Магомеда" by K. Nikolayev.
- 1871 (issued 1995), Russian, "Коран Магомеда" by D. N. Boguslavsky.
- 1878 (reissued a lot of times), Russian, "Коран, законодательная книга мохаммеданского вероучения" by G. S. Sablukov.
- 1880, English, The Koran, by Edward Henry Palmer.
- 1886, Bengali, by Girish Chandra Sen
- 1895, Serbian, "Коран" by Mićo Ljubibratić
- 1896, Urdu,Tarjuma-i Qur’an by Nazeer Ahmad Dehlvi

=== 20th century ===
Later translated into various other languages including English.

- 1902, Urdu, Tarjamul Quran by Maulana Aashiq Ilahi Meeruti.
- 1905, Urdu, Bayanul Quran by Maulana Ashraf Ali Thanvi.
- 1909, Western Armenian, Ղուրան by Abraham Amirkhanyan.
- 1911, Western Armenian, Քուրան (Հանդերձ Մուհամմէտի կենսագրութեամբ) by Levon Larents.
- 1912, Western Armenian, Գուրան by Hagop Kurbetian.
- 1910 Urdu, "Tafseer E Siddiqui" By[Bahrululoom Muhammad Abdul Quadeer Siddiqui (HASRAT) RH.
- 1912, Urdu, Kanzul Iman by Maulana Ahmad Raza Khan.
- 1912, Romanian, Coranul by Silvestru Octavian Isopescul
- 1915–19, Urdu, Tarjuma Shaikhul Hind by Maulana Mahmud ul Hasan Deobandi.
- 1917, English, The English Translation of the Holy Qur'an with Commentary by Maulana Muhammad Ali.
- 1961 Urdu, Mafhoom-ul-Quran by Ghulam Ahmed Perwez.
- 1930, English, The Meaning of the Glorious Koran, by Marmaduke Pickthall.(ISBN 1-879402-51-3)
- 1934, English, The Holy Qur'an: Text, Translation and Commentary, by Abdullah Yusuf Ali.(ISBN 0-915957-76-0)
- 1936, Croatian, Kur'an by Hafiz Muhamed Pandža and Džemaludin Čaušević
- 1936, Hebrew, AlQur'an, by Josef Rivlin.
- 1943-1955/1980, Turkish, Tanrı Buyruğu: Kur’ân-ı Kerîm’in Tercüme ve Tefsiri (İstanbul 1943, 1947, 1955, 1980), by Ömer Rıza Doğrul
- 1955, English, The Koran Interpreted: A Translation, by Arthur John Arberry.(ISBN 0-684-82507-4)
- 1963 (reissued a lot of times), Russian, "Коран" by I. Yu. Krachkovsky.
- 1971, English, The Quran, by Muhammad Zafrulla Khan.
- 1971, Hebrew, HaQur'an, by Aharon Ben-Shemesh.
- 1974, English, The Message of the Qur'an : Presented in Perspective by Hashim Amir Ali (Hyderabad, Deccan, India). He translated the Qur'an into English and arranged it according to chronological order.
- 1978, Kannada, Divya Qur'an, Qur'an Majid, (An effort of six scholars: Mawlana Shah Abd al-Qadir, Mawlana Sayyid, Abu Raihan Ahmed Noori, Abd Allah Sahib, I’jaz al-Din and Abd al-Ghaffar), 2 volumes, Bangalore.
- 1980, Kurdish, Tefsîra Şîrîn by Mula Muhammad Shirine Nivili.
- 1980, English Transliteration, Arabic Text written in Latin Script by Maulana Maqsood Ahmad Naseem, Germany.
- 1980, English, The Message of The Qur'an by Muhammad Asad (born as Leopold Weiss a Polish Jew, converted to Islam in 1926).
- 1981, English, Al Qur'aan, by As Sayyid Imam Isa Al Haadi Al Mahdi, founder of the Ansaaru Allah Community of the West.
- 1985, English, Noble Qur'an, by Muhammad Muhsin Khan.
- 1985, English, The Qur'an: First American Version, by T. B. Irving.
- 1986, Polish Koran by Józef Bielawski.
- 1987, Kurdish Nami Tafsir by Abdul Karim Mudarris.
- 1987, Hungarian Korán by Róbert Simon.
- 1989-05, English, The Qur'an, by Muhammad Habib Shakir.
- 1989, Kurdish Hazhar Tafsir by Abdurrahman Sharafkandi.
- 1990s, Khowar also known as Chitrali Language, spoken in the North West of Pakistan bordering Afghanistan, by Qari Syed Bazurg Shah Al-Azhari (Sitara Imtiaz).
- 1990, Belarusian, Свяшчэнны Каран. Анталогія, by Tomasz Tamaszewicz, Hrodna, Belarus
- 1991, English, The Clarion Call of the Eternal Qur-aan, by Muhammad Khalilur Rahman from Dhaka, Bangladesh.
- 1991, Hindi, Quran Sharif: Anuwad awr Vyakhya by Jamiat Ulama Hind, New Delhi, India.
- 1993, Sindhi, Kanzul-i-iman by Mufti Muhammad Raheem Sikandri Pir jo Goth Dargah Shareef Pir Pagara.
- 1993, English, A Simple Translation of The Holy Qur'an (with notes on Topics of Science), by Mir Aneesuddin.
- 1994, Kurdish, "Qurana Pîroz û Arşa Wê ya Bilind" by Abdullah Varli.
- 1995, Russian, «Коран» by T. A. Shumovsky.
- 1995, Russian, «Коран» by M.-N. O. Osmanov.
- 1996, English, El's Holy Qur'an, by Malachi Z. York for the Holy Tabernacle Ministries.
- 1997, Russian, "Коран" by V. M. Porokhova.
- 1998, Swedish, Koranens budskap, by Mohammed Knut Bernström
- 1998, Urdu, English Bayan-ul-Quran by Israr Ahmed
- 1998, Turkish, Kur'an-ı Kerim ve Türkçe Meâl-i Âlisi, by Ömer Öngüt
- 1999, German, Edlen Qur’ân by Ömer Öngüt
- 2000, Romanian, Coranul by George Grigore

=== 21st century ===
- 2001, Kurdish, "تەفسیرا ژیان" by Ismail Sgeri.
- 2002, Russian, "Коран" by E. R. Kuliyev.
- 2003, Kurdish, "Meala Fîrûz Şerha Qur’ana Pîroz" by Mula Muhammad Garsi Farqini.
- 2004, Kurdish, "تەفسیری ئاسان" by Burhan Muhammad Amin.
- 2005, Kurdish, "تەفسیری ڕامان" by Ahmed Kaka Mahmood.
- 2005 (January), Bengali, "Al-Qur-aa-nul-Hakeem" by Professor Maulana Hafez Shaikh Ainul Bari Aliavee, Published by Sufia Prakashani, Kolkata (INDIA). ISBN 978-81-941079-0-3
- 2006, Eastern Armenian, Սուրբ Ղուրան by Eduard Hakhverdyan.
- 2007, Burushaski, "Al Qur'an Al Karim, Burushaski Tarjuma (القرآن الکریم برشسکی ترجمہ)" by Aalijah Ghulam Uddin Ghulam Hunzai, Published by Oxford Gilgit Printers
- 2007, Kurdish, "Ronahîya Qur’ana Pîroz" by Mula Muhammad Hakari.
- 2007, English, The Noble Quran: Meaning With Explanatory Notes by Taqi Usmani
- 2007 Quran: a Reformist Translation (Non-sexist, non-sectarian translation). Edip Yüksel, Layth al-Shaiban, Martha Schulte-Nafeh, ISBN 0-9796715-0-7.
- 2007, Urdu, "Noor e Imaan" by Moulana Syed Abid Khundmeeri
- 2008, Kurdish, "تەفسیرا ساناهی" by Tahsin Ibrahim Doski.
- 2009, Kurdish, "Qur’ana pîroz Kurdî" by Tenvir Neshriyat.
- 2010, Kurdish, "Nura Qelban" by Muhammad Shoshiki.
- 2010, Telugu, Divya Quran Sandesham by Abdul-Raheem Mohammed Moulana
- 2011, English, "AL Quran: By Allah" by Muhammad Kamran Khan.ISBN 978-0-359-61611-4
- 2012, Kannada, "Kannadalli Quran Anuvada" by Abdussalam Puthige
- 2013, Bengali, "Tafseerul Quran" by Muhammad Asadullah Al-Ghalib, Published by Hadeeth Foundation Bangladesh, can be downloaded in PDF from: ahlehadeethbd.org
- 2013, Georgian "The Quran" by Giorgi Lobzhanidze.
- 2013, English, The Qur'an: A New Annotated Translation, AJ Droge, Equinox Publishing Ltd,
- 2014, Kurdish, "تەفسیری تەوحید" by Abdul Qadir Tawhidi.
- 2014, Kurdish, "Qur’ana Kerîm û meala wêya Kurdî" by Fikri Amedi.
- 2014, Urdu "Mukammal Tafseerul Quran" by Mufti shaukat Ali Fehmi, Published by Din Dunia Publishing Co. jama masjid Delhi
- 2015, Kurdish "پوختەی تەفسیری قورئان" by Muhammad Mula Saleh Bamoki.
- 2015, Western Armenian, Գուրան-ը քերիմ and Eastern Armenian, Ղուրան-ը քերիմ.
- 2016, English," Selected collections of Holy Quran in English: A companion for Young Muslims to understand the Divine Messages of Prophet Mohammad" by Syed N Asad, MD ISBN 978-1523877645
- 2016, English, "The Quran: A Complete Revelation" by Sam Gerrans.
- 2016, "The Holy Quran and its meaning translation in Georgian language" by Emamqoli Batvani
- 2017, Slovene, "Koran, prevod iz arabskega izvirnika" by Mohsen Alhady and Margit P. Alhady, ISBN 9789612429676
- 2018, Polish, "Koran" by Musa Çaxarxan Czachorowski, Polish Tatar, ISBN 9788365802088.
- 2018, Kurdish, "Reber Kurdish Tafsir" by Salahadin Abdul Karim.
- 2018, Kurdish, "تەفسیری پێشەنگ" by Anwar Aziz Koye.
- 2021, Belarusian, Свяшчэнны каран, by Aliaksiej Kryŭcoŭ.
- 2022, Arabic in Latein Script, "Quraan (Transcription)" Called Quran Transliteration in English by Maqsood Ahmad Naseem,(originally published independently, 1988). ISBN 978-3982499109, Deutsche Nationalbibliothek.
- 2022, English, The Easy Quran: A Translation in Simple English. Translated by Tahir Mahmood Kiani. Ta-Ha Publishers Ltd. 2022, (originally published independently, 2019).ISBN 978-1915357007
- 2022, Urdu, "Quraani Khazaiyen" "قرآنی خزائن" Exegessis of Quran by Maqsood Ahmad Naseem, Published in Germanay. ISBN 978-3-9824991-1-6, Deutsche Nationalbibliothek.
- 2023, Bangla, "Tarjamatul Quran" by Muhammad Asadullah Al-Ghalib
- 2023 Memoni, "Noor-Ul-Quran Al-Kareem" ‘‘نور القرآن الکریم ’’ Memoni translation of "Kanz-Ul-Iman" (in Urdu alphabets) by Muhammad Younus Ibrahim Chhotani. "Kanz-Ul-Iman" is an Urdu translation of Holy Quran by Aala Hazrat Ahmed Raza Khan barelvi.
- 2023. Memoni, "Noor-Ul-Quran Al-Hameed" ’’نورالقرآن الحمید‘‘ Memoni translation of "Fateh-Ul-Hameed" (in Urdu alphabets) by Muhammad Younus Ibrahim Chhotani. "Fateh-Ul-Hameed" is an Urdu translation of Holy Quran by Hazrat Fateh Muhammad Khan Jalandhary.
- 2023 Memoni, "Noor-Ul-Quran Shareef ": Memoni translation of "Kanz-Ul-Iman" (in Roman Memoni- English alphabets) by Muhammad Younus Ibrahim Chhotani. "Kanz-Ul-Iman" is an Urdu translation of Holy Quran by Aala Hazrat Ahmed Raza Khan barelvi.
- 2023 Memoni, "Noor-Ul-Quran Al-Hakeem" Memoni translation of "Fateh-Ul-Hameed" (in Roman Memoni-English alphabets) by Muhammad Younus Ibrahim Chhotani. "Fateh-Ul-Hameed" is an Urdu translation of Holy Quran by Hazrat Fateh Muhammad Khan Jalandhary.
- 2023 Shohoj Bangla Quran (সহজ বাংলা কুরআন ) Translation of Holy Quran in Bangla by Engineer Lt Colonel M Alauddin, psc. Published by Mowla Brothers, Dhaka, Bangladesh
- 2023, The Glorious Quran - English Translation with annotations based on earliest authoritative sources by Zafarul-Islam Khan, Published for Institute of Islamic and Arab Studies by Pharos Media & Publishing Pvt Ltd, New Delhi. (With parallel Arabic ISBN 978-81-7221-134-9) (English only edition: ISBN 978-81-7221-135-6)
- 2026, Korean, "The Holy Qur'an: Korean Translation of the Meanings" by Dr. Hamid Choi Yong-kil

== By writer and language ==
=== Adyghe ===
- The Adyghe translation of the Quran was completed by Ishak Mashbash. A Kabardian edition was also published.

=== Acehnese ===
- Translation in Acehnese poem, by Teungku Mahyiddin Yusuf in 1995. The manuscript is written in Jawi script but later converted into Latin script in printed version. (see PDF)

=== Afrikaans ===
- Die Heilige Qur'ān, by Imam Muhammad A Baker. First edition 1961. The style of Afrikaans dates from the 1940s–1960s. The author deliberately used spelling which mimics Arabic pronunciation even if those words have been taken up into mainstream Afrikaans with a different spelling or pronunciation. It is a literal translation, but the text reads like normal, idiomatic Afrikaans, with a few errors. The word "surah" was translated "hoofstuk" (meaning "chapter"). The book does not contain the Arabic text.
- A newer Afrikaans translation of the Qur'an was made using the principles of dynamic equivalence, but that version is not popular among Afrikaans Muslims.

=== Albanian ===
- Ilo Mitkë Qafëzezi, first part Romania, 1921, second part Korçë, 1927. Translated from English (George Sale, 1734).
- Feti Mehdiu: Kur'an-i, Pristina, 1985, revised edition: Kur'an-i shqip, Shkup, 1999. Translated from Arabic.
- Hasan Efendi Nahi: Kur'ani i madhëruar, Pristina, 1988, revised edition: Kurani i madhërishëm, Unknown, 2014. Translated from Arabic.
- H. Sherif Ahmeti: Kur'an-i, Pristina, 1988, Medina, 1992, Shkup, 1999, Unknown, 2002, revised edition: Kurani i madhërishëm, Unknown, 2014. Translated from Arabic.
- Kurani Kerim, by Muhammad Zakria Khan. First published in UK in 1990. Second revised edition in 2003. Islam International Publications. (ISBN 978-1-85372-324-7).

=== Armenian ===
- Ղուրան by Abraham Amirkhanyan (1909, Western Armenian)
- Քուրան (Հանդերձ Մուհամմէտի կենսագրութեամբ) by Levon Larents (1911, Western Armenian)
- Գուրան by Hagop Kurbetian (1912, Western Armenian)
- Սուրբ Ղուրան by Eduard Hakhverdyan (2006, Eastern Armenian)
- Գուրան-ը քերիմ (2015, Western Armenian), and Ղուրան-ը քերիմ (2015, Eastern Armenian)

=== Assamese ===
- 1940 by Ataur Rahman, Ahmdiyya
- 1962 by Sader Ali, a clear simple and straight forward translation.
- 1970 by Muhammad Sadr ‘Ali (Gauhati)
- Zohurul Hoque. Second revised edition published in 2007 by Bina Library. The book has parallel transliteration of Arabic text into Assamese.
- 2000, by Professor Syed Shamsul Huda and Mohammad Majid Ali, based on Maulana Syed Abul A'la Maududi's Tarjame-e-Quran Majid, published by Asomia Islami Sahitya Prakashan.

=== Azerbaijani ===
- Mir Məhəmməd Kərim ağa (1906)
- Mahammad Hasan Movlazadeh Shakavi (1908)
- Vasim Mammadaliyev (1971)
- Ziya Bunyadov

=== Balochi ===
- by Moulana Huzoor Bakhsh
- Mawlana Khair Ali Nadwiجمال القرآن by Mawlana Khair Mohammad Nadwi
- by Shaikh Abdul Gaffar Zamurani
- Allama Qazi Abdul Samad Sarbazi and Mawlana Khair Mohammad Nadwi

=== Belarusian ===
- Kitabs written in Belarusian Arabic alphabet during 15th — 19th centuries.
- Tomasz Tamaszewicz
- Aliaksiej Izmail Kryŭcoŭ

=== Bengali ===
- A partial translation of only the 30th para by Maulana Amir Uddin Basunia of Rangpur in 1808.
- Girish Chandra Sen (1886), first complete translation. He is usually credited as the first Bengali translator of Quran.
- Maulana Muhiuddin Khan.
- Abbas Ali (West Bengal).
- Muhammad Mustafizur Rahman (Died Jan 2014), কোরআন শরীফ (বঙ্গানুবাদ) Koran Sharif (Bengali translation). Published from: Dhaka, Bangladesh. Publisher: Khoshroz Kitab Mahal.
- Nurur Rahman, 1984, (Bengali translation of the work by Ashraf Ali Thanvi).
- 2005 (January), Bengali, Al-Qur-aa-nul-Hakeem (আলকুরআ-নুল হাকীম) by Professor Maulana Hafez Shaikh Ainul Bari Aliavee. Published by Sufia Prakashani, Kolkata (INDIA). ISBN 978-81-941079-0-3
- Rafiqur Rahman Chowdhury, 2011, (Bengali translation of the English translation of Quran by Abdullah Yusuf Ali).
- Justice Habibur Rahman
- 2013: Muhammad Asadullah Al-Ghalib, Tafseerul Quran. Published by Hadeeth Foundation Bangladesh.

2023: Muhammad Asadullah Al-Ghalib, Tarjamatul Quran. A full Bangla translation of the noble Quran with short exegesis.

- Dr Zōhurul Hoque
- Muhammad Mujibur Rahman. Published by Darus Salam.
- D. Abubakar Muhammad Zakaria.
- Panna Chowdhury, Chhondoboddho Bangla Quran (2006), First complete poetic translation in Bengali.
- Shohoj Bangla Quran, (সহজ বাংলা কুরআন ) Translation of Holy Quran in Bangla by Engineer Lt Colonel M Alauddin, psc, Publisher: Mowla Brothers, Dhaka, Bangladesh. Published in October 2023.

=== Bhojpuri ===
- 2024, by Murli Manohar Srivastava

=== Bhoti ===
- 2009-??, by Dr. Mohammad Umar Nadvi

=== Bosnian ===
- Muhamed Pandža and Džemaludin Čaušević: Kur'an. Translated from Turkish (Ömer Rıza Doğrul, 1934). Sarajevo, 1937, Zagreb (editors: Omer Mušić and Alija Nametak), 1969, 1972, 1974, 1978, 1984, 1985, 1989, 1990, 2000, Dubai, 1993, Sarajevo, 2011, 2012, 2014.
- Ali Riza Karabeg: Kur'an. A compilation of the Serbian translation (Mićo Ljubibratić, 1895). Mostar, 1937, Sarajevo, 1942, Zagreb, 1991, Sarajevo, 2019.
- Besim Korkut: Kur'an. Sarajevo, 1977, 1984, 1987, 1989, 2000, 2001, 2005, 2007, 2009, 2010, 2012, 2017, 2019, Medina, 1991, Zagreb, 1993, Tuzla, 1993, Zenica, 1995, Novi Pazar, 2011, 2024, Bar, 2021.
- Mustafa Mlivo: Kur'an. Bugojno, 1994, 1995, 2004.
- Enes Karić: Kur'an. Sarajevo, 1995, Bihać, 2006, 2008, 2013.
- Ramo Atajić: Kur'an. Translated from German. München, 2001.
- Esad Duraković: Kur'an. Sarajevo, 2004, revised edition: Sarajevo, 2025.
- Hilmo Ćerimović: Kur'an. Translated from English (Muhammad Asad, 1980). Sarajevo, 2004.
- Fahrija Avdić and Wasim Ahmad: Kur'an. Translated from English (Maulvi Sher Ali Ranjha, 1955). Frankfurt am Main, 2007.
- Muhamed Mehanović: Kur'an. Sarajevo, 2013, Zenica, 2014, revised edition: Sarajevo, 2022, 2023, 2024, 2025, Novi Pazar, 2023.
- Nurko Karaman: Kur'an. Sarajevo, 2018.

=== Brahui ===
- 1916: By Molavi Ummar Deenpuri

=== Burushaski ===
- Ghulam Uddin Ghulam Hunzai (2007)

=== Buginese ===
- 1994: Tafsir by K.H. Abdul Muin Yusuf et al. in Lontara script.

=== Bulgarian ===
- Tzvetan Teophanov: 1997, 1999, 2006. (ISBN 954-9571-01-7).

=== Burmese ===
- 1912, by Haji U Kaalu
- 1961, by Thiripyanchi U Ba Sein
- 1977-80, by late Muffasirul Quran Allamah Ghazi Muhammed Hashim and late Maulana Maqsud Ahmad Khan.
- 2006, by Unknown

=== Catalan ===
- Mikel de Epalza: 2001. (ISBN 978-8-48256-958-1).

=== Chinese ===
- The Translation of some part of Quran was done during ming dynasty.
- Li Tiezheng (李铁铮), 1927, Beijing. (First complete published translation; from Japanese and English).
- Wang Jingzhai (王靜齋), 1932, 1943, 1946. (First from Arabic by a Muslim scholar; includes extensive commentary).
- Liu Jinbiao (刘锦标), 1943.
- Yang Jingxiu (杨敬修), 1947. (In classical Chinese).
- Ma Jian (马坚), 1981 (posthumous). (One of the most widely circulated editions in mainland China).
- Tong Daoquan (仝道章), 1989.
- Shen Xiazun (沈遐淮), 1996, Taipei.
- The Holy Quran with Chinese translation and Commentary. Printed by Bestprint Printing Company, Singapore. Published by Islam International Publications 1990. (ISBN 978-1-85372-278-3).
- Yusuf Ma Dexin, 宝命真经直解 (True Revealed Scripture)
- A Dachang Hui Imam, Ma Zhenwu, wrote a Qur'an translation into Chinese including Chinese characters and Xiao'erjing.

=== Czech ===
- Some excerpts are translated in polemic treatise Antialkorán (Counter-Quran) by Václav Budovec z Budova, 1614 and 1989.
- Korán, translated by Ignác Veselý, 1912.
- Korán, translated by Alois Richard Nykl, 1938.
- Korán, translated by Ivan Hrbek, 1972, 1991, 2000, 2006, 2007 and 2012 (the most widely used translation today).

=== Danish ===
- Ellen Wulff (translated in 2006)
- Koranen med dansk oversættelse og noter (Qur'an with Danish translation and notes) by Abdul Salam Madsen. Published by Islam International Publications Limited. (ISBN 978-1-85372-034-5).

=== Dari ===
- Quran translation in Dari language.

=== Divehi ===
- Quran translation into Divehi Language.

=== Dogri ===
==== India ====
- Azra Chowdhury Pavittar Quran पवित्तर क़ुरान in 2019.

==== Pakistan ====
- Translation of Fazal Hussain Awan and Moulana Ghulam Mohi-ud-Din.

=== Dutch ===
(in chronological order of publication)

- Barent Adriaensz Berentsma, 1641, De Arabische Alkoran, Door de Zarazijnsche en de Turcksche Prophete Mahometh, In drie onderscheyden deelen begrepen, Hamburg [= Amsterdam], Barent Adriaensz Berentsma. Based on the German translation (1616) by Salomon Schweigger.
- Jan Hendriksz Glazemaker, 1657, Mahomets Alkoran, Door de Heer Du Ryer uit d'Arabische in de Fransche taal gestelt, Amsterdam, Jan Rieuwertsz. Based on the French translation (1647) by André du Ryer; reprinted in 1658, 1696, 1698, 1707, 1721 and 1743.
- Ludovicus Jacobus Antonius Tollens, 1859, Mahomed's Koran, gevolgd naar de Fransche vertaling van Kasimirski, de Engelsche van Sale, de Hoogduitsche van Ullmann en de Latijnsche van Maracci, Batavia, Lange en Co.
- Salomon Keyzer, 1860, De Koran, voorafgegaan door het leven van Mahomet, eene inleiding omtrent de godsdienstgebruiken der Mahomedanen, enz., Haarlem, J.J. van Brederode. Reprinted in 1879, 1905, 1916 and 1925.
- Sudewo Partokusomo Kertohadinegoro, 1934, De Heilige Qoer-an, vervattende den Arabischen tekst met ophelderende aanteekeningen en voorrede, Batavia, Drukkerij Visser & Co. Based on the English translation (1917) by Muhammad Ali. Also includes the Arabic text; reprinted in 1968, 1981 and 1996.
- Nasirah B. Zimmermann, 1953, De Heilige Qor'aan, met Nederlandse vertaling, Rabwah/[The Hague]: "The Oriental & Religious Publishing Corporation"/Zuid-Hollandse Uitgevers Maatschappij. Also includes the Arabic text; reprinted in 1969, 1983 and 1991.
- Johannes Hendrik Kramers, 1956, De Koran uit het Arabisch vertaald, Amsterdam/Brussels, Elzevier. Many reprints.
- Fred Leemhuis, 1989, De Koran: Een weergave van de betekenis van de Arabische tekst, Houten, Het Wereldvenster. Also includes the Arabic text; many reprints.
- Sofjan S. Siregar, 1996, De Edele Koran, en een vertaling van betekenissen ervan in de Nederlandse taal, The Hague, Islamitische Cultureel Centrum Nederland. Also includes the Arabic text; reprinted in 1998, 2000 and 2001.
- Jeroen Rietberg, 2004, De Heilige Korān, Nieuwe Nederlandse Vertaling: Arabische Tekst met Nederlandse Vertaling en Commentaar, Ohio: Ahmadiyya Anjuman Isha‘at Islam Lahore Inc. U.S.A., 2004. Based on the English translation (1951) by Muhammad Ali. Also includes the Arabic text.
- Kader Abdolah, 2008, De Koran: Een vertaling, Breda, De Geus. Reprinted in 2010.
- Rafiq Ahmed Fris, Mehmet Fatih Özberk & Mohammed Aarab, 2013, De Glorieuze Qorʼān En De Nederlandse Vertaling Ervan, Istanbul, Hayrât Neşriyat. Also includes the Arabic text.
- Özcan Hıdır & Fatih Okumuş, 2013, De Levende Koran: Een Nederlandse vertaalversie met weergave van de Arabische tekst en met commentaar, Rotterdam, IUR Press/Stichting Lezen & Leven. Also includes the Arabic text.
- Aboe Ismail [= Jamal Ahajjaj] & Studenten, 2013, De interpretatie van de betekenissen van de Koran, The Hague, Stichting as-Soennah. Also includes the Arabic text; reprinted in 2014.
- Stichting OntdekIslam, 2013, Interpretatie van de betekenis van de Heilige Koran, Rotterdam/Alexandria, Stichting OntdekIslam/Conveying Islamic Message Society.
- Ali Soleimani, 2014, De Koran: Een woordelijke vertaling uit het Arabisch, Drachten, Het Talenhuis.
- Eduard Verhoef, 2015, De Koran, heilig boek van de Islam, Maartensdijk, Uitgeverij Verhoef.
- Ali Ünal, 2018, De Koran, Rotterdam, Uitgeverij de Rijn.

=== English ===
(In chronological order of publication)

- Alexander Ross, 1649, The Alcoran of Mahomet: Translated out of Arabique into French by the Sieur Du Ryer.
- George Sale, 1734, Koran, Commonly called The Alcoran of Mohammed, Translated into English immediately from the Original Arabic; with Explanatory Notes, taken from the most approved Commentators. To which is prefixed a Preliminary Discourse.
- John Meadows Rodwell, 1861, The Koran. (ISBN 0-8041-1125-1).
- E.H. Palmer, 1880, The Qur'an: The Sacred Books of the East Part Nine. (ISBN 1-4179-3010-1).
- Mohammad Abdul Hakim Khan, 1905, The Holy Qur'an, Patiala.
- Mirza Abul Fazl, 1911, The Qur'an, Arabic Text and English Translation Arranged Chronologically with an Abstract, Allahabad.
- Hairat Dehlawi, 1912, The Koran Prepared, Delhi.
- Maulana Muhammad Ali, 1917 The Holy Qur'an: Text. (ISBN 0-913321-11-7).
- Al-Hajj Hafiz Ghulam Sarwar, 1929, Translation of the Holy Qur'an, Singapore and Woking, England.
- Marmaduke Pickthall, 1930, The Meaning of the Glorious Qu'ran. (ISBN 1-879402-51-3).
- Abdullah Yusuf Ali, 1934, The Meaning of the Holy Qur'an, Lahore. (ISBN 0-915957-76-0).
- Maulvi Sher Ali, 1936, The Holy Quran with English translation. (ISBN 1-85372-314-2).
- Richard Bell, 1937–39, The Qur'an. Translated, with a critical re-arrangement of the Surahs.
- Abdul Majid Daryabadi, 1941, The Holy Qur'an, English Translation, Lahore.
- Arthur John Arberry, 1955, The Koran Interpreted: A Translation. (ISBN 0-684-82507-4).
- N. J. Dawood, 1956, "The Koran". (ISBN 0-14-044558-7)
- Khadim Rahmani Nuri, 1964. "The Running Commentary of the Holy Qur-an". Shillong
- Muhammad Zafrulla Khan, 1970, "The Qur'an: The Eternal Revelation vouchsafed to Muhammad the Seal of the Prophets".(ISBN 1-56656-255-4)
- Muhammad Asad, 1980, The Message of The Qur'an.(ISBN 1-904510-00-0).
- M. H. Shakir, 1981, The Quran, Arabic and English. (ISBN 0-940368-16-1). (Controversial, see English translation controversy)
- T. B. Irving, 1985, The Qur'an: First American Version. (ISBN 0-911119-33-7).
- Zafar Ishaq Ansari, 1988 Towards Understanding the Qur'an, translated from Abul Ala Maududi's Urdu translation Tafhim al Qur'an.
- Kanzul Iman by Professor Shah faridul Haque, 1990, The Qur'an "Kanzul Iman" With a Phrase-by-Phrase English Translation, from Pakistan.
- Rashad Khalifa, (died on 31 January 1990), Quran: The Final Testament, Universal Unity, (ISBN 0-9623622-2-0).
- Allamah Nooruddin, Amatul Rahman Omar and Abdul Mannan Omar 1990, The Holy Qur'an - Arabic Text and English Translation (ISBN 0976697238).
- T. B. Irving, 1991 Noble Qur'an: Arabic Text & English Translation (ISBN 0-915597-51-9)
- Mir Aneesuddin, 1993 "A Simple Translation of The Holy Qur'an (with notes on Topics of Science)"
- Emily Assami, Mary Kennedy, Amatullah Bantley: 1997, The Qur’ān Saheeh International Translation
- Muhammad Muhsin Khan and M. Taqi-ud-Din Al-Hilali, 1999. The Noble Quran (ISBN 1-59144-000-9)
- AbdalHaqq and Aisha Bewley, 1999&2005 The Noble Qur'an: A New Rendering of its Meaning in English, Bookwork. (ISBN 0-9538639-3-X).
- Zohurul Hoque, 2000, Translation and Commentary on The Holy Quran, Holy Qur'An Pub. Project. (ISBN 0-9678304-0-0).
- S.M. Afzal-ur-Rahman, 2001, The Holy Quran.
- Ahmed Ali, 2001, Al-Qur'an, a Contemporary Translation. (ISBN 0-691-07499-2) (ISBN 978-0-691-07499-3).
- Muhammad Taqiuddin Sarwar, 2001, The Holy Qur'an, Islamic Seminary Inc. (ISBN 0-941724-00-X).
- Shabbir Ahmed, 2003, Galaxy.
- The Message: God's Revelation to Humanity, 2003, by ProgressiveMuslims.Org, iUniverse, Inc. (ISBN 0-595-29035-3)(ISBN 978-0-595-29035-2)
- Ali, Muhammad Mohar (2003). A Word for Word Meaning of the Qur'an. Ipswich, Suffolk: Jamiat Ihyaa Minhaaj al-Sunnah. OCLC 660023946.
- Muhammad Abdel-Haleem, 2004, The Qur'an (Oxford World Classics). (ISBN 0-19-283193-3).
- Thomas Cleary, 2004, The Qur'an: A New Translation.(ISBN 1-929694-44-X)
- Ali Quli Qara'i, 2005, The Qur'an With a Phrase-by-Phrase English Translation, ICAS Press. (ISBN 1-904063-20-9).
- Ali Ünal, 2006 The Qur'an with Annotated Interpretation in Modern English. (ISBN 978-1-59784-000-2).
- Alan Jones, 2007, The Qur'an Translated into English, Oxford, Gibb Memorial Trust. (ISBN 978-0-906094-63-1).
- Edip Yüksel, Layth al-Shaiban, Martha Schulte-Nafeh, 2007 Quran: a Reformist Translation (Non-sexist, non-sectarian translation). (ISBN 0-9796715-0-7).
- Laleh Bakhtiar, 2007 The Sublime Quran.
- Syed Vickar Ahamed, 2007, The Glorious Qur'an (Interpretation of the Meaning of). (ISBN 978-1-879402-68-3)
- Mufti Afzal Hoosen Elias, 2007, Quran Made Easy - Arabic & English
- Tahereh Saffarzadeh, translated Qur'an in Persian and English (bilingual).
- Justice Mufti Taqi Usmani, 2008, comprehensive Translation with explanatory notes, THE NOBLE QURAN, (ISBN 978-969-564-000-5)
- The Quran: Translation and Commentary with Parallel Arabic Text (2009) by Maulana Wahiduddin Khan. Published in India.
- Tarif Khalidi, 2009, The Qur'an: A New Translation, Penguin Classics (ISBN 978-0-14-310588-6).
- P. JainulAbideen, 2010, Al-Quran, (Beta Translation).
- Tahir-ul-Qadri, 2011, The Glorious Qur'an, Minhaj-ul-Qur'an publications. (ISBN 978-1-908229-00-7)
- AJ Droge, 2013, The Qur'an: A New Annotated Translation,
- Tahir Mahmood Kiani, 2022, The Easy Quran: A Translation in Simple English., Ta-Ha Publishers Ltd. 2022, (originally published independently, 2019). (ISBN 978-1915357007)
- Talal Itani, 2012, Quran in Modern English: Clear and Easy to Read, ClearQuran Publishing (ISBN 1467948748)
- Syed Vickar Ahamed, 2015, Interpretation of the Meaning of The Glorious Qur'an, Library of Congress Control Number 2004096319, ISBN 978-1-87940-296-6
- Seyyed Hossein Nasr, Maria Dakake, Caner K. Dagli and Joseph E. B. Lumbard, 2015, The Study Quran Translation, Published by HarperOne: New York and San Francisco (ISBN 978-0061125867)
- Mustafa Khattab, 2015, The Clear Quran: A Thematic English Translation, Published by SirajPublications.com (ISBN 978-0-9948895-0-8)
- Safi Kaskas, 2015: The Qur'an: A Contemporary Understanding (ISBN 978-0986449406)
- Sam Gerrans, 2016, The Quran: A Complete Revelation (ISBN 978-0995492004)
- Musharraf Hussain al Azhari, 2018, The Majestic Quran: A Plain English Translation, Published by Invitation Publishing. (ISBN 978-1-902248-65-3).
- Sheikh Nuh Ha Mim Keller, 2021, The Quran Beheld (ISBN 978-0578353111)
- Ahmed Affi, 2022, The Quran: A Manual for life (ISBN 978-0954567231)
- Zafarul-Islam Khan, 2023, The Glorious Quran - English Translation with annotations based on earliest authoritative sources (with Parallel Arabic Text), Published for Institute of Islamic and Arab Studies by Pharos Media & Publishing Pvt Ltd, New Delhi (ISBN 978-81-7221-134-9)
- Zafarul-Islam Khan, 2023, The Glorious Quran - English Translation with annotations based on earliest authoritative sources (English only Edition), Published for Institute of Islamic and Arab Studies by Pharos Media & Publishing Pvt Ltd, New Delhi (ISBN 978-81-7221-135-6)
- Ahmed Affi, 2024, The Quran: A Manual for life - English Translation with Commentary and Parallel Arabic Text (ISBN 978-1068667503)

=== Esperanto ===
- Italo Chiussi, La Nobla Korano.
- Muztar Abbasi, La traduko de la Sankta Kuraano.

=== Estonian ===
- Haljand Udam, Koraan. (ISBN 978-9985-2-1314-8).
- Tarmo Marken, Koraani tõlge eesti keelde / Quran translation into Estonian language.

Published in 2016, polishing in progress 2026. www.koraan.ee - online Koraan.

=== Finnish ===
- Georg Pimenoff, Koraani Ahsen Böre,1943
- Jussi Aro, Armas Salonen ja Knut Tallqvist. Koraani WSOY, 1957
- Jaakko Hämeen-Anttila, Koraani Basam Books, 1995 (re published in 2005). (ISBN 952-9842-05-8).

=== French ===
- L'Alcoran de Mahomet / translaté d'arabe françois par le Sieur Du Ryer, Sieur de la Garde Malezair., 1647, 1649, 1672, 1683, 1719, 1734, 1770, 1775, André Du Ryer, Paris.
- Le Coran / traduit de l'arabe, accompagné de notes et précédé d'un abrégé de la vie de Mahomet, tiré des écrivains orientaux les plus estimés, Claude-Étienne Savary, 1787, 1821, 1826, Paris.
- Le Koran: traduction nouvelle faite sur le texte arabe / par M. Kasimirski interprète de la legation Française en Perse; revue et précédée d'une introduction par G. Pauthier., Biberstein-Kasimirski, 1840, 1841, 1844, Paris, 1970 Garnier Flamarion. Nouvelle édition. Le Coran, traduction de Kasimirski, suivie du Petit dictionnaire de l'islam par Thomas Decker, Maxi-livres, 2002.
- Le Coran, translated by Régis Blachère, Maisonneuve et Larose, 1950, reedited in 2005, (ISBN 2-7068-1861-1).
- Le Coran, translated by Muhammad Hamidullah and Michel Leturmy, 1959, first French translation from the Arab text made by a Muslim, (ISBN 2-84161-085-3).
- Le Coran, translation and notes by Denise Masson, Gallimard, 1967, (ISBN 2-07-010009-X).
- Le Saint Coran, Arabic text with French translation. First Edition published in 1985 by the London Mosque, second and present edition published by Islam International Publications Limited (1998), 'Islamabad', Sheephatch Lane, Tilford, Surrey, (ISBN 978-1-85372-635-4).
- Le Coran, l'appel, translation by André Chouraqui, Robert Laffont, 1990, (ISBN 2-221-06964-1).
- Le Coran, trial at translation by Jacques Berque, Albin Michel, 1995, (ISBN 2-226-07739-1).
- Le Coran, translation by Hamza Boubakeur, Maisonneuve et Larose, 1995, 2 volumes, (ISBN 2-7068-1134-X).
- Le Coran, translation by Malek Chebel, Payot, 2001, 2 volumes, (ISBN 2-228-89480-X).
- Le Coran: Nouvelle traduction française du sens de ses versets, translation by Mohamed Chiadmi, prefaced by par Tariq Ramadan, Shaykh Zakaria, Shaykh Yusuf Ibram, 2005, (ISBN 2-84862-085-4).

=== Georgian ===
- Giorgi Lobzhanidze, Tbilisi, 2013.
- Emamqoli Batvani, 2016

=== German ===
- Alcoranus Mahometicus: das ist, der Türcken Alcoran, Religion und Aberglauben: auss welchem zu vernemen wann unnd woher ihr falscher Prophet Machomet seinen Ursprung oder Anfang genommen, mit was Gelegenheit derselb diss sein Fabelwerck, lächerliche und närrische Lehr gedichtet und erfunden ... / erstlich auss der arabischen in die italianische, jetzt aber inn die teutsche Sprach gebracht durch, 1616, S. Schweigger, Nuremberg.
- Die türkische Bibel, oder der Koran. Megerlin, 1772.
- Der Koran, oder Das Gesetz für die Muselmänner, durch Muhammed den Sohn Abdall. Nebst einigen feyerlichen koranischen Gebeten unmittelbar aus dem Arabischen übersetzt. Friedrich Eberhard Boysen, 1773.
- Der Koran, oder Das Gesetz für die Moslemer, durch Muhammed den Sohn Abdall ... übersetzt. Friedrich Eberhard Boysen, 1775.
- Henning, Max. Der Koran. Übers. Leipzig, Reclam, (1901) 1968.
- Theodor Friedrich Grigull, Der Koran, Otto Hendel, Halle 1901.
- Sadr ud-Din (Übers. + Hrsg.): Der Koran. Arabisch-Deutsch; Übersetzung, Einleitung und Erklärung von Maulana Sadr ud-Din; Verlag der Moslemischen Revue (Selbstdruck); Berlin 1939; 2. unveränderte Auflage 1964;
- Der Koran, Kommentar und Konkordanz vor Rudi Paret, Kohlhammerverlag, Stuttgart Berlin Köln, 1971.
- Der Koran, Übersetzung von Rudi Paret, Kohlhammerverlag, Stuttgart Berlin Köln, 1979.
- Khoury, Adel Theodor. Der Koran. Übersetzung von Adel Theodor Khoury. Unter Mitwirkung von Muhammad Salim Abdullah. Mit einem Geleitwort von Inamullah Khan. Gütersloher Verlagshaus G. Mohn: Gütersloh, 1987
- Die Bedeutung des Korans. 5 Bände. München: SKD Bavaria. 1996 und 1997
- Rassoul, Abu-r-Rida' Muhammad Ibn Ahmad. Die ungefähre Bedeutung des Al-Qur'an al-Karim in deutscher Sprache. Hrsg. von der Muslim-Studenten-Vereinigung in Deutschland e.V. 9. Aufl. Marburg, 1997
- Al-Muntakhab : Auswahl aus den Interpretationen des Heiligen Koran; arabisch-deutsch / Arabische Republik Ägypten, Al-Azhar, Ministerium für Awqâf, Oberster Rat für Islamische Angelegenheiten. [Übersetzt von Moustafa Maher]. – Kairo : Ministerium für Awqâf / Oberster Rat für Islamische Angelegenheiten, 1999. – [46], [2104] S.
- Ömer Öngüt, Edlen Qur’ân, Hakikat, Istanbul 1999
- Amir M.A. Zaidan. At-Tafsir. Eine philologisch, islamologisch fundierte Erläuterung des Quran-Textes. ADIB Verlag Offenbach 2000
- Ahmad von Denffer. Der Koran. Die Heilige Schrift des Islam in deutscher Übertragung mit Erläuterungen nach den Kommentaren von Dschalalain, Tabari und anderen hervorragen-den klassischen Koranauslegern. 8. verbesserte Auflage. München: Islam. Zentrum, 2001
- Max Henning (Übers.), Murad Wilfried Hofmann (Überarb. & Komm.): Der Koran. Diederichs, München 2001
- Nadeem Ata Elyas und Scheich Abdullah as-Samit Frank Bubenheim. Der edle Qur'an und die Übersetzung seiner Bedeutungen in die deutsche Sprache. Medina, 1422/1423 A.H. (2002)
- Mirza Tahir Ahmad (Hrsg.): Koran. Der Heilige Qur-ân. Arabisch und Deutsch.; Verlag Der Islam; Frankfurt 1954, letzte überarbeitete Auflage 1996, unv. nachgedruckt 2003
- Maulana Muhammad Ali, Der Heilige Koran, aus dem Englischen übersetzt v. Petewr Willmer, Ahmadiyya Anjuman Isha'at Islam Lahore Inc. Dublin OH/USA; 2006
- Ali Ünal: Der Koran und seine Übersetzung mit Kommentar und Anmerkungen. Englische Originalausgabe: The Qur´an with Annotated Interpretation in Modern English (2006). Übersetzung ins Deutsche: Fatima Grimm / Wilhelm Willecke. Lektorat: Muhammed Mertek / Wilhelm Willeke. Offenbach: Fontäne 2009,
- Der Koran: das heilige Buch des Islam / [nach der Übertragung von Ludwig Ullmann neu bearbeitet und erläutert von L. W.-Winter]. – 1. Auflage. – München : Goldmann, 2007. – 506 S.
- Amir M.A. Zaidan. At-tafsiir - Der Quraan-Text und seine Transkription und Übersetzung, Islamologisches Institut, 2009,
- Der Koran / vollständig und neu übersetzt von Ahmad Milad Karimi. Mit einer Einführung herausgegeben von Bernhard Uhde. – Freiburg, Breisgau [u.a.] : Herder, 2009. – 575 S.
- Die Botschaft des Koran : Übersetzung und Kommentar / Muhammad Asad. Übersetzt von Ahmad von Denffer; Yusuf Kuhn. – Düsseldorf : Patmos, 2009. – 1262 S.
- Der Koran / aus dem Arabischen neu übertragen von Hartmut Bobzin unter Mitarbeit von Katharina *Bobzin. [121 Kalligraphen von Shahid Alam]. – München : Beck, 2010. – 821 S. (Neue orientalische Bibliothek)
- Der Koran / übersetzt und eingeleitet von Hans Zirker. – 4., überarbeitete Auflage. -[Darmstadt] : Lambertus-Schneider-Verlag, 2014. – 387 S.

=== Gojri ===
- Faiz al-Mannān, the first ever translation of the Qur'an in Gojri language, authored by Faizul Waheed.

=== Gorontalo ===
- Translation by team in 2007.

=== Greek ===
- Το Ιερό Κοράνιο (Greek). Islam International Publications Limited (1989). (ISBN 978-1-85372-322-3).

=== Gujarati ===
- Quran Majeed:Gujrati Tarjumo Ane Tafsir: This is the first Gujarati translation of the Quran and was translated by Maulana Abdul Rahim and Maulana Ghulam Mohammad Sadiq {date to be provided} and sold in their own bookshop "Kutub Khana Sadikiya Rander Gujarat India.
- Kanz-ul-Imaan wa Khazain-ul Irfan *Quran-e-Karim Saral Gujarati Tarjuma-Tafseer : This Gujrati translation is based on Urdu Translation by Fazil-e-Barelvi Imam Ahmed Raza Khan. This was translated by Maulana Hasan Aadam Kolvanvi, (Fazil-e-Dar-ul-Uloom Sha-e-Aalam) and published by Darul Uloom Moinul Uloom, Raza Nagar, At & post: Tham, Dist: Bharuch, Gujarat, INDIA.
- Kanz-ul-Imaan: Based on Urdu Translation by Fazil-e-Barelvi Imam Ahmed Raza Khan Gujarati Translation by Ghulam Razique Shaikh published From Himmatnagar, Gujarat, INDIA.
- Quran Majeed Gujarati Tarjuma Sathe (Means The holy Quran with Gujarati Translation) Ahmedbhai Sulaiman Jumani had translated the holy Quran. Its first edition was published from Karachi, Pakistan, in 1930.
- Divya Quran: This is a Gujarati translation of Maulana Abul Aala Maudoodi's Urdu Translation. Its eight editions published by Islami Sahitya Prakashan, Kalupur, Ahmedabad-380 001. Gujarat, INDIA.

=== Hebrew ===
- Der Koran / aus dem Arabischen ins Hebräische übersetzt und erläutert von Herrmann Reckendorf., 1857 H. Reckendorf, Leipzig.
- Yosef Yoel Rivlin.
- Aharon Ben-Shemesh.
- Uri Rubin, HaQur'an, 2005.
- Subhi 'Ali 'Adwi, HaQur'an BeLashon Akher, 2015.
- King Fahad Complex, 2018.
- A group of translators, 2019.

(ISBN 978-9-38658-938-5)

=== Hindi ===
- Kanzul Iman by Ala Hazrat Imam Ahmad Raza Khan Alaihirrahma, translated in the early 1910.
- Quran Sharif: Anuwad awr Vyakhya by Arshad Madani & Pro Sulaiman., 1991 H. Jamiat Ulama Hind, New Delhi, India.
- Hindi Transliteration of "Quran-e-Majeed" By Allama, Dr.Syed Ali Imam Zaidi (Gauhar Lucknavi)" Great Grand Son of Meer Baber Ali Anees" Published by:- Nizami press, Victoria Street Lucknow-226003.India.
- Irfan-ul-Quran Urdu Translation by Tahir-ul-Qadri, Anuwad and Hindi Translation by Ghulam Razique Shaikh, published on 18 February 2011 From Minhaj-ul-Quran International India, Umaj Road, At & Post Karjan, Dist: Vadodara, Gujarat, INDIA.
- Maulana Azizul Haq Umri

=== Hungarian ===
- Kassai Korán, 19th century.
- A Korán szemelvényekben by Hollósi Somogyi József, Officina, 1947.
- Korán translated by Róbert Simon. Budapest: Helikon, 1987.
- Kurán – The Holy Quran by Mihálffy Balázs, Edhi International Foundation Inc., Karachi, Pakistan.

=== Icelandic ===
- Helgi Hálfdanarson, (1993 and revised 10 years later), publisher: Mál og menning, Reykjavík (ISBN 9979-3-2408-2).

=== Indonesian/Malay ===
- Tafsir Tarjuman al-Mustafid by Shaikh Abdur Ra'uf al-Fansuri in the 17th century from Aceh Sultanate. This is the first translation in Malay. The translation is in classical Malay (not to be confused with Malay) before it evolved into Indonesian and Malaysian in modern time. This translation was written with Jawi script.
- Translation by A. Hasyim in 1936, but not complete.
- Tafsir al-Nur by Prof. T. M. Hasbi Ash-Shiddiqi in 1956.
- Tafsir al-Mishbah by Quraish Shihab in 2001.

=== Italian ===
- L'Alcorano di Macometto: nel qual si contiene la dottrina, la vita, i costumi, et le leggi sue / tradotto nuovamente dall' Arabo in lingua Italiana., 1547, Venise.
- Calza, Caval. Vincenzo, Bastia 1847, p. xiv+330.
- Il Corano, Milano 1882/ Milano 1913.
- Violante, Alfredo, Rome: Casa Ed. Latina 1912.
- Branchi, Eugenio Camillo, Roma 1913, p. 437.
- Aquilio, Milano 1914, p. lxx+[6]+340+359.
- Bonelli, Luigi, new ed. Milano 1929, p. 31+524, reprint 2nd rev. ed., Milano: Ulrico Hoepli 1972, p. 614. (4)
- Bausani, Alessandro, Firenze 1955, p. lxxix+779, Firenze 1978, p. lxxix+771.
- Moreno, Martino Mario, Torino 1967, p. viii+605, Torino 1969, p. viii+605\ 2nd ed. [n.p.] 1971, p. vii+608.
- Piccardo, Hamza Roberto, 1994: Saggio di Traduzione Interpretativa del Santo Corano inimitabile.
- Ventura, Alberto, Milano, 2010. p. LXXII+900 (traduzione di Ida Zilio-Grandi).

=== Japanese ===
There are at least seven complete translations of Qur'an:

- Sakamoto, Ken-ichi, 1920, Kōran Kyō (コーラン經), in Sekai Seiten Zenshū 14–15 (Sacred Writings of the World), Tokyo: Sekai Seiten Zenshū Kankoukai. (translated from Rodwell's English version)
- Takahashi, Goro, et al. 1938, Sei Kōran Kyō (聖香蘭經), Tokyo: Sei Kōran Kyō Kankoukai.
- Okawa, Shumei, 1950, Kōran (古蘭), Tokyo: Iwasaki Shoten.
- Izutsu, Toshihiko, 1957, rev. 1964, Kōran (コーラン), 3 vol. Tokyo: Iwanami Shoten. (translated from Arabic)
- Fujimoto, Katsuji, et al. 1970, Kōran (コーラン), in Sekai no Meicho 15 (Masterpieces of the World), Tokyo: Chuokoron-Shinsha. (republished in 2002, in Chūkō Classics E6-7, 2 vol.)
- Mita, Ryoichi, 1972, Sei Kurān (聖クラーン), Tokyo: Japan Muslim Association; 2nd. ed. 1983, Sei Kuruān (聖クルアーン) (bilingual in Arabic and Japanese)
- Holy Quran with Japanese translation. Islam International Publications Limited.
- 2022, by Tokyo Camii

=== Javanese ===
- KH. Bisri Mustofa, Tafsir Al-Ibriz Li Ma`rifati Tafsiir Al-Qur'an Al-`Aziiz, Menara Kudus Publishing Agency, Rembang, Indonesia. (with Pegon script).
- Maulana Muhammad Ali, Qur'an Suci Jarwa Jawi, Darul Kutubil Islamiyah, Jakarta, Indonesia, 2001.

=== Kannada ===
- 1929 by Siddiq Dindar Chennabasaveswar.
- Divya Qur'an, Qur'an Majid, (An effort of six scholars: Mawlana Shah Abd al-Qadir, Mawlana Sayyid, Abu Raihan Ahmed Noori, Abd Allah Sahib, I'jaz al-Din and Shaikh Abdul Gaffar Sullia), 2 vol. Bangalore 1978, p. 1400.
- Pavitra Qur'an by Shaikh Abdul Gaffar Sullia.(online version available)
- Kannadadalli Qur'an Anuvada. The Quran translated to Kannada by Abdussalam Puthige.
- Qur'an Vyakhyana by Shaikh Abdul Gaffar Sullia
- Kannada Meaning of Holy Qur'an, Part 30 (Juz 'Amma) by Iqbal Soofi. (online version and)
- Sarala Quran: Surah Al Fatihah, Al-Baqarah, Aali Imran, An-Nisaa, Al-Maaidah, Al-An'aam, Al-Aaraf, Al Anfal, At-Tawbah, Yunus, Hud, Ar-Raad, Yusuf, Ibraheem and Al-Hijr by Iqbal Soofi. The web version also contains translation of all the 37 Surahs of last/30th part of Qur'an. Translation from Al-Fathiah to Ya-Sin is also published to the web. (it is an ongoing project, online edition)
- Holy Qur'an is a free Kannada Quran applet for Android smartphones / tablets. The original Arab pages are derived from http://tanzil.net and translated into Kannada transliteration by Muhammed Hamza Puttur, Umar Ibn Ahmed Madini, Ahmad SM and Abu Bakr Nazir Salafi reviewed 'PAVETHRA QURAN' Complete Kannada Meaning' (publisher: Salafi Publishing House Mangalore).
- "Pavithra Quran" Kannada translation quran: all quran (translator and publisher South karnataka salafi movement ® (SKSM) Mangalore 2016)
- Pavithra Qur'an - Translated by Muhammad Yusuf Sahib of Mangalore. Edited by M.P. Ibrahim Sahib of Manjeshwer.

=== Kashmiri ===
- 1887 By Muhammad Yahya Shah, first and partial Translation
- Qur'ān Majīḍ Te Tameuk Kashur Tafsīr, Mirwaiz Yusuf Shah.

=== Kazakh ===
- by Musa Bigiev, 1912, unpublished
- by Aqıt Ulimjiulı, lost
- by Sadwaqas Ghylmani, 1970s
- by Ğazez Aqıtulı & Maqaş Aqıtulı, 1990, Arabic script
- by Halife Altay, 1991
- by Ratbek Nysanbayev, 1991
- by Nuralı Öserulı, 1991

=== Korean ===
- by Professor Uthman Kim Yong-Sun, 1971

=== Khasi ===
- Feb 2, 2019, by Seng Bhalang Islam

=== Khmer ===
- 2011, by unknown
- 2016, by H.E. Zakaryya Adam

=== Kurdish ===
==== Central Kurdish ====
- Nami Tafsir by Abdul Karim Mudarris, 1987.
- Hazhar Translation of Holy Quran by Hazhar, 1989.
- Asan by Burhan Muhammad Amin, 2004.
- Raman by Ahmed Kaka Mahmood, 2005.
- Tawhid by Abdul Qadid Tawhidi, 2014.
- Puxta Translation by Muhammad Mula Saleh Bamoki, 2015.
- Reber Kurdish Tafsir by Salahadin Abdul Karim, 2018.
- Peshang translation of Quran by Anwar Aziz Koye, 2018.

==== Northern Kurdish ====
- Tefsîra Şîrîn by Mula Muhammad Shirine Nivili, 1980.
- Qurana Pîroz û Arşa Wê ya Bilind by Abdullah Varli, 1994.
- تەفسیرا ژیان by Ismail Sgeri, 2001.
- Meala Fîrûz Şerha Qur’ana Pîroz by Mula Muhammad Garsi Farqini, 2003.
- Ronahîya Qur’ana Pîroz by Mula Muhammad Hakari, 2007.
- تەفسیرا ساناهی by Tahsin Ibrahim Doski, 2008.
- Qur’ana pîroz Kurdî by Tenvir Neshriyat, 2009.
- Nura Qelban by Muhammad Shoshki, 2010.
- Qur’ana Kerîm û meala wêya Kurdî by Fikri Amedi, 2014.

=== Khowar/Chitrali ===
- Qari Syed Bazurg Shah Al-Azhari (Sitara Imtiaz) in the early 1990s.

=== Korean ===
- 꾸란 한국어 의미 번역 by Ahmad Seo Hoseok, 2009.
- 성 꾸란 의미의 한국어 번역 by Hamid Choi, 2021.

=== Latin ===
- First translation (1141–1143) under the auspices of Peter the Venerable, made by a group led by Robert of Ketton (or Roberto Ketenese, or Robertus Retenensis), known as the Lex Mahumet pseudoprophete; later criticized for its partiality towards the Catholic church.
- Second translation (c. 1193–1216) by Mark of Toledo, regarded as a noticeable improvement.
- First printing (Bibliander) of the Lex Mahumet pseudoprophete made in Bâle (1543), during the Protestant Reformation. Machumetis Saracenorum Principis, eiusque successorum vitae, ac doctrina, ipseqve Alcoran: quo uelut authentico legum diuinarum codice Agareni & Turcae, alijq[ue] Christo aduersantes populi regu[n]tur, quae ante annos CCCC ... D. Petrus Abbas Cluniacensis per uiros eruditos ... ex Arabica lingua in Latinam transferri curauit: his adiunctae sunt confutationes multorum, & quidem probatissimorum authorum, Arabum, Graecorum, & Latinorum, unà cum ... Philippi Melanchthonis praemonitione ... : adiunctae sunt etiam, Turcaru[m] ... res gestae maximè memorabiles, à DCCCC annis ad nostra usuq[ue] tempora: haec omnia in unum uolumen redacta sunt, 1543, I. Oporinus, Basileae.
- Third translation from Arabic 1691–1698, by Ludovico Marracci (Padua).
- First ever published Quraan in Latin Words One to One (2022) by Maqsood Ahmad Naseem with ISBN 9783982499109

=== Lao ===
- Unknown, by Lao Muslim Association

=== Macedonian ===
- Hasan Džilo, 1997, Курʼан со превод ("the Qurʼan with a Translation"), King Fahd Complex for the Printing of the Holy Quran (Medina, Saudi Arabia).
- Elena Trenčevska–Čekoviḱ, Mersiha Smailoviḱ, Jasmin Redžepi, 2011, Превод на значењето на Благородниот Куран ("Translation of the meaning of the Noble Qurʼan"), ArtBooks (Skopje, North Macedonia) (ISBN 978-9989-190-49-0).

=== Madura ===
- Translation by Jamaah Pengajian Surabaya (JPS) led by K.H. Sattar.

=== Malayalam ===
- Visudha Quran Vivaranam: Translation and commentary by Mohammed Amani Moulavi
- Cheriyamundam Abdul Hameed Madani and Kunhi Mohammed Parappoor with online links.
- 'Albayan Fee Ma’anil Quran' by Sayyid Ahmed Shihabuddeen Imbichikkoya Thangal, former Chief Qazi of Kozhikode.
- 'Fathahu-rahman Fee Thafseeril Quran’ by KV Muhammed Musliyar Koottanad, former Joint Secretary of Samastha Kerala Jamiyyathul Ulama
- Tafheem ul Quran by Abul Aála Maudoodi with online links.
- Quran Lalitha Saram Translation By Sheik Muhammed Karakunnu and Vanidas Elayavur.
- Quran Bodhanam By TK Ubaid.
- Translation by Muttanisseri Koyakutty Maulavi.
- Translation by K. Abdul Rahiman and P.A. Karim and K.A. Raoof (D.C. Books).
- Translation by Adonne Publishing Group, Thiruvananthapuram.
- Translation by Current Books Kottayam.
- Translation by Rahmathullah Qasimi
- Translated by Muhammad Abul Wafa Sahib (Marhoom) of Kozhikode. Edited by Moulvi Muhammad Ismail Saheb of Aleppey and some distinguished Quran Scholars.
- Quran Akam Porul, Translated by C. H. Mohammed Mustafa Moulavi

=== Maldivian ===
- Quran Tharujamaa by Shaikh Abu Bakr Ibrahim Ali. This is the first translation in Maldivian.

=== Mandar ===
- Translation by Muh. Idham Kholid Budi in 2005 available online.

=== Mande ===
- Souleymane Kante
- Moulana Abul A'la Moudoodhi

=== Manipuri/Meitei ===
- 1991, by Ahmad Hasan Manipuri From English.
- Manipuri translation of Holy Quran by Tauheed Foundation in Bengali and Latin script.

=== Marathi ===
- 2014, by Maulana Abdul Karim parekh
- 1990, By Muhammad Abdur Rahim Dalvi.

=== Marwari ===
- 2015, by Rajeev Sharma

=== Mizo ===
- Unknown Translator,

=== Nepali ===
- 1982 by Gokul Sinha, First and Complete translation was by non-muslim. It was based multiple commentaries of different Islamic Scholars like English (Marmaduke Pickthall & Abdullah Yusuf Ali), Urdu (Maududi) & Hindi(Faruq Khan). Later, with tiny adjustment of Imam Sibaghatullah of Kalimpong Jama Masjid perfect it.

=== Norwegian ===
- Einar Berg, Universitetsforlaget, 1980. (ISBN 82-00-05371-7).

=== Odia ===
- 1951, by Moulavi Shaikh Mansur. It was first published(Korānara āloka) by himself in cuttack. It is believed to be a liberal translation & elucidation of Quran. The intro had biography of Prof. Muhammad and short account of Islam.
- 1989, by Abdul Qadir Khan and Muhammad Anwarul Haque.
- 1998, by Dr. Riazul Haque. It was published by Oriya Islamic Sahitya Prakashani, Cuttack.
- 2021, by Shakeel Ahmed

=== Pahari ===
==== Pakistan ====
- Translation of Haji Habib-ur-Rehman and Molvi Ghulam Qadir Khan.

=== Pashto ===
There are numerous translations of the Qur'an in Pashto. Some of the most famous are listed below:

- Mawlana Muhammad Ilyas (Akhunzada): The most first translation of Quran as well as Fakhr-ut-Tafseer was written by him in the 18th century in Afghanistan (original versions are placed in Kandahar), He then came to Peshawar (warsak road mathra kochian) & wrote many more Islamic books as well as search prescription of different kind of diseases, he was a Mowlana as well as a complete doctor & chemist.
- Fakhr-ut-Tafaaseer and Mukhzin-ut-Tafeer by Muhammad Ilyas Akhunzada Peshawari Kochiani is considered one of the famous Tafseers of the Quran in Pashto.
- 1861, by Muhammad Fathullah Khan Kandahari's translation: Printed in the 18th century, Bhopal, India, Translates the Quran in Pashto. It was translated from Shah Abdul Qadar Dehlavi's Urdu translation of the Quran. The hand-written versions of this translation are saved in Raza library of Rampur and Idara-e-Adabyat-e-Urdu library of Deccan, Hyderabad, India.
- Tafseer Yaseer by Mulavi Murad Ali Khan Sahibzada, it was the first Tafseer and second translation in Pashto. The first volume of this Tafseer was completed in 1912 and the second in 1917 It was the most famous Tafseer of its time. Murad Ali Sahebzada was born in 1223 H.q. He studied the traditional subjects of that time like Sarf, Nahwa, Hekmat, Fiqh & Meerath, Tafseer, Hadith, Uruz and Literature and he was also the Hafiz of the Quran. He was a good writer, author, teacher, and Poet of his time. His son Mohammad Sahebzada writes about him "He has written unlimited number of poems in Pashto, Dari, Arabic and Hindi. Writing poem was such easy for him, that he won't feel any difference between poem and prose. He has written a lot of Ghazals on Monotheism and Wisdom. His handwriting was very good and quick." <Akser Al Qoloub></Mohammad Sahibzadah.
- Mawlana Abdullah and Mawlana Abdul Aziz: It is a translation of the Tafseer of Abdul Haq Darbangawi and Wa'iz Kashifi. Translated by Abdullah and Abdul Aziz, it was printed in 1930 in Mumbai, India.
- Din Muhammad Khan: It is a word by word translation of the Quran printed in early years.
- Janbaz Sarfaraz Khan: It is printed in early years and is considered of the famous translation.
- Aziz-ut-Tafaaseer by Mulavi Sultan Aziz Khan.
- Mulavi Farooq Khan Ghalzi: It is a Pashto translation of the Quran printed in early years.

=== Persian ===
There are more than 60 complete translations of Qur'an in Persian and many partial translations. In the past some Tafsirs which had included Qur'an were translated like translation of Tafsir al-Tabari in 10 CE.

- Salman the Persian (7th century) (partial translation)
- Qur'an Quds, translator unknown – (before the 10th century)
- A translation in 556 AH
- Saiyad Makhdoom Ashraf Jahangir Simnani (1308–1405 CE), Original Manuscript at Mukhtar Ashraf Library in Kichoucha Shareef (U.P.)
- Shah Waliullah (1703–1762)
- Abd al-Aziz Dehlawi, Tafsir 'Azizi
- Mahdi Elahi-Ghomshei (مهدی الهی‌قمشه‌ای).
- Mahdi Fouladvand (مهدی فولادوند), available online.
- Naser Makarem Shirazi (ناصر مكارم‌شيرازی), translation includes his inline tafsir within parenthesis.
- Malik Fahd Council, Sunni branch.
- Ghodratollah Bakhtiarinejad (قدرت الله بختياری نژاد), available online.
- Tahere Saffarzadeh, translated Qur'an in Persian and English (Bilingual) in 2001.

=== Polish ===
- Jan Murza Tarak Buczacki.
- Józef Bielawski.
- Jarosław Surdel, 2011, ISBN 978-1-59784-501-4.
- Musa Çaxarxan Czachorowski, Polish Tatar, Sunni. Koran, First edition, Bialystok 2018, ISBN 9788365802088; Second edition, Warszawa 2020, ISBN 9788395798801, Third edition (bilingual), Bialystok 2021, ISBN 978-83-65802-36-1), First Turkish edition (bilingual), Ankara 2022, ISBN 978-625-435-338-3; Second Turkish edition, Ankara 2022 (ISBN 978-625-435-337-6), Fourth edition, Warszawa 2025, ISBN 978-83-972574-0-5.
- Rafał Berger, Shia Muslim, Koran, Bydgoszcz 2021, ISBN 978-83-947993-7-3.

=== Portuguese ===
- Bento de Castro, Alcorão / Muhamad. Lourenço Marques (Moçambique), Oficinas Gráficas de J. A. Carvalho, 1964.
- Américo de Carvalho, Alcorão. Mem Martins, Publicações Europa-América, 1978.
- José Pedro Machado, Alcorão. Lisboa, Junta de Investigações Científicas do Ultramar, 1979.
- M. Yiossuf Mohamed Adamgy, Alcorão Sagrado. Loures, Al Furqán, 1991, edição bilíngüe (árabe/português).
- Samir El Hayek, O Significado dos Versículos do Alcorão Sagrado. São Paulo, Ed. Marsam, 1994. [1ª ed. 1974].
- Helmi Nasr, Tradução do Sentido do Nobre Alcorão. Medina (Arábia Saudita), Complexo de Impressão do Rei Fahd, 2005 (1426 A.H.), edição bilíngüe (árabe/português).
- Mansour Challita, O Alcorão – Livro Sagrado do Islã. Rio de Janeiro, Ed. Record, 2013.
- Aminuddin Mohamed, Interpretação do Significado dos Versículos do Nobre Al-qurÁn. Maputo (Moçambique), IDM Publications, 2022.

=== Punjabi ===
- 1908, By Abd al-.Aziz, Mawlawi, Tafsir 'Azizi, Lahore.
- 1911, By Sant Vaidya Gurdit Singh Alomhari. It was first translation of the Quran into Punjabi, written in the Gurmukhi script, was published in April 1911. It was a collaborative effort led by a Sikh saint from the Nirmala sect, Sant Vaidya Gurdit Singh Alomhari, with funding from two Hindus and printed by the Shri Gurmat Press in Amritsar.

。Gurmukhi script

- Muhamad Habib and Bhai Harpreet Singh, 2017
- Arif Halim, Tafsir Ahsan ul Kalam, 2015

。Shahmukhi script

- Taquir Aman Khan, 2012

=== Romanian ===
- Silvestru Octavian Isopescul, Coranul, 1912 (first edition)
- Islamic and Cultural League of Romania, Traducerea Sensurilor Coranului Cel Sfânt în Limba Română, 1997 (first edition)
- George Grigore, Coranul, 2000 (first edition)
- Mustafa Ali Mehmed, Coran: Ultima Carte Sfântă, 2003 (first edition)

=== Rohingya ===
- 9-2025,by Unknown

=== Romani ===
- Muharem Serbezovski is known as a singer in North Macedonia and Bosnia and Herzegovina where he issued his translation.

=== Russian ===
- P. V. Postnikov.
- M. I. Veryovkin.
- A. V. Kolmakov.
- K. Nikolayev.
- D. N. Boguslavsky.
- G. S. Sablukov.
- I. Yu. Krachkovsky.
- T. A. Shumovsky.
- B. Y. Shidfar.
- M.-N. O. Osmanov.
- V. M. Porokhova.
- E. R. Kuliev.
- Sh. R. Alyautdinov
- Nazim Zeynalov, Russian Islamologist. This translation in 2015 is the first Shia translation of the Holy Quran into Russian. He won the Islamic Republic of Iran's Book of the Year Award.

=== Sanskrit ===
- Rahul Sankrityan, India (1945).
- Prof. Satya Dev Verma, Rajasthan, India (1984).
- Razia Sultana of Deoband, India (2010).
- Pandit Ghulam Dastgir Gazi, Maharastra, India (2015).
- Prof. Rampriya Sharma of Bihar, India (2022).

=== Saraiki ===
There are more than twenty translations of Quran in Saraiki.

- Hafizur Rahman, in the 1930s
- Meher Abdul Haq.
- Prof. Dilshad Klanchvi, in the 2000. Published by Ibn-e-Kaleem titled as SAUKH-E-SARAIKI TARJAMAY WALA QURAN SHAREEF
- Riaz Shahid.
- Sadeeque Shakir.
- G. R. Sevra.
- Tahir Khakwani, complete video translation in Saraiki.

=== Serbian ===
- Mićo Ljubibratić: Koran. Translated from French (Albert Kazimirski de Biberstein, 1840). Beograd, 1895, Sarajevo, 1990 (reprint), 2016.

=== Sindhi ===
- According to Sindhi tradition the first translation was made by in 270/883 by an Arab scholar. This one might be the same as the one mentioned above. The first extant Sindhi translation was done by Akhund Aziz ulllah Muttalawi (1160-1240/1747-1824) and first published in Gujarat in 1870. The first to appear in print was by Muhammad Siddiq (Lahore 1867).
- First ever translation of Quran to any other language was in Sindhi by Imam Abul Hassan bin Mohammad Sadiq Al-Sindhi Al-Madni.
- Maulana Abdul Waheed Jan Sirhindi, a contemporary scholar and writer of Sunni Islam.
- Allama Ali Khan Abro, wrote Sindhi translation of Quran and intended to give the Qur'an a practical contemporary interpretation also wrote separate translation for non-Muslims from the request of Sindh's great freedom fighter Maulana Taj Mohammad Amrothi.
- Allama Makhdoom Muhammad Hashim Thattvi
- Maulana Ghullam Mustafa Qasmi's Sindhi Translation of the Quran.
- Maulvi Ahmad Mallah's poetic Sindhi Translation of the Quran.
- Maulana Abdul Karim Qureshi of Bair Shareef District Kambar Shahdadkot- Sindhi Translation of the Quran.
- Maulana Taj Mohammad Amroti's Sindhi Translation of the Quran.
- Amir Bakhsh Channa's Sindhi Translation of the Quran.
- Mufti Muhammad Raheem Sikandri resident of Pir jo Goth Dargah Shareef Pagara Sindh,
- [Molana Abdul Salam soomro Advocate (from Khanpur District Shikarpur) Sindhi Translation of the Quran word by word in first time, published by sindhica Academy, Karachi, in year 2017. and second publication was made in 2018 with translation of molana taj Mohammad Amroti it is called dual translation of the holy Quran
- "سنڌسلامت پيغامِ قرآن - ترجمو - مولانا عبدالسلام سومرو ايڊووڪيٽ". quran.sindhsalamat.com.
- an with exegesis
- Al Asheik Zafrulla Bahji,

Al Asheik Salsabil, Al Hafiz Al Alim M.S.M Yunus, H.M.M Saleem Jem, Ajmal Rafeek, 2019.

(ISBN 978-9-38658-916-3)

=== Spanish ===
- Anonymous morisco's translation, made in 1606, published in 2001 by Reial Acadèmia de Bones Lletres de Barcelona.
- Joaquín García Bravo, El Corán (1907), translated from French Kasimirski's edition, widely republished.
- Rafael Cansinos-Asséns, an Argentinian writer, poet, literary critic, and also prolific translator (with a complete version of One Thousand and One Nights among his works), El Korán, published in Buenos Aires (1951), with a foreword, a Life of Muhammad ("Mahoma", in Spanish), and notes.
- Ahmed Abboud and Rafael Castellanos, two converts to Islam of Argentine origin, published El Sagrado Coran (El Nilo, Buenos Aires, Argentina, 1953).
- Julio Cortes translation El Coran, made in 1979, is widely available in North America, being published by New York-based Tahrike Tarsile Qur'an publishing house.
- El Sagrado Corán, translated by Antonio Carrillo Robles and published in 1988 by the Ahmadiyya Muslim Community (considered heretic by orthodox Muslims) in Córdoba, Spain.
- Kamal Mustafa Hallak's fine deluxe Hardback print, El Coran Sagrado, is printed in 1997 by Maryland-based Amana Publications.
- Abdel Ghani Melara Navio, a Spaniard who converted to Islam in 1979, his Traduccion-Comentario Del Noble Coran was originally published by Darussalam Publications, Riyadh, in December 1997. The King Fahd Printing Complex has their own version of this translation, with editing by Omar Kaddoura and Isa Amer Quevedo.
- Juan Vernet, an important Spanish Arabist and scholar who also translated a selection of One Thousand and One Nights stories. El Corán: Plaza & Janés, Barcelona, Spain, 2001.

=== Sundanese ===
- Tafsir Al-Foerqan Basa Sunda by A. Hassan, 1937.
- Nurul-Bajan: Tafsir Qur’an Basa Sunda by H. Mhd. Romli and H.N.S. Midjaja, 1960.
- Al-Amin: Al-Qur’an Tarjamah Sunda by K.H. Qamaruddin Shaleh, H.A.A. Dahlan, and Yus Rusamsi, 1971.
- Translation and commentary by K.H. Anwar Musaddad, K.H. Mhd. Romli, K.H. Hambali Ahmad, K.H.I. Zainuddin, K. Moh. Salmon et al., 1978.
- Tafsir Ayat Suci Lenyepaneun by Moh. E. Hasim, 1984.
- Nur Hidayah: Saritilawah Basa Sunda in Sundanese poem by H.R. Hidayat Surayalaga, 1994.
- Al-Munir: Al-Qur’an Tarjamah Basa Sunda by H.M. Djawad Dahlan, 2005.

=== Swahili ===
At least 7 complete translations in Swahili have appeared and dozens of partial translations.

- Tafsiri ya Kurani ya Kiarabu kwa lugha ya Kiswahili pamoja na Dibaji na maelezo Machache by Godfrey Dale, 1923
- Kurani Tukufu by Mubarak Ahmad Ahmadi, 1953
- Qur' ani Takatifu by Abdallah Saleh al-Farsy, 1969
- Tarjama ya al-muntakhab katika tafsiri ya Qur' ani tukufu by Ali Muhsin Al-Barwani, 1995
- Kitabu kinachobainisha by Ali Juma Mayunga, 2003
- Asili ya Uongofu by Said Moosa al-Kindy, 1992–2013 (final volume expected 2014)
- Al-Kashif by Muhammad Jawad Mughniyya translated in Swahili by Hasan Mwalupa

=== Swedish ===
- Carl Johan Tornberg, 1875.
- Karl Vilhelm Zetterstéen, 1917.
- Mohammed Knut Bernström

=== Tamil ===
- Iqbal Madani
- A.K. Abdhul Hameed Bakavi, 1929, Madras
- K.A. Nizamudeen Manbavee
- Moulavi P. Jainulabdeen Ulavi
- Mohamed Rifash
- Pambana Mustaff

=== Tatar ===
- Musa Bigiev

=== Telugu ===
- 1925, by Sri Chilukuri Narayana Rao
- 2010, by Abdul-Raheem Mohammed Moulana "Divya Quran Sandesham"
- Divya Quran by Janab Hamidullah Sharief Saheb first translator of Telugu Quran
- Bhavamrutam by Janab Aburl Irfan Saheb
- Quran Avagahanam by Janab S M Mallick Saheb. This is a translation of Tafheemul Quran by Maulana Sayyed AbulAla Maudoodi
- 1945, The Holy Quran In Telugu With Notes By Muhammad Qasim Khan Volume - I & II, Intellectual, Author, An Expanatory Translation of the Holy Quran in Teleugu With Notes Published by Hyderabad Teleugu Academy in 1945
- Comparative Studies on Religion - Islam- Christianity- Hinduism By Muhammad Qasim Khan Volume - III
- Article on Islam in Sub Continent: Telugu Translation of Holy Quran
- 2021, by Fazale Kareem

=== Thai ===
- 1968, by King Bhumibol Adulyadej
- King Fahad Quran Complex
- 2009, Abu Israfil al-Fatani
- 2021, Ameen Binkason (GoodWord Books, 2020 ISBN 978-8-19436-633-1)

=== Turkish ===
Over fifty translations of the Koran have appeared in Turkish. Although it has been claimed that the Koran was first translated into Turkish on the instructions of Kemal Atatürk, other sources claim that Turkish translations have existed since the beginning of the Muslim era

- Sheikh Al-Fadl Mohamed Ben Idriss.
- Tafsir al-Tibyiin, 1842, Cairo.
- Ahmad b. 'Abd Allah, 1875, Tafsir-e zubdat al-athar, 2 vol. Istanbul 1292-1294/1875-77, p. 448+464.
- Ibrahim Hilmi, 1913 Terjumat el Koran, Istanbul
- Elmalılı Muhammed Hamdi Yazır, 1935, Hakk Dīni Kur'an Dili yeni mealli Türkçe tafsir, 9 vol. Istanbul 1935–1938\ 9 vol. 2nd ed. Istanbul 1960–1962, p. 6632+229\ 9 vol. 3rd ed. Istanbul 1970, p. 6432+229.
- Ömer Rıza Doğrul, 1943-1955/1980, Tanrı Buyruğu: Kur’ân-ı Kerîm’in Tercüme ve Tefsiri, İstanbul 1943, 1947, 1955, 1980
- Syed Mahmood Tarazi Al Madani Bin Syed Nazir Trazi (D:1991) translated Qur'an in Turkistani (Chag'atay Uzbek) in 1956, (First Published: 1956 Bombay )
- Abdülbâki Gölpınarlı, 1955, Istanbul 1968, p. 688\ 2 vol. Istanbul 1955, p. (38l)+(381 +Cxxxviii)
- Huseyin Atay and Yasar Kutluay, 1961, 3 vol. Ankara 1961, p. 32+814+7\ 1 vol. 5th ed. Ankara: Diyanet isleri Baskanligi (The Turkish Presidency of Religious Affairs), 1980, p. 34+604
- Süleyman Ateş, 1975, 1st ed. Istanbul 1975. p. 592\ Ankara: KilicKitabevi 1977, p. 2+604+3+xxx
- Ali Bulaç, 1985, Istanbul: Birim 1985, p. xxxviii+605.
- Yaşar Nuri Öztürk, 1993.
- Ömer Öngüt, 1998, Kur'an-ı Kerim ve Türkçe Meâl-i Âlisi, Istanbul: Hakikat Yayıncılık, 604 s.
- Edip Yüksel, 2000, Mesaj Kuran Çevirisi, (ISBN 975-7891-31-2).
- Ahmed Hulusi, 2009, Allâh İlminden Yansımalarla KUR'ÂN-I KERÎM ÇÖZÜMÜ (The Key to the Quran)
- Hakkı Yılmaz, 2012, NÜZUL SIRASINA GÖRE NECM NECM KUR'AN MEALİ

=== Tajik ===
- From Maktabat Al Mujaddadiyah
- Sheikh Khoja Mirov Khoja Mir

=== Tibetan ===
- XXXX, by Unknown

=== Ukrainian ===
- Mykhaylo Yakubovych, Preslavnyj Koran: pereklad smysliv Ukrajns'koju movoju, 2012.

=== Urdu ===
- Kanzul Iman by Ahmad Raza Khan Barelvi.
- Tazkirul Quran by Wahiduddin Khan (1985)
- Noor Ul Irfan by Ahmad Yar Khan Naeemi
- Shah Abdul Qadir Dehlvi, Muzihul-al-Quran, 1829
- Nazeer Ahmad Dehlvi, Tarjuma-i Qur’an, 1896
- Anwaar-Al-Quran by Zeeshan Haider Jawadi. First edition published in 1990 by Tanzeem-Al-Makatib, Golaganj, Lucknow, Uttar Pradesh, India.
- Hafiz Syed Farman Ali Qibla Published by Nizami Prees, Chandanpatti, Darbhanga, Bihar.India
- Syed Ahmed Saeed Kazmi, Al-Bayan.
- Sayyid Abul Ala Maududi, Tafheem-ul-Quran (6 Vols).
- Israr Ahmed. Bayan-ul-Quran
- Al-Bayan by Javed Ahmad Ghamidi, Publisher : Al Bayan (January 1, 2017)
- Ameen Ahsan Islahi, Tadabbur-i-Qur'an (9 Vols), 1961.
- Bayan al-Quran by Ashraf Ali Thanwi
- Muhammad Junagarhi, Ahsan ul Bayan
- Fateh Muhammad Jalandhari.
- Taqi Usmani, Asan Tarjuma e Quran, with explanatory notes, 2009
- S.M. Afzal Rahman, "Taleem-ul-Quran", 2001.
- Abul Kalam Azad, Tarjuman-Al-Quran (Four Volumes), 1930-1936
- Shabbir Ahmad Usmani, Tafseer-e-Usmani
- Yusuf Motala "Idhwaa-ul-Bayaan"
- Ameer Muhammad Akram Awan, Akram ut Tarajim, published by Qudratullah company, 2011.

Following translations are known to exist, but need more information, such as publisher, title, year of publication etc.

- Aashiq Ilahi Meeruti, Tarjama Quran.
- Translation By Majils-e-Fikr o Nazar-Matalib-ul-Quraan.
- Hakeem Yaseen Shah.
- Mufti Imdadullah Anwar.
- Muhammad Din Peshaweri Taleem ul Quran a word to word and idiomatic rendering of the Holy Quran. 2000.
- Mahmood Hassan.
- Abdur-Raoof, Ferozsons Publishers.
- Abdul Bari, Hederabadi Daccni, India.
- Sufi Abdul Hameed Sawati.
- Ishaaq Kashmeri (Dubai) Zubdatul-Quraan.
- Abdul Majjid Daryabadi, India.
- Aashiq Illahi Merathi, India.
- Ahmad Ali Lahori.
- Hamid Hasan Bilgarami, Fayuz ul Quraan 2 Vols.
- Abdul Kareem Pareekh, India.
- Aashiq Illahi Bulandshaheri.
- Abu Haq Haqani Dehlvi.
- Shah Rafi al-Din.
- Shah 'Abd al-Qadir.
- Fatheh Mohammad Khan.
- Muhammad Ali (India).
- Maqbool Ahmed Dehlvi (Known as Maqbool).
- Allama Azad Subhani (1897–1964) wrote Tafsir e Rabbani Mukaddama
- Tahir ul Qadri, Irfan-ul-Quran.
- Khwaja mohsin Nizami in 1330
- Hajeem Ahmad Shajah and Maulana Abulhasnaat in Lahore
- Amin Mian in 1429
- Kanz ul-Irfan by Mufti Muhammad Qasim Attari (2022)

=== Uyghur ===
- Muhammed Saleh. Tanzil - Quran Navigator | القرآن الكريم

=== Vietnamese ===
- 1989, by Sa-id bin Aly bin Wahf Al-Qotony
- 2023, by Shaikh Hassan Abdul Karim

=== Yiddish ===
- Selected parts translated in 1987

=== Yoruba ===
- 1906 By M. S. Cole, first complete translation printed in Lagos.

== See also ==
- English translations of the Quran
- List of Ahmadi translations of the Quran
