= Quran translations into Hebrew =

The Quran is the central religious text of Islam, believed by Muslims to be a waḥy, a revelation from God.

Translation of the Quran into Hebrew was first completed in the mid-19th century.

== Background ==
The first translation of the Quran into Hebrew was completed in 1857 by Hermann Reckendorf, a German Jewish scholar from Leipzig.

== Translation in timeline ==
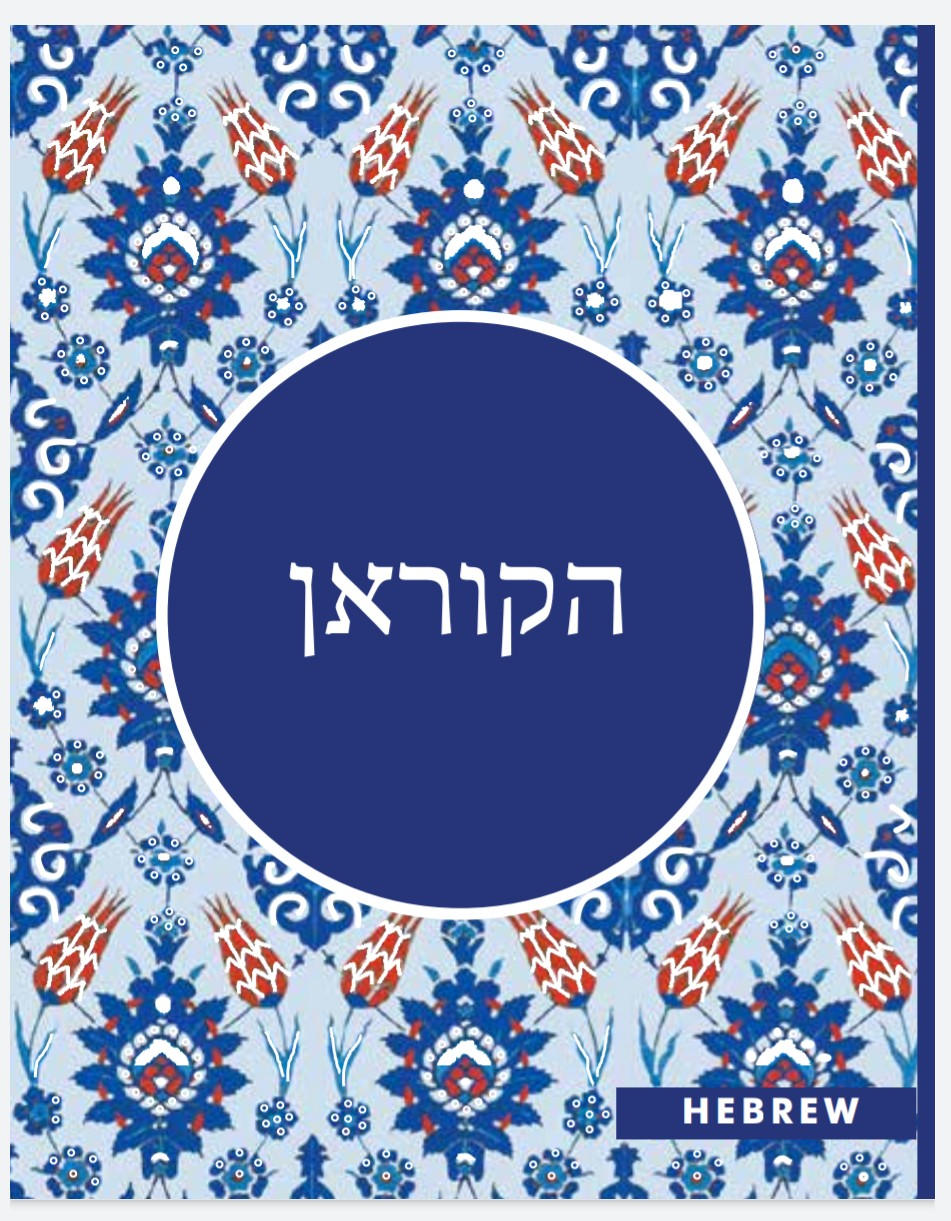
Hebrew Quran cover

=== In 19th century ===
- 1857: By Hermann Reckendorf of Leipzig.

=== In the 20th century ===
Later translations were in Modern Hebrew.

- 1936: A translation by Yosef Yoel Rivlin of Hebrew University of Jerusalem in Mandatory Palestine.
- 1971: Ha-Qurʾan ha-qadosh: sefer ha-sefarim shel ha-Iślam "The Holy Qurʼān: The Great Book of Islam" by Aharon Ben-Shemesh of Israel.

=== In 21st century ===
- 2005: A translation of the Quran was published by Uri Rubin, a professor at Tel Aviv University in Israel.
- 2015: Subhi Ali Adawi published a translation titled Ha Qoran Bi Lashoon Akher in Jordan.
- 2018: Asad Nimr Basul published Ha Qoran in Saudi Arabia, which became the subject of a viral misinformation story, implying that Saudi Arabia had mistranslated the Quran to appease Israeli interests.
- 2019: A translation was published digitally by Goodword books.
- 2023: Translations of the Quran were published in Egypt in three languages, including Hebrew. Ha-Qurʾan ha-Mefoʾar was published by the Ahmadiyyas and debuted at the annual Jalsa Salana in Kababir the same year in 2023.

== See also ==
- Islam
- Quran
- List of translations of the Quran
