= Waseem Ahmed =

Waseem Ahmed may refer to:

- Waseem Ahmed (cricketer) (born 1993), Indian cricketer
- Waseem Ahmed (artist) (born 1976), Pakistani artist
- Waseem Ahmed (field hockey) (born 1977), Pakistani field hockey player
- Wasim Ahmad, Indian politician
- Wasim Ahmed, Pakistani cricketer
