= Juan Gabriel of Teruel =

16th-century Spanish translator

- Born: Alí Alayzar mid-15th century Teruel, Kingdom of Aragon
- Died: early 16th century
- Other names: Iohannes Gabriel Terrolensis
- Occupation: Translator
- Years active: early 16th century
- Notable work: 1518 Latin translation of the Quran

Juan Gabriel of Teruel (also spelled Joan Gabriel; Latin name: Iohannes Gabriel Terrolensis; former Muslim name: Alí Alayzar) was a Spanish convert from Islam to Christianity known for translating the Quran into Latin during the early 16th century.

== Life ==
Juan Gabriel was born sometime during the mid-15th century, likely in Teruel. He may have been the Faqīh (Spanish: Alfaquí) of Teruel during the 15th century, but was likely forced to convert to Christianity in 1502 due to the forced conversions of Muslims in Spain.

He taught Arabic to Fray Joan Martí de Figuerola, a preacher who wrote that his knowledge of Arabic and the Quran was thanks to Juan Gabriel. Juan Gabriel died sometime during the early 16th century.

== Quran translation ==
In 1518, Juan Gabriel prepared a Latin translation of the Quran for Giles of Viterbo (Italian: Egidio da Viterbo), who had commissioned the translation for the purpose of converting Muslims to Christianity. Leo Africanus, a Muslim convert who was a godson of Giles of Viterbo, revised the translation in 1525. The original manuscript has not survived, although other surviving manuscripts of the translation are Cambridge MS Mm. v. 26 (C) and Milan MS D 100 inf. (M). MS D 100 Inf was copied by Scottish scholar David Colville in 1621, from a manuscript at the library of El Escorial in Spain. Colville later brought his manuscript to Milan. Today, it is archived at the Biblioteca Ambrosiana. A critical edition of the Latin Quran translation was published by Katarzyna K. Starczewska in 2018, which was a revision of her 2012 dissertation.

Below is Juan Gabriel's Latin translation of Al-Ikhlas, the 112th sura of the Quran.

1. Dic: "Est Deus unus,
2. Deus est potens,
3. non fuit generatus neque generabit,
4. et non ei aequalis cum eo."

== See also ==
- List of translations of the Quran
- Leo Africanus
- Mark of Toledo
- Ignazio Lomellini
- Robert of Ketton
- Ludovico Marracci
