= Ahmed Noori =

Indian writer and journalist

Ahmed Noori, aka Abu Raihan Ahmed Noori, was a prominent writer and journalist who belonged to the Beary community of Mangalore in Dakshina Kannada in South India.

He was born on 10 June 1920 and grew up in Mangalore but later on lived in Bangalore. He completed the Adeeb-e-Mahir in Urdu from the Jamia Urdu Aligarh. He wrote books in the local Beary bashe and Kannada languages. A second edition of his 1960 book, Maikala, a documentary about the culture Beary community of Mangalore in Kannada language, was published in 1997. He was part of a six-member team who, for the first time, translated the meaning of the Quran to Kannada language in 1978. He edited several periodicals such as "Sandesha", "Kitaab" and "The Message". He contributed extensively to the Sanmarga weekly Kannada magazine. In 2010, the Karnataka Beary Sahitya Academy awarded him an honorary award for 2009 for his literary achievements.

He has become a household name in the Beary community due to his popular songs and music composition. Some of his popular songs are ‘Kelanda Makkale Kelanda,’ ‘Ethare Tholo Varakro Masth,’ ‘Alam Padachadum Neenem, Adre Chameychedum Neeneme.’ In January 2011, a CD of Beary Bashe songs written by him was released in Bangalore.

Ahmed Noori died on 2 September 2012.

== Bibliography ==
=== Books ===
- Maikala (1960; 2nd ed. 1997)

=== Periodicals ===
- Sandesha
- Kitaab
- The Message

== See also ==
- List of translations of the Qur'an
