= Zohurul Hoque =

Indian Islamic scholar (1926–2017)

Dr. Zohurul Hoque
- জহুরুল হক
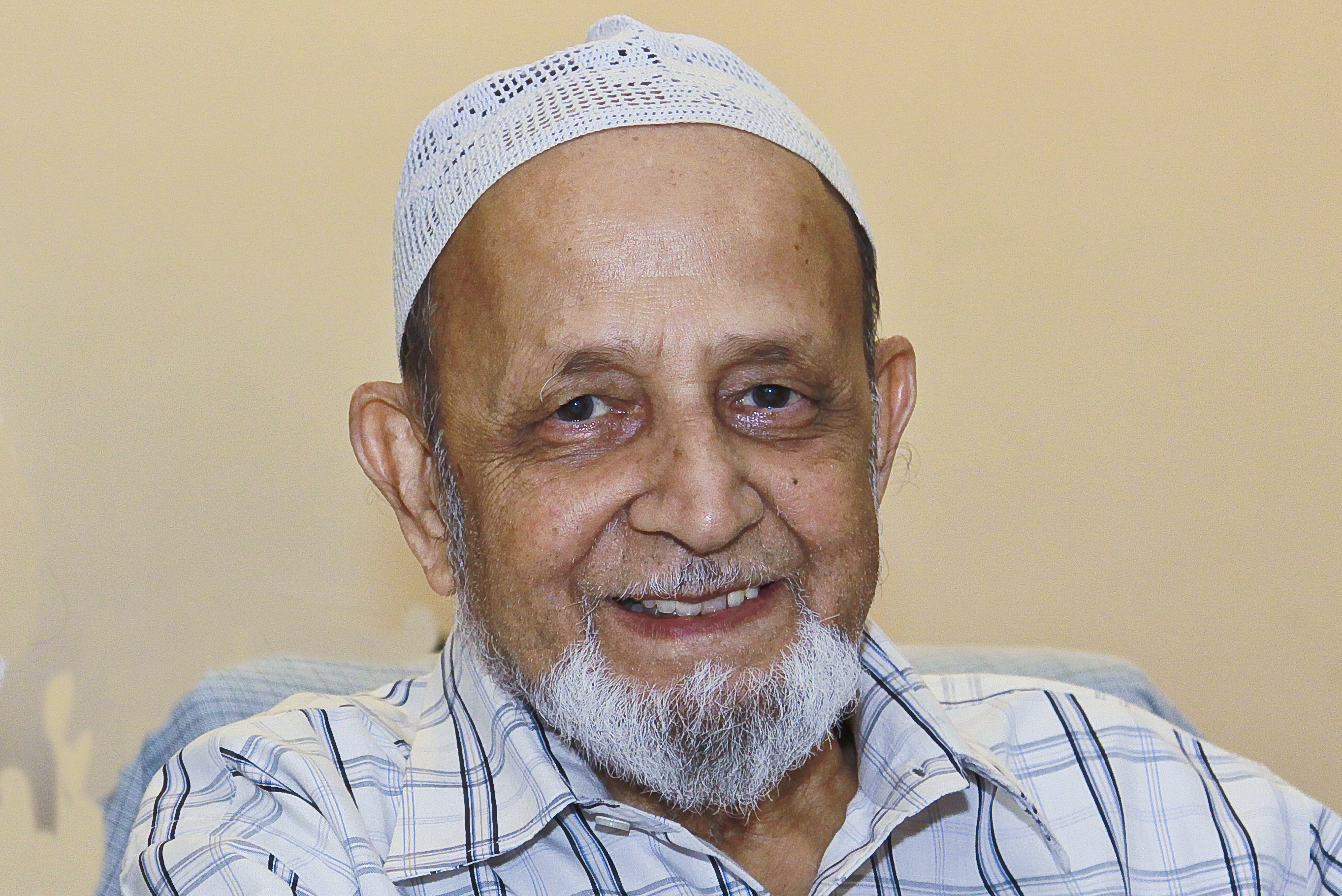

Personal life
- Born: 11 October 1926 Deubari, Assam Province, British India
- Died: 18 January 2017 (aged 90) Muscat, Oman
- Education: Assam Medical College; University of Michigan
- Occupation: Public Health

Religious life
- Religion: Islam
- Denomination: Sunni

Zohurul Hoque (Bengali: জ়হুরুল হক, Bengali pronunciation: [zoɦuɾul ɦok]; 11 October 1926 – 18 January 2017) was an Indian Islamic scholar and doctor known for his translations of the Qur'an into the Bengali, Assamese and English languages. He later moved to Muscat in Oman.

== Career ==
He published a Bengali translation of the Qur'an in 1986, after working on it for 12 years. He had started to work on an Assamese translation before the Bengali translation was complete. Hoque published the Assamese translation of The Quran in three volumes. He started work on an English translation in 1993. He published a book with more than 1250 pages titled Translation and Commentary on The Holy Quran on April 1, 2000. It was part of the Holy Quran Pub Project. The Assamese translation, published by Bina Library, Guwahati, Assam, is now in its sixth reprint. A new edition of his Bangla translation of the Quran has been published in June 2014.

== Death ==
He died in Muscat, Oman on 18 January 2017, and was buried at the Central Public Graveyard in Al Amarat.
