= Levon Larents =

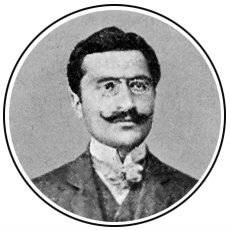
Levon Larents (Kirisciyan)

Levon Larents (Kirisciyan) (Armenian: Լեւոն Լարենց (Քիրիշճեան), 1875–1915) was an Armenian writer, translator, journalist, editor, novelist, poet, and teacher. He was an editor of many newspapers around the world and the founder of many others. During the Armenian genocide, Larents was deported to Ankara and then killed.

== Life ==
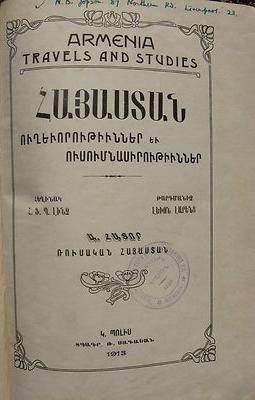
Larents' translation of H.F.B. Lynch's Armenia

Levon Larents was born in 1875 in the Samatya district of Istanbul, Ottoman Empire. He received his education at the local Robert College where he graduated in 1902. During his time as a student in Robert College, Larents along with classmates Yenovk Armen and Hrand Esayan published the Zepur Armenian periodical. For a brief period after his graduation, Larents was a contributor to the Puzantion newspaper. He then moved to Adapazarı where he taught 'The History of Civilization' at the local Armenian Getronagan School there.

In 1905, Larents went to the United States, escaping from societal pressure in the Ottoman Empire, where he became part of the reform movement of the Armenian Hunchak political party. While in Boston, Massachusetts, Larents became the editor of a local Armenian newspaper called Tsayn Hayreneats or "Voice of the Fatherland" for a period of two years. He eventually moved to Alexandria, Egypt when worked in Orosdi Back, a wholesale company. While in Alexandria, he also became a contributor to the Azad Pern local Armenian newspaper. However, after the death of Arpiar Arpiarian, Larents moved to Athens, Greece. After the Young Turk revolution in 1908, Larents returned to Constantinople where he became the chief-editor of Murj and Tsayn Hayreneats for two years. While in Constantinople, Larents published a book of poems entitled Trahkdi Yerker or "Songs of Heaven". He also translated numerous works from French and English into Armenian. One such work was a translation of H. F. B. Lynch's "Armenia" which was published in 1913. In 1911, he had also translated the Quran into Armenian.

== Death ==
Levon Larents was one of the Armenian leaders deported during the Armenian genocide. He was first deported to Ayaş along with other Armenian intellectuals. Larents was then transferred to Ankara where he was killed outside of the city.

== See also ==
- Armenian literature
- Ottoman Armenians
- Western Armenia
