= Ignazio Lomellini =

Jesuit priest from Genoa (1560–1645)

- Born: c. 1560; Genoa
- Died: 20 May 1645; Rome
- Occupation: Jesuit priest
- Known for: Translating the Quran into Latin
- Religion: Christianity
- Church: Roman Catholic Church
- Writings: Animadversiones, Notae ac Disputationes in Pestilentem Alcoranum (MS A-IV-4) (1622)

Ignazio Lomellini (born c. 1560 in Genoa, died 20 May 1645 in Rome) was a Genoese Jesuit priest. He was a member of the illustrious Lomellini noble family in Genoa.

Lomellini is known as the author of the little-known Animadversiones, Notae ac Disputationes in Pestilentem Alcoranum (MS A-IV-4), a 1622 manuscript that is the oldest surviving example of a European translation of the Quran which also includes the complete original Arabic text. The manuscript, written in Latin, was previously owned by Antoine Isaac Silvestre de Sacy and has been held at the University of Genoa library since 1846. Its rediscovery was noted by Giorgio Levi Della Vida in a 1947 article.

The manuscript's marginalia contain detailed verse-by-verse commentaries of the original Arabic text. At the time, the Latin translation, though not without problems, was the most accurate translation ever written in a European language. The manuscript was dedicated to Cardinal Alessandro Orsini.

Lomellini died on 20 May 1645 in Rome.

== See also ==
- List of translations of the Quran
- Mark of Toledo
- Robert of Ketton
- Ludovico Marracci
