= Józef Bielawski =

Polish Islamic scholar (1910–1997)

- Born: August 12, 1910
- Died: September 19, 1997 (aged 87); Warsaw, Poland
- Known for: Polish translation of the Qur'an

Academic background
- Education: Jagiellonian University

Academic work
- Discipline: Arabistics, Islamic studies
- Institutions: University of Warsaw

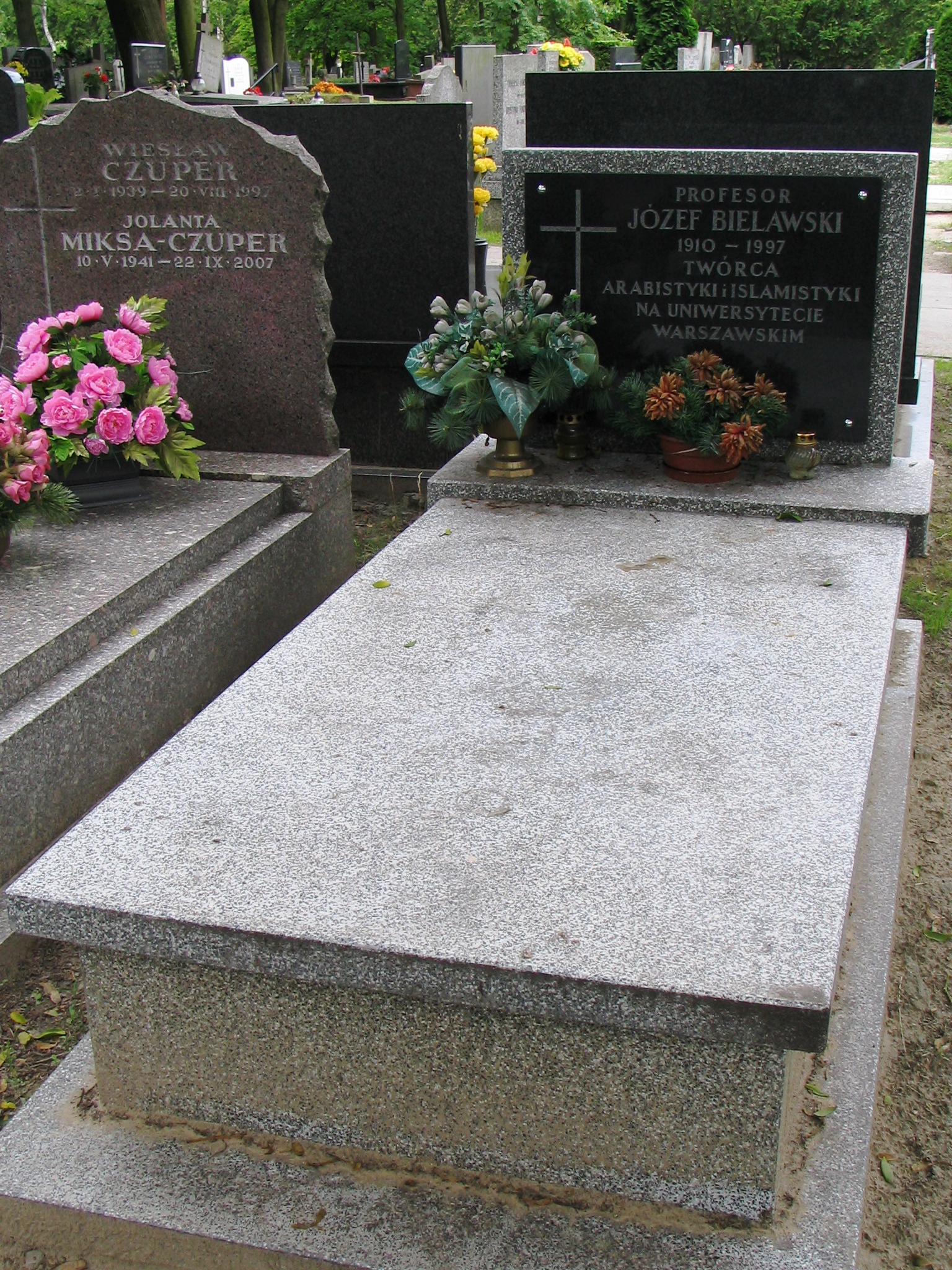
Grave of Bielawski at the Powązki cemetery in Warsaw

Józef Bielawski (August 12, 1910 – September 19, 1997) was a Polish Arabist and scholar of Islam.

A graduate of the Jagiellonian University, where he studied law as well as oriental languages. From 1948 to 1950, he was the cultural attaché of the Polish Embassy in Turkey. From 1968, he was a professor at the University of Warsaw, where he created the Arab and Islamic studies program. In 1979, he became a member of the Iraqi Academy of Sciences. He was a founding member of the Polish-Arab Friendship Association. He is also known for his translation of the Qur'an into Polish. He is also the author of many books relating to Islam and Arabian culture.
