= T. B. Irving =

Canadian-American Muslim author, translator of the Quran

Thomas Ballantyne Irving (1914–2002), also known as Al-Hajj Ta'lim Ali Abu Nasr, was a Canadian-American Muslim author, professor, activist and scholar who produced the first American English translation of the Qur'an.

== Early life and education ==
Irving was born in Preston, Ontario (now Cambridge) in 1914, the son of William Irving and Jessica McIntyre. He embraced Islam in the early 1950s and took the name Al-Hajj Ta'lim Ali Abu Nasr. He earned a B.A. in Modern Languages from the University of Toronto, and went on to obtain a master's degree from McGill University, and a PhD in Near Eastern Studies from Princeton University in 1940.

== Career ==
An accomplished scholar of linguistics and a writer, Irving was responsible for the first American English translation of the Qur'an, The Qur'an: First American Version, published in 1985. The work is an attempt to make the English translation of the Quran more readable to an audience not used to the old style of English common in most translations. Irving was particularly concerned about making the Quran accessible to Muslim youth in North America. As a scholar, Irving taught and studied at a number of leading universities in the U.S. and Canada, including McGill, Princeton, the University of Minnesota, and the University of Tennessee.

As an author, Irving wrote numerous books on Islam, including "Had You Been Born A Muslim", "Islam and Its Essence", "Islam Resurgent", and "Growing up in Islam". He also penned a small number of books in Spanish, including "Nacido como Musulman" and " Cautiverio Babilonico en Andalusia". He is the author of "Falcon of Spain."

T.B. Irving is considered a pioneer in Latino Dawah. He had presented many lectures to Latino Muslims about the history of Islam in Spain.

From 1981 to 1986, Irving served as the dean of the American Islamic College in Chicago. He was recognized for his service to Islam by the government of Pakistan in 1983 when he was awarded the Star of Excellence. During Dr. Irving's last years, his son, Nicholas, moved from Guatemala to take care of his father. He died on September 24, 2002, after a long struggle with Alzheimer's disease.
