= Mir Aneesuddin =

Dr. Mir Aneesuddin (died 30 October 2006 in Hyderabad, India), son of Mir Hasanuddin, was a geologist at Indian Institute of Chemical Technology (retired in 1996), President of Islamic Academy of Sciences (Hyderabad, India), an author and an orator. Aneesuddin was one of the first to research on Quran and science, his articles were published during the mid-1960s by Radiance Magazine of India. He also encouraged several young Muslims to reflect upon the verses of the Quran and has guided few articles on Quran & Science.

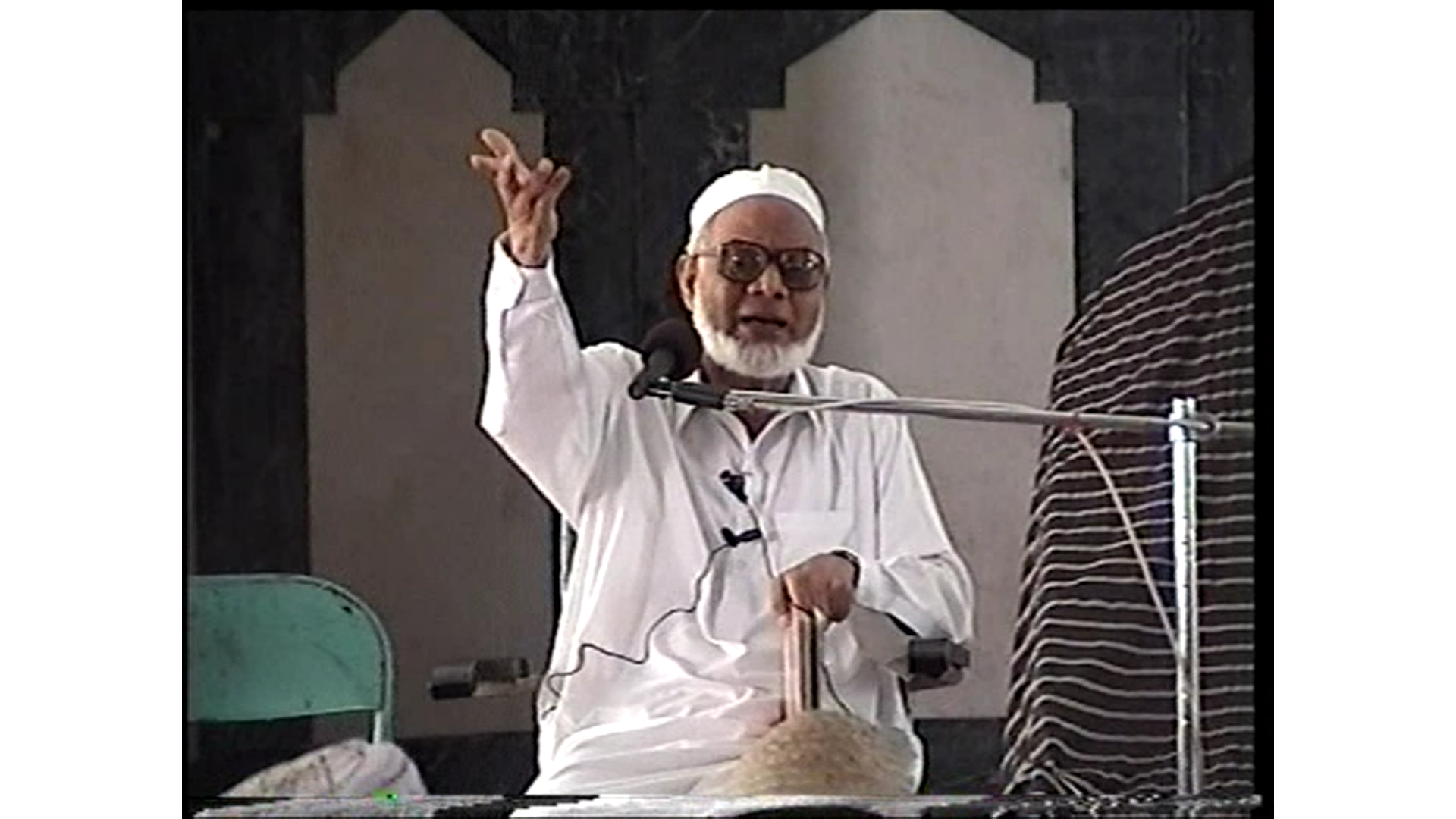
President Islamic Academy of Sciences

== Translation of the Quran ==
In 1993, Islamic Academy of Sciences published his Translation, A Simple Translation of The Holy Quran (with notes on Topics of Science). The Translation is widely accepted in India and attracts young readers in understanding the Holy Book. Second Edition of the Translation was published in 1995, while the Third Edition published in 2010 includes Summarized Commentary, Notes on Topics of Science and Subject Index. The Summarized Commentary was published by Quranic Resources on Scribd.

=== Urdu Commentary of the Quran ===
He used to conduct weekly sessions on Urdu Commentary (Tafsir) in Alia Mosque in Hyderabad, which was attended by one and all. These were recorded and are now available on various media from Islamic Academy of Sciences, Hyderabad. These lectures were published by Quranic Resources on SoundCloud.

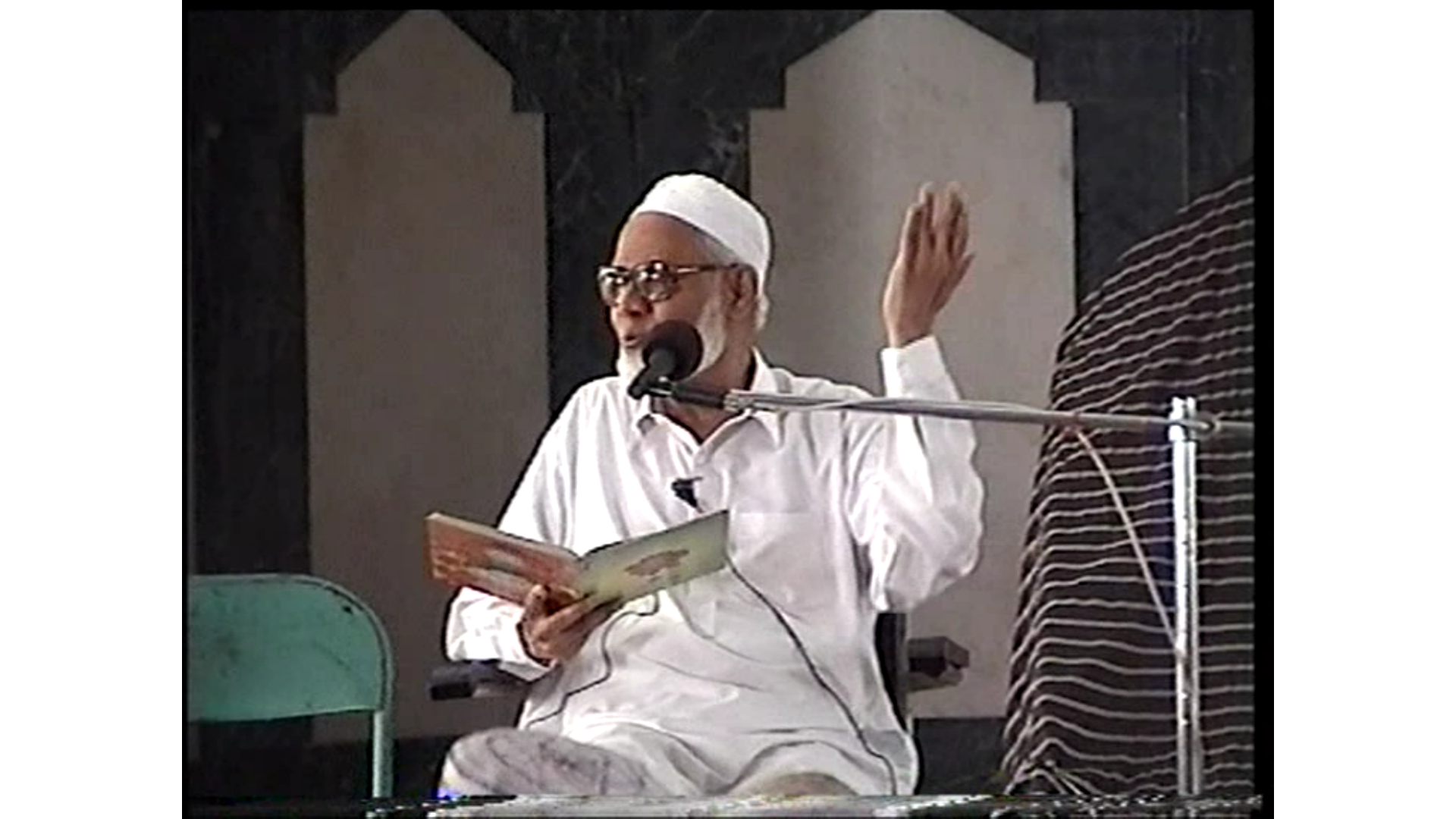
During one of the Quran Lectures delivered during his lifetime

== Books ==
=== The Quran, Science and the Universe ===
In 1981 this book was first published by Islamic Academy of Sciences, compiling the previously published articles on Quran and Science. In 1998, the same book was published under the title The Universe Seen Through The Quran from Canada, which is now in its fifth revision. In 2004, Islamic Heritage Foundation in coordination with Islamic Academy of Sciences have published this work with the name Scientific Facts in The Glorious Quran.

=== Other books ===
- Attributes of Allah – Explained Exclusively through Quran
- Explanatory Dictionary of the Holy Quran
- Synonyms of the Holy Quran
- Success Predestined or Achieved?
- Elements of Namaz
- Elementary Grammar and Dictionary of The Holy Quran
