= Muhammad Habib Shakir =

Egyptian Islamic scholar (1866–1939)

Muhammad Habib Shakir (1866 in Cairo – 1939 in Cairo) (Arabic: محمد حبيب شاكر) was an Egyptian judge, born in Cairo and a graduate from Al-Azhar University.

== Life ==
Sheikh Mohammed Shakir b. Ahmad b. ‘Abd al-Qadir was born in 1866 CE in Jirja, a city in Upper Egypt. He studied and graduated from Al-Azhar University. He died in 1939 in Cairo.

His son, Sheikh Ahmad Muhammad Shakir, wrote his biography in a treatise entitled Mohammed Shakir ‘Alam min A‘lam al-‘Asr

== Positions ==
- Sudan's Supreme Judge for four years (1890-1893)
- Dean of Alexandria's Scholars
- Al-Azhar Secretary General ("Wakil") and a member of its board of directors
- Member of Al-Azhar Corps of High Scholars
- Member of Al-Azhar legislative Society ("al-Jam‘iyya al-Tashri‘iyya")

== Works ==
- "Al-Durus al-Awwaliyya fi al-‘Aqa’id al-Diniyya"
- "Al-Qawl al-Fasl fi Tarjamat al-Qur’an al-Karim"
- "Al-Sira al-Nabawiyya"

== Qur'an controversy ==
Mohammed Habib Shakir has been stated by many internet sources as "a well known translator of the Qur'an into English." He has been associated with the translator M. H. Shakir of the translation published by Tahrike Tarsile Qur'an. However this idea is contradicted by two pieces of evidence that have now come to light:

1. There is strong evidence that Mohammed Habib Shakir was against the translation of the Qur'an and considered the rendering of the Arabic into any other language unlawful.
2. There is strong evidence that M. H. Shakir, the translator, is actually a pen name for Mohammedali Habib Shakir the son of Habib Esmail of The House of Habib.

== See also ==
- List of Islamic scholars
- Translation of the Qur'an
