= Kanzul Iman =

Urdu translation of the Quran by Ahmad Raza Khan

Kanz ul-Iman (Urdu: کنزالایمان, romanized: Kanz ul-Īmān, lit. 'Treasure of Faith') is an Urdu translation of the Qur'an by Ahmad Raza Khan.

== Translations ==
Ahmad Raza Khan adopted the Urdu translation originally done by Shah Abdul Qadir Dehlvi and wrote the translation in Urdu. It has been subsequently translated into other European and South Asian languages including English, Hindi, Bengali, Dutch, Turkish, Sindhi, Gujarati and Pashto.

In English

- The Holy Qur'án (The treasure of faith) Kanzul Iman (Urdu), Rendered into English, Professor Shah Faridul Haque.
- Other translation was completed by Professor Hanif Akhtar Fatmi. Aqib Farid Qadri recently published a third translation.

In Dutch

- De Heilige Qoraan, Rendered into Dutch by Goelam Rasoel Alladien

In Turkish

- Kur'an-i Karîm, Rendered into Turkish by İsmail Hakkı İzmirli

== Prominent institutions ==
A library with the name Kanz ul-Iman Islamic Library was established in Bareilly in the year 2006.
