= Sadwaqas Ghylmani =

Qadi of Qadiyat of Kazakh SSR
- In office 1952–1972

Personal life
- Born: 1890 Maltabar, Akmolinsk Oblast, Russian Empire
- Died: 24 April 1972 (aged 81–82) Almaty, Kazakh SSR, Soviet Union
- Resting place: Kensai Cemetery
- Main interest(s): Islamic theology, poetry

Religious life
- Religion: Islam
- Denomination: Sunni
- Jurisprudence: Hanafi

Sadwaqas (Saken, Sadvakas) Ghylmani (Gilmanov, Gelmanov) (Kazakh: Сәдуақас Ғылмани, Säduaqas Ğylmani; 1890 – April 24, 1972) was a long-serving qadi of Kazakhstan (Kazakh SSR), imam-khatib and member of the Muslim Council for Central Asia and Kazakhstan.

== Early life ==
Sadwaqas Ghylmani was born in 1890 in Maltabar village (aul) (Akmolinsk Oblast of Russian Empire) in Bashkir-origin family. His grandfather Salmen Muhamediyarovich Gazin (1856–1939) and great-grandfather Muhamediyar Mukhtarovich Gazin (1807–1870) were mullahs.

== Career ==
From 1929 to 1946 he was persecuted by Soviet authorities. In 1946 he became a mullah (imam) in a mosque in Akmolinsk (modern Astana, capital of Kazakhstan). In 1952, qadi (Kazakh: қазы) of Kazakhstani Qadiyat (Kazakh: Қазият) Abd al-Ghaffar Shamsutdinov appointed him as his successor. Sadwaqas Ghylmani held this position until his death on April 24, 1972. He is buried at the Kensai cemetery in Almaty.

== Bibliography ==
- Ғылмани, С. (2015). edit. Ә. Қ. Муминов, А. Дж. Франк (ed.). Заманымызда болған ғұламалардың ғұмыр тарихтары. Vol. 1 (2 ed.). Алма-Ата: Дайк-Пресс. ISBN 978-601-290-072-9.
- Қамзабекұлы, Д. (2012). "Садуақас Ғылмани мұрасы: Көкейкестілігі және жүйелену негізі". Л. Н. Гумилев атындағы ЕҰУ Хабаршысы (1 (86)).
