= Waseem Ahmed (artist) =

Pakistani contemporary miniature painter and visual artist (born 1976)

- Born: 1976 (age 49–50); Hyderabad, Sindh, Pakistan
- Education: National College of Arts (BFA)
- Known for: Contemporary Miniature Painter

Waseem Ahmed (born 1976 in Hyderabad, Pakistan) is a contemporary miniature painter and visual artist, living and working in Lahore, Punjab, Pakistan.

== Biography ==
Waseem earned a Bachelor's degree in Fine Arts from University of Sindh in Hyderabad before pursuing another bachelor's degree in Miniature Painting from the National College of Arts, Lahore in 2000.

Since 2001, Ahmed is a Visiting assistant professor at the Miniature Painting Department of the National College of Arts in Lahore.

In 2014, Ahmed was the first artist-in-residence at the Museum für Asiatische Kunst in Berlin participating in the Humboldt Lab Dahlem project, where he was invited to create a new body of work in dialogue with the permanent collection of the Museum für Asiatische Kunst in Berlin and the city of Berlin. The project also included a retrospective at the Museum für Asiatische Kunst in 2014–2015

== Artistic approach ==
Combining traditional miniature techniques, such as gouache and gold and silver leaf on wasli paper, with experimental techniques, Ahmed creates small and large scale works that address various social, political and cultural issues. His vocabulary borrows elements from Asian and European art history and mythology.

== Exhibitions ==
Waseem Ahmed had his first solo show at the National College of Arts Lahore, Pakistan in 2000.

Ahmed's work was exhibited in Pakistan (Karachi, Lahore, Islamabad) and internationally, including Museum für Asiatische Kunst Berlin, Fukuoka Asian Art Museum (2004), Laurent Delaye Gallery in London, Gowen Contemporary in Geneva, Jason McCoy Gallery in New York, Katmandu Triennale, and the Karachi Biennale.

== Collections ==
Waseem Ahmed is represented in international collections including the Museum of Asian Art (German: Museum für Asiatische Kunst) and the British Museum in London.
