= Wasim Ahmad =

Indian politician

Wasim Ahmad was an Independent politician and Civil engineer from India who was the Member of Rajya Sabha from 30 November 1996 to 4 July 1998.

== Personal life ==
He was born on 1 March 1952 in Etah district, Uttar Pradesh. In 1979, he became secretary of AMU Students’ Union. In April 2021, he died after a cardiac arrest.
