= Aharon Ben-Shemesh =

Israeli academic

Aharon Ben-Shemesh (Hebrew: אַהֲרֹן בֵּן־שֶׁמֶשׁ; 1889–1988) was an Israeli writer, translator, and lecturer in Islamic Law at Tel Aviv University. He published a modern Hebrew translation of the Quran from the original Arabic in 1971, and an English translation in 1979.

== Selected bibliography ==
- Ben-Shemesh, A. (1953). Ḥuḳe ha-ḳarḳaʻot bi-medinat Yiśraʼel [Land Laws in the State of Israel] (in Hebrew). Tel Aviv: Massada.
- Ben-Shemesh, A., ed. (1958). Yaḥyā ben Ādam's Kitāb al-Kharāj. Taxation in Islam. Vol. 1. Leiden: E. J. Brill.
- Ben-Shemesh, A., ed. (1965). Qudāma b. Ja'far's Kitāb al-kharāj, part seven, and excerpts from Abū Yūsuf's kitāb al-kharāj. Taxation in Islam. Vol. 2. Leiden: E. J. Brill.
- Ben-Shemesh, A., ed. (1969). Abū Yūsuf's Kitāb al-Kharāj. Taxation in Islam. Vol. 3. Leiden: E. J. Brill.
- Ben-Shemesh, A., ed. (1971). Ha-Ḳurʼan ha-ḳadosh: sefer ha-sefarim shel ha-Iślam [The Holy Qurʼān: The Great Book of Islam] (in Hebrew). Ramat Gan: Massada.
