= Uri Rubin =

Israeli academic (1944–2021)

- אורי רובין
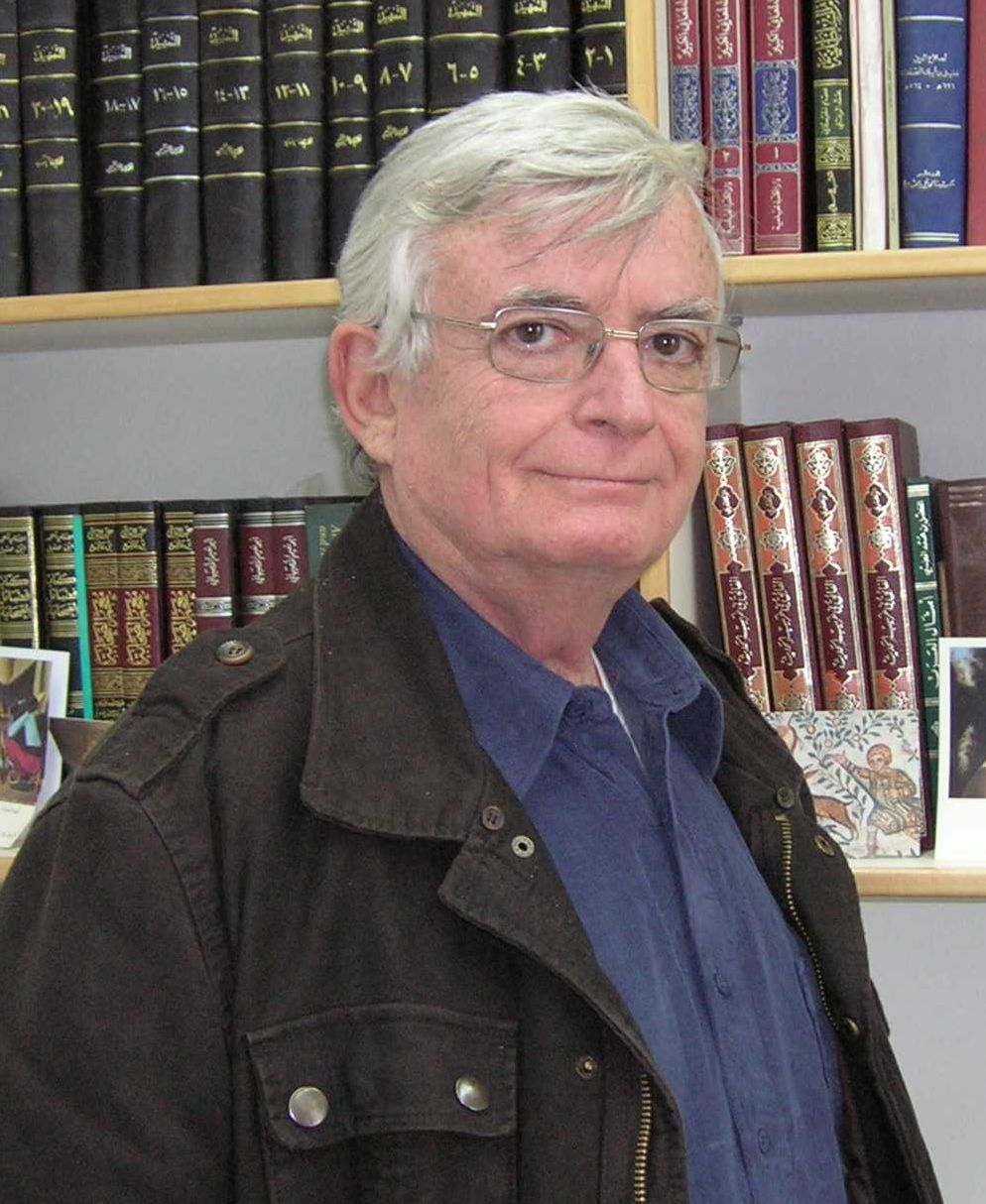
- Rubin in 2007
- Born: 1944; Kiryat Ono, Israel
- Died: 26 October 2021 (aged 77); 9 Helsinki Street, Tel Aviv
- Education: Neues Gymnasium (Tel Aviv), Tel Aviv University
- Alma mater: Tel Aviv University
- Website: www.urirubin.com

Uri Rubin (Hebrew: אורי רובין; 1944 – 26 October 2021) was an Israeli academic who was a professor in the Department of Arabic and Islamic Studies at Tel Aviv University. His areas of research were early Islam (with special emphasis on the Qur'an), Qur'an exegesis (tafsir), and early Islamic tradition (sira and hadith). He authored a number of books on the subjects and also contributed entries to the Encyclopaedia of Islam and other works.

Rubin also served on the Advisory Board for the Encyclopaedia of the Qur'an.

== Life ==
Uri Rubin was born and raised in Kiryat Ono, attending high school in Tel Aviv. The school principal, Tony Hella, opened a Mizrahi trend in those years, and Robin studied it and was a graduate of the first cycle. He graduated with his undergraduate degree in the History of the Middle East at the Bible Department at Tel Aviv University. When he finished, he started at Tel Aviv University's Department of Language and Arabic Literature, founded by Professor Meir Yaakov Kister. He then went on a direct track to a Ph.D. at Tel Aviv University, finishing with honors. His dissertation, submitted in 1975, was on Muhammad's character in the ancient Islamic tradition and was conducted under the guidance of Professor Kister.

The first part of the dissertation dealt with Muhammad's character as a pre-existential entity. The second part dealt with the aspect of the Muhammad figure, focusing on the comparative analysis of traditions on the role of the Prophet on the day of the resurrection and on the day of law. The work was based on the manuscript of Abu Sa'ed Al -Hathageshi, which is a wide file of ancient traditions dealing with various aspects of Muhammad's life and image, in his status among his believers and virtues as the last of the prophets.

Towards the end of his Ph.D., Rubin was a member of the Qur'an Encyclopedia's Advisory Committee, published by Brill (Leiden). He was at the Institute of Advanced Studies in Jerusalem in 1998/99 and in 2009/10, achieving the level of full-time professor before his retirement on October 1, 2012. Airin Helm's Arabic Literature Grade in 2009-2014.

== Studies and publications ==
Uri Rubin dealt with the study of the Qur'an, the interpretation of the Qur'an and ancient Islamic tradition. The purpose of his research was to reveal the worldview of the first Muslims about their pre-Islamic past, their religion and their culture as expressed in both the Qur'an and the foreign-Korean, religious and historiographical Islamic literature. These sources were used not for the study of events described in them but for the purpose of examining the way the events are described, as a means of exposing the worldview of the texts of the texts. He did not even distinguish between "history" and "legend" but between different buildings of traditions and different worldviews that have grown the texts found in us. During his research years, he published books and articles and wrote values to the Encyclopedia of the Quran, to the second and third editions of Encyclopedia of Islam, the reserve volume (c) of the Hebrew Encyclopedia, and other encyclopedias, and published book reviews. In 2005, he published a new Hebrew translation into Koran.

=== Articles ===
Two articles dealing with the Abrahamic religion in the pre-Islamic Arabia and its connection to the worship of the Kaaba in the city of Mecca.

In these articles, Robin rejected the worldview that was accepted by Islamic scholars (mainly inspired by the publications of Dutch scholar Snouck Hurgronje), according to which the connection between Abraham and the Kaaba was created in Muhammad's mind after he made the Hijara from Mecca to the state, where he met Jewish tribes whose hearts he tried to win by declaring Jerusalem as the official Islamic direction of prayer. The researchers believe that after his hopes of winning the hearts of the Jews was dashed, Muhammad decided to break away from the Jews and turn his back on Jerusalem, and begin to praying in the direction of the Kaaba, which he presented as a temple established by Abraham. Thus, according to the researchers, the idea of the religion of Abraham was born as a model for Muhammad's Islam, a model intended to highlight the gap between Islam and the Jews, followers of the religion of Moses. In his articles, Robin showed that according to Islamic sources, the idea of the Abrahamic religion was already known in pre- Islamic times, and its followers (known as hanifs in Islamic traditions) saw the Kaaba as a distinct Abrahamic sanctuary and it served as their direction of prayer long before Muhammad attempted to break away from the Jews of Medina.

==== The holiness of Jerusalem ====
Robin returned to the issue of the status of the Kaaba as a direction of prayer in two more recent articles that also deal with the sanctity of Jerusalem.

In these articles Rubin claimed that the Islamic Saddish of Jerusalem was very ancient roots, perhaps even a pre -Islamic. He claimed that we had evidence of a holy-in -alic axis that was acceptable in these areas even before the appearance of Islam and this was reflected in ancient traditions that present the Prophet Muhammad as having to pray to Mecca and Jerusalem at the same time. This appears in the earliest traditions about Muhammad preserved in his biography attacked by Ibn Ashak (died in 150 Hijara). According to these traditions, the Prophet Muhammad when he prayed, used to stand in front of the southern Western Wall of the thickening, with his face to the thickening and Jerusalem at the same time. Robin believes that the Khakha-Jerusalem vintage is also reflected in a verse in the Korean from Mecca (Sora 17 Ps. Robin believed that "the extreme mosque" is Jerusalem, contrary to the opinion of a number of researchers who claimed that the "extreme mosque" is a mosque in the sky and not in Jerusalem. For example, Emmanuel Sivan, as well as Muslim commentators as a stone as a "picking of a stone" ("grabbing" is an interpretation of the Qur'an). It should be noted here that the mosque on the Temple Mount called the Al-Aqsa Mosque was established in the second half of the seventh century AD after Muhammad's death.

Rubin claimed that Jerusalem's holiness was known to Muhammad and he adopted it as part of his self -perception that he was the seal of the prophets (an expression appearing in the Qur'an, Sura 33:40. The Qur'an also calls the Land of Israel "Holy Land", and it is in line with the fact that the prophets of Israel according to the Qur'an are Muslims. Robin also wrote in his articles. In other words, Robin believed that Muhammad's prayer for Jerusalem did not begin to buy the hearts of the Jews after reaching the state, but it was a continuation of the Holy Axis of Jerusalem that his roots even before Muhammad reached the state. However, as soon as the Jews referred to him, then a blow to the main focus of religion and this was reflected in the column in the Quran from a Madina state era, where believers are pointing to turn their faces towards the Holy Temple in Mecca. In other words, Robin believed that at one point the axis of Jerusalem lost its balance and the Kaaba became a central holy focus.

==== The Arabian background of the Qur'an ====
In his recent articles, Uri Rubin studied the Qur'an's Arab background, in light of studies published in his last decades in his life that emphasized the Qur'an's non-Arab background. Stroll between them John Wansbrough's book from 1977. This book shook the foundations when he claimed that the Qur'an was not created on the eve of Muhammad's Arabia, but generations after the prophet's death in the region of Babylon. According to this study, the Qur'an is not the earliest text we have, but it is a product of the Islamic society and is formulated after the death of the Prophet under a distinct Jewish influence.

In 2001, German investigator Christophe Luxenberg published a study, in which he tries to show that the Qur'an's Arabic is actually Aramaic, which Muslims later edited it into Arabic, he does not suggest any place of origin, but if it was created in Arabia, there is no reason for it to be written in Aramaic. After Luxenberg's research, the need arises to reaffirm the Arabic-linguistic-philological background of the Quran.

In this context, Rubin, in an article published in 2009, revealed the Arabic roots of the word "furqan" that appears in the Quran, which scholars agree is of pure Aramaic origin, without any roots in pre-Islamic Arabic. In his article, Rubin noted that although this is an Aramaic word (meaning "salvation"), he also pointed to its Arabic equivalent that exists in Arabic dictionaries that document pre-Islamic Arabic. There, the word "furqan" denotes "the light of dawn," and Rubin argued that the word can also be understood in this meaning of "the light of dawn" in some of its contexts in the Quran, where it describes the prophetic message given to the prophet. This is an example Rubin claimed illustrates that not everything in the Quran is Aramaic.

==== Uri Robin's Quran translation ====
The Quran translations in Hebrew were already done in the Middle Ages, but these were not translations from the Arabic language, but from European languages such as Italian or Dutch, these translations are found in manuscripts. The first Western printed translation was made by Zvi Herman Recondorf and appeared in 1857 in Leipzig. The second translation was made by Joseph Joel Rivlin and appeared by Bialik's Dvir in 1937. In 1971, Aaron Ben-Shemen translation appeared. Uri Rubin's translation into the Qur'an who appeared in 2005, was an attempt to offer the reader as an accurate Hebrew text as possible but also as readable and washed as much as possible, and he endeavored to reflect the conventional interpretation of the Sunni stream in Islam. Robin added marginal comments on various meanings that were not reflected in the body of the translation, as well as appendit the correspondence of the Qur'an, and developed detailed matters.

A new, up -to -date and extended edition of Uri Rubin's Qur'an translation appeared in 2016, under the publishing of Tel Aviv University.

In his latest publications, he engaged in the study of new aspects of the biblical and Midrashi background of the Qur'an.

== Death ==
Rubin died on October 26, 2021.

== Books ==
- The Eye of the Beholder: The Life of Muhammad as Viewed by the Early Muslims (A Textual Analysis). Princeton, New Jersey: The Darwin Press, 1995.
- Dhimmis and Others: Jews and Christians and the World of Classical Islam. Israel Oriental Studies 17 (1997).(Edited with David J. Wasserstein).
- Between Bible and Qur'an: The Children of Israel and the Islamic Self-Image. Princeton, New Jersey: The Darwin Press, 1999.
- Muhammad the Prophet and Arabia. Variorum Collected Studies Series, Ashgate, 2011.
- The Koran translation, Tel Aviv University, Publishing, 2005, also an extended edition in 2016.(Edited with David J. Wasserstein).
- The Qur'an: Divine Voice to Muhammad Apostle, Magnes Press, 2019.
