= Mirza Ghulam Ahmad bibliography =

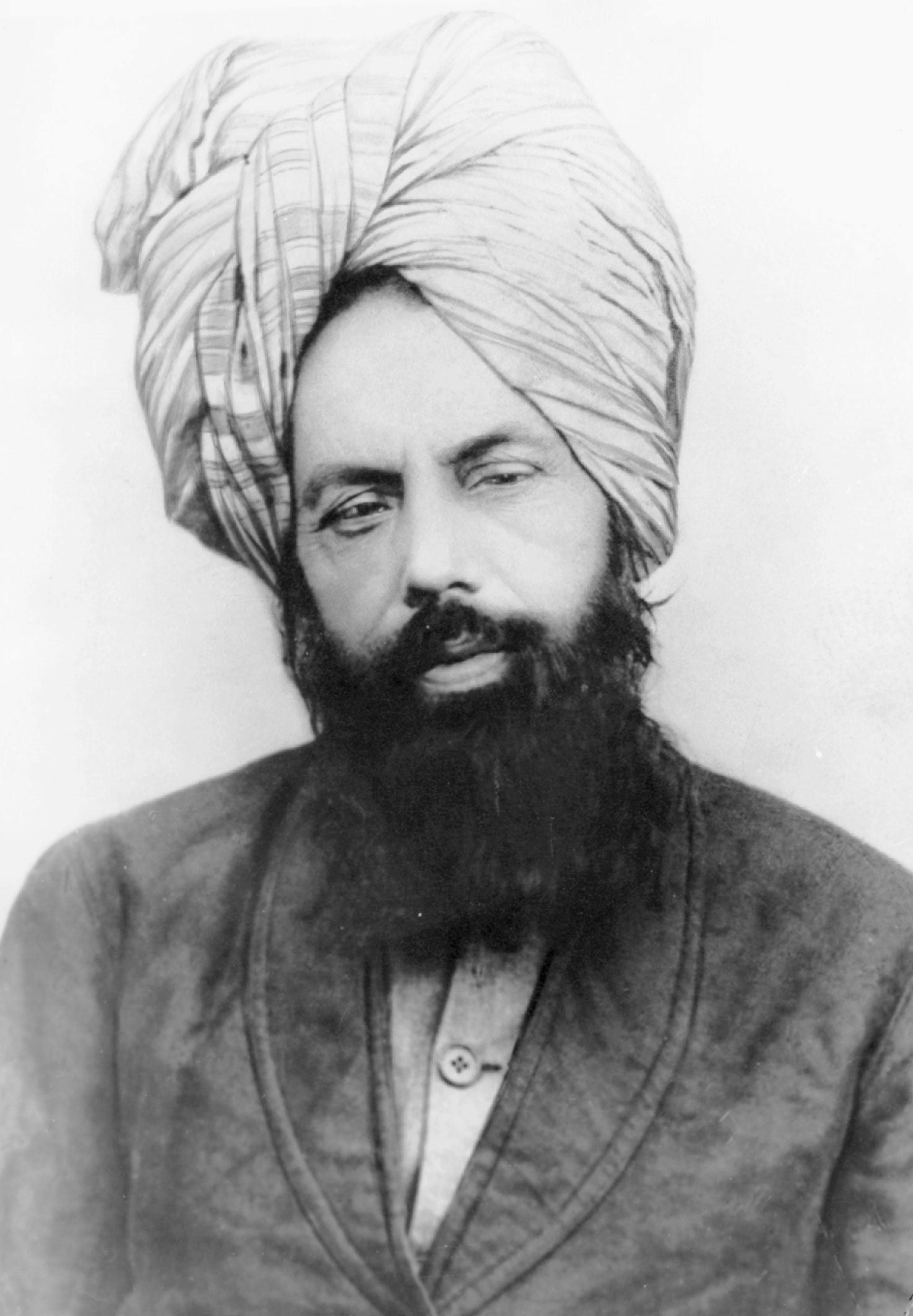
Mirza Ghulam Ahmad, founder of the Ahmadiyya (1835-1908)

Mirza Ghulam Aḥmad (February 13, 1835–May 26, 1908) was a religious figure from India and the founder of the Ahmadiyya Muslim Community. He claimed to be the Mujaddid (divine reformer) of the 14th Islamic century, the promised Messiah ("Second Coming of Christ"), and the Mahdi awaited by the Muslims in the end days. He declared that Jesus (Isa) had actually survived the crucifixion and later died a natural death after having migrated towards Kashmir, him having appeared in the likeness of Jesus.

Mirza Ghulam Ahmad is known to have produced a vast amount of literature. He wrote more than ninety books, many of which extend to hundreds of pages. His written works often contain both prose and poetry in three different languages: Urdu, Arabic and Persian, though primarily Urdu. His writings contain the exposition and explanation of Islamic teachings, often reinterpreted. A wide range of subjects are also dealt with, such as mysticism and the intricate issues of Islamic theology. His writings used the Qur'an to elaborate and give meaning to various ideas. Many of his books bear a polemical and apologetic tone in favour of Islam. Several of his books were distributed internationally during his lifetime. His essay entitled The Philosophy of the Teachings of Islam (originally presented at a conference of religions held in Lahore in December 1896 and later published as a book) was well received by various intellectuals, including Leo Tolstoy of Russia.

His works were collected under the leadership of Mirza Nasir Ahmad, the third khalifa of Ghulam Ahmad. Most of his writings were compiled in the twenty-three volume corpus known as Rūhānī Khazā᾽in (Spiritual Treasures), which includes his books, pamphlets, and various articles. His announcements and advertisements were collected in the Majmu'a Ishtihārāt (Collection of Announcements). His letters have been compiled into 5 volumes known as Maktūbāt-e-Ahmad (Letters of Ahmad), and his complete discourses or sayings have been compiled in 10 volumes known as the Malfūzāt (Spoken Words). Initially, all of his works were hand composed by calligraphers (کاتب). Nazarat Ishaat, based in Rabwah, Pakistan, and Nazarat Nashro Ishaat, based in Qadian, India, have been the key organizations responsible for preserving, composing and publishing the works in hand composed and computerized versions. Mirza Ghulam Ahmed died in Lahore on 26th May, 1908.

== List of books ==
Name of Book (Original)	Name of Book (English)	Volume	Year Published
A’ina-e-Kamalat-e-Islam	The Mirror of the Excellences of Islam	5	1893
Ahmadi Awr Ghayr Ahmadi Mein Kya Farq Hai?	The Advent of the Promised Messiah ()	20	1906
Al-Balagh Ya Faryad-e-Dard	The Message or a Cry of Anguish	13	1922
Al-Haq Mubahathah Dehli	The Delhi Debate	4	1905
Al-Haq Mubahathah Ludhiana	The Ludhiana Debate	4	1903
Al-Huda Wa-Tabsirato Liman Yara	Guidance for Perceiving Minds	18	1902
Al-Wasiyyat	The Will ()	20	1905
Anjam-e-Atham	The Final stage of Atham	11	1897
Anwarul-Islam	The Splendours of Islam	9	1895
Arba‘in	Forty Announcements ()	17	1900
Aryah Dharam	The Arya Religion	10	1895
Ăsmani Faislah	The Heavenly Decree ()	4	1892
Ayyam-us-Sulh	Days of Reconciliation	14	1899
Barahin-e-Ahmadiyya (Part I)	Proofs of Muhammad... (Part I) ()	1	1880
Barahin-e-Ahmadiyya (Part II)	Proofs of Muhammad... (Part II) ()	1	1880
Barahin-e-Ahmadiyya (Part III)	Proofs of Muhammad... (Part III) ()	1	1882
Barahin-e-Ahmadiyya (Part IV)	Proofs of Muhammad... (Part IV) ()	1	1884
Barahin-e-Ahmadiyya (Part V)	Proofs of Muhammad... (Part V) ()	21	1908
Barakat-ud-Du‘a’	Blessings of Prayer ()	6	1893
Chashma'-e-Ma‘rifat	The Fountain of Enlightenment	23	1908
Chashma'-e-Masih	Fountain of Christianity ()	20	1906
Dafi‘ul-Bala’ Wa Mi‘yaru Ahlil-Istifa’	Defence against the Plague and A Criterion for the Elect of God ()	18	1902
Daruratul-Imām	The Need for the Imam ()	13	1898
Diya’ul-Haq	The Radiance of Truth	9	1895
Eik ‘Isa’i Kei Tin Sawal Aur Unkei Jawabat	Three Questions by a Christian and their Answers ()	4	1891
Eik Ghalati Ka Izala	A Misconception Removed ()	18	1901
Fateh-Islam	The Victory of Islam ()	3	1891
Government Angrezi Aur Jihad	The British Government and Jihad ()	17	1900
Gunah se Nijat Kyun-kar Mil Sakte Hai?	How to be Free from Sin ()	18	1902
Hamāma-tul-Bushra (Arabic)	The Dove of Glad Tidings	7	1894
Haqiqatul-Mahdi	The True Nature of the Mahdi ()	14	1899
Haqiqatul-Wahi	The Philosophy of Divine Revelation ()	22	1907
Hujjatul-Islam	A Conclusive Argument in Favour of Islam ()	6	1893
Hujjatullah	The Convincing Proof from God	12	1897
I‘jaz-e-Ahmadi	The Miracle of Ahmad ()	19	1902
I‘jazul-Masih	Miracle of the Messiah	18	1901
Islami Usul Ki Philosophy	The Philosophy of the Teachings of Islam ()	10	1905
Ismat-e-Anbiya	The Honour of Prophets ()	18	1902
Istifta	Asking for Opinion on a Religious Matter	12	1897
Itmāmul-Hujjah	The Conclusive Argument ()	8	1894
Izala-e-Auhaam	The Removal of Misconceptions	3	1891
Jalsa-e-Ahbab		12	1897
Jang-e-Muqaddas	The Holy War ()	6	1893
Karamatus Sādiqeen	Miracles of the Truthful	7	1893
Kashful-Ghatā	The Truth Unveiled ()	14	1898
Kashti-e-Nuh	Noah's Ark ()	19	1902
Khutbah Ilhamiyyah	The Revealed Sermon	16	1902
Kitab-ul-Bariyyah	The Book of Acquittal	13	1898
Lecture Lahore	Lecture Lahore ()	20	1904
Lecture Ludhiana	Lecture Ludhiana ()	20	1905
Lecture Sialkot	Lecture Sialkot ()	20	1904
Lujjatun-Nur (Arabic)	The Ocean of Light ()	16	1910
Mahmud Ki Amin	Mahmud’s Aameen ()	12	1897
Majmua Amin		17	1897
Masih Hindustan Mein	Jesus in India ()	15	1908
Mawahibur-Rahman	Bounties of the Gracious God ()	19	1903
Mi‘yarul-Madhahib	The Criterion for Religions ()	9	1895
Minan-ur-Rahman	Arabic – Mother of all languages )	9	1895
Najmul-Hudā	The Guiding Star	14	1898
Nasim-e-Da‘wat	The Breeze of Invitation	19	1903
Nishan-e-Ăsmani	The Heavenly Sign ()	4	1892
Nurul-Haqq (Part I)	Light of Truth (Part I)	8	1894
Nurul-Haqq (Part II)	Light of Truth (Part II)	8	1894
Nurul-Qur'an (Part I)	The Light of the Holy Qur'an (Part I) ()	9	1895
Nurul-Qur'an (Part II)	The Light of the Holy Qur'an (Part II) ()	9	1899
Nuzul-ul-Masih	The Descent of the Messiah	18	1909
Paigham-e-Sulah	A Message of Peace ()	23	1908
Purani Tahrirein	Early Writings	2	1899
Qadian Kei Aryah Aur Ham		20	1907
Raz-e-Haqiqat	A Hidden Truth ()	14	1898
Review Bar Mubahathah Batalvi Wa Chakrhalvi	A Review of the Debate between Batalavi and Chakrhalavi ()	19	1902
Ru’idaad-e-Jalsa-e-Du’aa	Proceedings of the Prayer Meeting ()	15	1900
Sabz Ishtihar	The Green Announcement ()	2	1888
Sachcha’i ka Izhar	The Truth Revealed ()	6	1893
Sanātan Dharam	Sanatan Religion	19	1903
Satt Bachan	The True Word	10	1895
Shahadatul-Qur’an	Testimony of the Holy Quran ()	6	1893
Shahna'-e-Haqq	Bugle of Truth	2	1923
Siraj-e-Munir	The Shining Lamp ()	12	1897
Siraj-ud-Din ‘Isa’i Kei Char Sawalon Ka Jawab	Four Questions by Mr. Sirājuddīn, a Christian, and their Answers ()	12	1897
Siratul-Abdal	Hallmarks of the Saints ()	20	1903
Sirrul-Khilafah	The Reality of Khilafah ()	8	1894
Sitara-e-Qaisariyyah	Star of the Empress ()	15	1899
Surmah Chashm-e-Aryah	Guidance for the Ăryas	2	1886
Tadhkiratush-Shahadatain	The Narrative of Two Martyrdoms ()	20	1903
Tajalliyat-e-Ilahiyyah	Divine Manifestations ()	20	1922
Taudih-e-Maram	Elucidation of Objectives ()	3	1891
Tiryaqul-Qulub	Antidote of the Hearts	15	1902
Tuhfa-e-Baghdad (Arabic)	A Gift for Baghdad ()	7	1893
Tuhfa-e-Ghaznaviyyah	A Gift for the Ghaznavis	15	1902
Tuhfa-e- Golarhviyyah	A Gift for Golarhvi	17	1902
Tohfa-e-Qaisariyyah	A Gift for the Queen ()	12	1897
Tuhfatun-Nadwah	A Gift for An-Nadwah ()	19	1902
