= Ahmadiyya view on Jihad =

In Ahmadiyya Islam, Jihad is a radical concept. It is primarily one's personal inner and outer struggle for self-purification. Armed struggle or military exertion is only to be used in defense. However, even then it can only be carried out under the direct instruction of a Caliph, purely for the sake of God and the preservation of religion. It is not permissible that jihad be used to spread Islam violently or for political motives, or that it be waged against a government that maintains religious freedom. Political conflicts (even from a defensive stand) over independence, land and resources or reasons other than religious belief cannot be termed jihad. There is a clear distinction, in Ahmadi theology, between Jihad (striving) and qitāl or jihad bil-saif (fighting). While Jihad may involve fighting, not all fighting can be called Jihad. Rather, according to Ahmadiyya belief, qitāl or military jihad is applicable only as a defensive measure in very strictly defined circumstances and those circumstances do not exist at present.

Ahmadiyya claims its objective to be the revival and peaceful propagation of Islam with special emphasis on defending and extending Islam 'by the pen' and by argumentation. Ahmadis point out that as per prophecy, Mirza Ghulam Ahmad (whom they believe to the Messiah and Mahdi) rendered Jihad in its military form as almost entirely inapplicable in the present age since Islam, as a religion, is not being attacked militarily this conditions for an armed Jihad are not met. However, since Islam is being attacked through literature and other media, therefore the response should be likewise, Jihad of the Pen.

== Spread of faith ==
Ahmadis denounce the usage of a sword or any other form of coercion as a method of the propagation of the Islamic faith. In contrast to some of the commonly held views that historically Islam was spread by force, Ahmadis maintain that early Muslims did not take up the sword in order to spread their faith, but rather for the preservation of religion. In particular, the founder of the movement, Mirza Ghulam Ahmad stated that when Islam began gaining converts upon its birth, there was an ever-increasing tension against the new converts by the pagans of Mecca, which resulted in them being severely persecuted for many years. After many years of patience, the Muslim converts migrated to the neighbouring city of Medina. This did not stop persecuting the Muslims. They were pursued by the Pagans and it was only then that the Muslims first took up the sword in order to defend their lives and preserve the religion.

Ahmadis denounce the usage of a sword as an Islamic concept with support from the Qur'an which according to them categorically rejects any form of coercion in religion. The Qur'an states:

There is no compulsion in religion

— The Qur'an 2:256

== Terrorism ==
The fourth Caliph, of the Ahmadiyya Muslim Community, Mirza Tahir Ahmad states:

As far as Islam is concerned, it categorically rejects and condemns every form of terrorism. It does not provide any cover or justification for any act of violence, be it committed by an individual, a group or a government..... I most strongly condemn all acts and forms of terrorism because it is my deeply rooted belief that not only Islam but also no true religion, whatever its name, can sanction violence and bloodshed of innocent men, women and children in the name of God

— Murder in the Name of Allah - Mirza Tahir Ahmad

== See also ==
- Ahmadiyya Militia, an Ahmadiyya self-defense unit during the Partition of India
- Furqan Force, an Ahmadiyya military unit during the First Kashmir War
- The British Government and Jihad
