= The Heavenly Decree =

1891 book by Mirza Ghulam Ahmad

Asmani Faislah (English: The Heavenly Decree) is an Urdu book written in 1891 by Mirza Ghulam Ahmad who claimed to be the promised Messiah and Mahdi, Qadian India. The Founder of the Ahmadiyya Muslim Jama'at. This English translation has been published by the Islam International Publications Ltd (2006) 'Islamabad', Sheephatch Lane, Tilford, Surrey, GU10 2AQ, UK. (ISBN 1 85372 953 1).

== Contents ==
In 1889 Mirza Ghulam Ahmad began to accept initiation into his Community, he was opposed vehemently by the clergy of all religions. One famous Ahl al-Hadith Maulavi Syed Nazeer Husain (1805 – May 1902) (Shaykh al-Kull fil-Kull) of Delhi and his close disciple Molvi Muhammad Hussain Batalvi were among the arch opponents. A Fatwā to the effect that Ghulam Ahmad was Kafir ( "unbeliever," "disbeliever," or "infidel.") had been issued by Maulavi Syed Nazeer Husain which brought forth innumerable other Fatwās throughout the Punjab and India.

=== Ground of Fatwā ===
The Fatwā was based upon the fact that Ghulam Ahmad claimed that according to the Quran and Ahadith, Jesus son of Mary was saved from death upon the Cross, and that he had died his natural death. He believed, Jesus was not living somewhere in heaven or would return to the world in latter days—as believed by the Muslim and Christian clergy and laity. He claimed the prophecy of his Second Coming was a metaphor and would be fulfilled by a person who would be like Jesus son of Mary in his nature, but would be born in the Ummah (Community) of Muhammad. Ahmad, was in Delhi and declared his faith in Islam by publishing three posters to that effect:

"I published three posters in Delhi, declaring, again and again, that I am a Muslim, and Islam is my faith. I conveyed the message under the oath of God Almighty that there is nothing in my speeches or writings which is contrary to Islamic beliefs—God forbid. This is merely a misunderstanding on the part of my opponents. I believe with all my heart and soul in all the tenets of Islam and abhor everything to the contrary. Miyan Sahib, however, paid no heed to what I said and declared me a kafir without investigation or verification. ...he dubbed me a kafir, faithless and a Dajjal [Antichrist], ... and devoid of faith. This incitement by Miyan Sahib stirred a furious storm among the common people, and the people of Punjab and India were greatly agitated." (page 5-6)

=== The Language of Maulvis ===
Molvi Muhammad Hussain Batalvi and the Maulavis in general used provocative language against Ghulam Ahmad, organised Fatwas [religious verdict] signed by hundreds of Ulema religious scholars that Ahmad was an unbeliever, or kafir. In these Fatwas, published all over the country, Ahmad was declared to be an infidel. He was called Dajjal, Mulhid, Zindiq, Makkar, Mal‘un, etc. Molvi Muhammad Hussain Batalvi wrote in his magazine Isha’t-us-Sunnah; that Ahmad was a "raving drunkard, intriguer, swindler, accursed, the one-eyed Dajjal, slave of silver and gold, whose revelation is nothing but a seminal discharge, shameless, the ring-leader of sweepers and street vagabonds, dacoit, murderer, whose followers are scoundrels, villains, adulterers, and drunkards."

=== Invitation to Debate ===
Ahmad invited Maulavi Syed Nazeer Husain of Delhi, to a debate and a date of 20 October 1891 was fixed, and he, "...stayed on in Delhi for one full month at great cost and inconvenience". The question of the debate would be the Life and Death of Jesus son of Mary. However, the latter refused to enter a debate with Ahmad on the pretext that he was a Kafir and would not enter in any debate with him. (page 8) Ahmad writes:

"I wrote to him, time and again, that I do not oppose him in any of his beliefs except that of the Messiah (Jesus son Mary) being physically alive. I most certainly believe him (Jesus Christ) to be dead and among the dead. Why should I not believe him to be dead when my God and my Lord, in His Glorious Book, the Holy Quran, counts him among the dead?" (page 10)
"If you can prove the physical existence (Life) of ‘Isa from the Holy Quran and Hadith, I shall not only revoke my claim, but shall burn all my books containing this subject." (page 10)

=== Why Debate with Syed Nazeer Husain ===
Ahmad insisted to hold a formal, oral or written debate with Syed Nazeer Husain for the reason, he explains:

"The reason for my special interest in relation to Miyan Sahib (Syed Nazeer Husain) is that people consider him to be the superior-most in his knowledge, and he is like the root among the religious scholars of India. If the root is cut, the branches too, shall invariably fall away. This debate will let the world know the arguments which Shaikhul Kul (the greatest scholar) has, regarding the bodily life of the Messiah, on the basis of which he has so inflamed the public."(page 12)

=== An absurd belief ===
Ahmad expresses his views about the "Continued Life" of Jesus as absurd:

"Not even once does the Holy Quran speak about his extraordinary life or second coming. Rather, it calls him dead and says no more. Not only do I reject Jesus’ bodily existence and later return to earth in view of revelations vouchsafed to me, but I also consider this concept absurd and false in the light of the clear and categorical injunctions of the Holy Quran." (page 10)

=== A Spiritual Duel ===
Ahmad gave Maulavi Syed Nazeer Husain another option, if due to his advanced age, weakness or any other reason, he was unable to enter into a debate, he may even make a declaration on Oath:

" If you are unable to discuss it, then come and declare upon oath that there is no mention of the death of the Messiah (Jesus Christ)in the Quran and only his life is mentioned. Or that there is a Sahih Marfu‘ Muttasil Hadith which testifies to the physical life of the Messiah (Jesus Christ) by offering a contrary interpretation to the word Tawaffa[died]." (page 10)

"If no clear sign from Almighty Allah appears within one year which proves that your oath was false, i.e., if you do not suffer some great calamity, I shall instantly repent at your hand." (page 10)

However, Maulavi Syed Nazeer Husain neither came forward for the debate, nor took the oath.

=== A Unique Contest ===
Ahmad wrote, a Perfect Believer has certain Signs from God. Like, he receives, good news before the happenings actually took place—and these good news are connected with the believers and their relatives and friends. And they are given information about what has to happen in future—near or distant—connected with the great figures in the world, or national and international affairs. The prayers of the perfect believers are heard and accepted and they are pre-informed of the acceptance of their prayer. Similarly, the perfect believers are given insight into the secrets of the word of God, the Holy Qur'an.

Ahmad says, he is prepared heart and soul to prove against Maulvi Syed Nazeer Husain and others that these things are to be found in him while they are devoid of these things. He proposes a detailed scheme to confirm these Sign in him or in his opponents. He wrote:

"Any reasonable person can understand that if I am indeed a kafir, Dajjal, liar, accursed, and outside the pale of Islam, as Miyan Syed Nazeer Husain and his acolyte Batalawi believe me to be, then at the time of the contest, Allah will show no sign peculiar to believers to testify in my favour. God never manifests the signs of belief in favour of disbelievers and enemies of the faith, for they are faithless and accursed. And why should He do so when He knows them to be enemies of the faith and deprived of the blessings of faith. Hence, if I am indeed such a kafir, a Dajjal, and an enemy of Islam, as Miyan Syed Nazeer Husain Sahib and Batalawi have described me in their fatwa, God shall never help me in this contest." (page 23)

However, none of the opponents, including Maulvi Syed Nazeer Husain agreed to enter this contest, which Ahmad called to be a Heavenly Decree.

=== The Annual Jalsa ===
The book also contains a notification about holding Jalsa Salana (the Annual Conference) every year on 27 to 29 December. This notification was issued on 30 December 1891.
