= The Criterion for Religions =

Book by Mirza Ghulam Ahmad

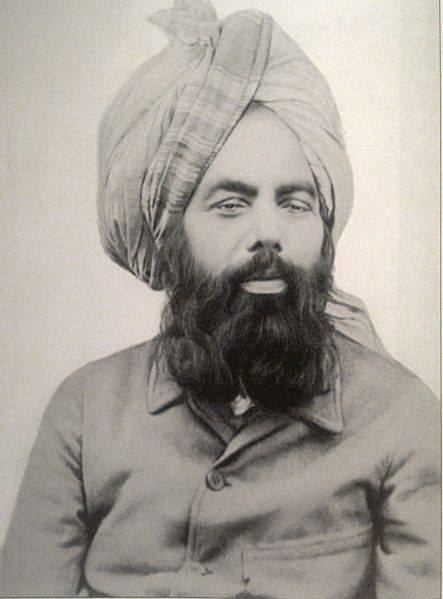
Author: Mirza Ghulam Ahmad (1835-1908)

The Criterion for Religions, the English rendering of Mi‘yarul Madhahib, was written and published in 1895 by Mirza Ghulam Ahmad, founder of the Ahmadiyya Muslim Community. This English edition was published in 2007, by Islam International Publications

== Description ==
Ahmad believed that Islam was a living faith and the only faith by which man could establish contact with his Creator and enter into communion with him. According to Ahmad, the teachings in the Quran and Sharia were designed to raise man to moral, intellectual and spiritual perfection.

Comparing Islam with other religions, Ahmad writes:

"Islam's understanding of God is very simple and clear, and is in keeping with human nature. Even if the books of all other religions were to disappear along with all of their teachings and concepts, God, towards Whom the Holy Quran leads, would still be clearly reflected in the mirror of the laws of nature, and His Might and Wisdom, shall be found glowing in every particle." (page 30)

== Why deify a man ==
Ahmad asks, how could the British Government, consisting of people so enlightened subscribe to a religion,

"that deifies a man and thus detracts from the self-evident, eternal and immutable glory of the true God?... Nevertheless, I am hopeful that He will guide this courageous Government towards the right path. Our prayer for this Government is as much for its worldly prosperity as for the hereafter. No wonder therefore if we do witness the effect of this prayer.(p-6)

== Means for the discovery of truth ==
Ahmad claims that modern education has replaced the old simple religious thinking with a complex philosophic mode. However, certain factors in the modern days have made the discovery of "Truth" even easier. First and foremost is the freedom to preach and move around in these days. He writes:

Is it not strange that while we are free to preach Islam in the streets of London, it is not possible for us to do the same in the Holy Mecca! Not only has this Government given freedom to publish books and preach one's religion to one and all, but has also taken upon itself to help every sect by spreading the knowledge of modern sciences and arts. Thus, through education and training it has opened the eyes of a whole world.

— p. 1

Similarly the profusion of printing presses, has brought to light even the old scriptures 'buried in the earth' "even the Vedas of the Hindus have come out dressed in new pages. In other words, it has been reborn, and the tales invented by the fools and the rabble have been exposed.

— p. 2

(The Third means) is the opening of the channels of communications, the establishment of an efficient postal system, and the conveyance of books from far off countries to our land and vice versa. All these means, which, by the grace of God, have now been made available in our country, and from which we are freely benefiting, are instrumental in searching for the truth.

— p. 2

== Major faiths ==
Ahmad observes India has three major religious faiths. The Araya Hindus, the Christians and the Muslims. He claims none is ready to accept that his faith is not based on the true principles.

=== The hallmark of a true religion ===
Ahmad writes:

"The hallmark of a true religion is that even before we advance arguments in its favour, it is, in its very essence, so bright and resplendent that against it all other religions appear to be enveloped in darkness."

Ahmad writes the teachings contained in the Quran were in strict accord with instinctive human requirements and it took them to a higher plank of sublimity and spiritualism. . Ahmad says,'Islam is strictly in accord with human nature and appeals to mankind'.

=== Differentiate true from false religion ===
The author believes, a true religion can be differentiated from a false one, by its approach to the "recognition of God". He writes: "the religion which possesses the intrinsic light of truth, and which has the ability to draw hearts towards itself purely because of its manner of Divine recognition." (p. 6)

He compares the three major religions with regard to this criterion.

=== God in the Arya and Christian Religions ===
Ahmad critically examines:

Can any pure conscience ever accept that the Creator of heaven and earth, Who is the Omnipotent, and possesses limitless powers, should end up so unfortunate, weak and miserable that mischief-makers should trample him under their feet? If anyone worships such a 'God' and relies upon him, it is up to him. But the truth is that if you compare the God of the Christians even with the Parameshwar of the Aryas, and weigh his power and might, he will still be found wanting in comparison. For although the supposed Parameshwar of the Aryas has no power to create anything, they still say that at least he has the power to combine things that already exist. But Jesus of the Christians could not demonstrate even this much power when the Jews drew him on the cross and said, 'If you now save yourself, we will believe you.' And yet he could not save himself though it was no big task; all he had to do was to combine his spirit with his body. The poor man failed to do even that. Thereafter his apologists spun the tale that he was resurrected in the sepulchre. Unfortunately, they did not realize that the Jews had wanted him to come back to life right before their eyes. Since he could not come back to life before their eyes, nor did he meet them after his resurrection from the sepulchre, what proof is there for the Jews, or any researcher for that matter, that he did indeed come back to life? In the absence of any such evidence, even if one were to assume that the corpse somehow went missing in the sepulchre, it would not prove that he had in fact come back to life. The best that could reasonably be asserted with any degree of certainty is that someone who wished to show a miracle must have stealthily whisked the body away. There have been many people in this world whose followers believe that their corpses had disappeared and that they had gone to heaven along with their bodies. Will the Christians accept that it might well have been so? ”

The booklet consisting of 38 pages, critically examines the major religions and their principles briefly..

== See also ==
- Writings of Mirza Ghulam Ahmad
