= Revealed Sermon =

1900 sermon by Mirza Ghulam Ahmad

The Revealed Sermon (Arabic: Khutba Ilhamiyya) was a sermon delivered by Mirza Ghulam Ahmad, the founder of the Ahmadiyya movement, on 11 April 1900, for the festival of Eid ul-Adha. The hour-long sermon, transcribed by Maulvi Nurud Deen and Maulvi Abdul Karim at Ahmad's request, focused on the philosophy of sacrifice. The sermon is considered a divine revelation by Ahmadi Muslims.

== Background ==
After the Eid prayers, Hakim Nur-ud-Din and Maulvi Abdul Karim, two of the companions of Ahmad, were asked to sit near Ahmad and were asked to record the speech to be delivered in Arabic word for word. After the Eid sermon was finished, Maulavi ‘Abdul Karim delivered a summary of the sermon in the Urdu language. While the summary was being delivered it is reported that Ahmad performed Sajdah (prostration) in order to show a sudden sense of gratitude to God. This was followed by the gathering. Ahmad saw a vision and after the sajdah told his people that he had just read the word Mubarak (congratulations) written in scarlet.

Ahmad wrote later:

It was like a hidden fountain gushing forth and I did not know whether it was I who was speaking or an angel was speaking through my tongue. The sentences were just being uttered and every sentence was a sign of God for me.

— Mirza Ghulam Ahmad, Haqeeqatul-Wahi

== Contents ==
The book comprises two parts. The first part is the actual sermon and the second part which was written later by Mirza Ghulam Ahmad discusses the philosophy of sacrifice and the advent of the promised messiah in the light of the Qur'an and the Hadith.
