= The Philosophy of the Teachings of Islam =

Essay on Islamic philosophy and teachings by Mirza Ghulam Ahmad

The Philosophy of the Teachings of Islam is an essay on Ahmadiyya Islam by Mirza Ghulam Ahmad, founder of the Ahmadiyya religious movement. The original was written in Urdu with the title Islami Usool ki Philosophy, in order to be read at the Conference of Great Religions held at Lahore on December 26–29, 1896. It explicitly deals with the following five broad themes with detail set by the moderators of the Conference:

- the physical, moral, and spiritual states of man;
- what is the state of man after death?
- the object of man's life and the means of its attainment;
- the operation of the practical ordinances of the Law in this life and the next;
- sources of Divine knowledge

The subjects of the soul, the threefold reformation of man, what is moral quality? Why the flesh of swine is prohibited, the attributes of God and heaven upon earth are also discussed.

In 1896, during the Christmas Holidays a Hindu named Swami Sadhu Shugan Chandra convened a conference of Great Religions at Lahore. A committee was appointed to oversee the arrangements. Six people were chosen as its moderators including the judge of the Chief Court of Punjab and the former governor of Jammu.

The committee invited representatives of the Hindu, Christian and Muslim faiths to set forth the excellences of their respective faiths. The main objective was to give them the opportunity to convince others of the truth of their religion through speeches. Each speaker was required to address the five themes set by the moderators and to confine his discourse to the holy scriptures of their religions. Among those who attended the conference were representatives of Hinduism, Freethought, the Theosophical Society, Christianity, Islam and Sikhism as well as various scholars, barristers, lawyers, professor, doctors and extra assistants, who numbered between 7 and 8 thousand.

The speech representing Islam was the essay written by Gulam Ahmad and though he could not attend himself due to poor health, it was read out by his disciple Mawlwi Abdul Karim. It could not be read out within the set time allotted for it; therefore the conference was extended to an extra day. The Report of the Conference of Great Religions said "The essay was delivered in four hours and from start to finish it was most interesting and well appreciated."

On 21 December 1896 Ghulam Ahmad declared that he had been informed by God that his essay would be the most overpowering one. He stated:

In the conference of Great Religions which will be held in Lahore

Town Hall on the 26th, 27th and 28th of December 1896, a paper

written by this humble one, dealing with the excellences and miracles of the Holy Quran, will be read out. This paper is not the result of ordinary human effort but is a sign among the signs of God, written with His special support...I have been moved by sympathy for my fellow human beings to make this announcement, so that they should witness the beauty of the Holy Quran and should realise how mistaken are our opponents in that they love darkness and hate light. God, the All-Knowing, has revealed to me that my paper will be declared supreme over all other papers... I saw in a vision that out of the unseen a hand was laid on my mansion and by the touch of that hand a shining light emerged from the mansion and spread in all directions. It also illumined my hands. Thereupon someone who was standing by me proclaimed in a loud voice: Allahu Akbar, Kharibat Khaibar (God is Great, Khaybar has fallen). The interpretation is that by my mansion is meant my heart on which the heavenly light of the verities of the Holy Quran is descending, and by Khaybar are meant all the perverted religions which are afflicted with idolatory and falsehood, in which man has been raised to occupy the place of God, or in which divine attributes have been cast down from their perfect station. It was thus disclosed to me that the wide publication of this paper would expose the untruth of false religions and the truth of the Quran will spread progressively around the earth till it arrives at its climax.

It was originally published in The report of the Conference of Great Religions and was later published in book form as Islami Usool Ki Falāsifi. It was subsequently translated into English. It has seen many editions and has been translated into French, Dutch, German, Spanish and various other languages.

== See also ==
Writings of Mirza Ghulam Ahmad
