= Muhammad Husayn Batalwi =

19th-century Indian Islamic scholar

Muhammad Hussain Batalvi
- Title: Mawlawi, Shaykh

Personal life
- Born: 1840 Batala
- Died: 1920 (aged 79–80) Batala
- Region: Punjab, India

Religious life
- Religion: Islam
- Denomination: Sunni
- Jurisprudence: Ghayr muqallid
- Creed: Athari
- Movement: Ahl-i Hadith

Abū Sayyid Muḥammad Ḥusayn Baṭālvī (c. 1840–1920) was an Indian Islamic scholar of the Ahl-i Hadith movement during the late 19th and early 20th-century in British India. A native of Batala in the Punjab, he became a student of Syed Nazir Husain Dehlawi and is considered one of the founders of the Ahl-i Hadith alongside him and Siddiq Hasan Khan. Batalvi was the editor of the magazine Isha'atus Sunnah and is best known for being a major antagonist to Mirza Ghulam Ahmad, the founder of the Ahmadiyya movement.

== Early life ==
Muhammad Hussain Batalvi was born around 1840 in Batala. His father, Sheikh Rahim Bakhsh, was an apothecary. In his childhood, he received elementary education, from Molvi Gul Ali Shah, a Shia, these were the times when Mirza Ghulam Ahmad also attended the same teacher. The two were to become lifelong friends, but intellectual foes. He received further religious education from Abdullah Ghaznavi at Amritsar, before proceeding to Delhi where he studied Hadith, logic and grammar from Syed Nazir Husain. After completing his religious studies, he returned to Batala in 1868. Muhammad Hussain married twice, he had seven sons and three daughters.

== Literary career ==
In 1878 he started publishing the magazine Isha‘atus Sunnah. It was a voice of the Ahle Hadith movement in the Punjab of the time. The magazine became quite popular and was recognized by notable scholars and Government Officials. When Sir Charles Umpherston Aitchison, Governor of the Punjab from 1882 to 1887, left the area in April 1887, he gave Muhammad Hussain, a certificate testifying to his ability and learning. Muhammad Hussain proudly records this fact. Batalvi was also involved in theological debates with scholars of the Deobandi school and the Quranist scholar Abdullah Chakralawi.

=== The term Ahle-Hadith ===
The Punjab had been a seat of violent insurgent activities by the Wahhabis for about fifty years from 1830 till 1880. The government had to send twenty expeditions to subdue the Wahhabi movement. The term Wahhabi had assumed a rather derogatory connotation in India and in the later parts of the Nineteenth Century. Wahhabism had been associated with militant insurgency in the Punjab and North West Frontier of British India. It was in this context that Batalvi requested that they be 'un-linked' from an unwanted impression of being Wahhabis. Batalvi wrote an application to the then Viceroy of India Robert Bulwer-Lytton, 1st Earl of Lytton that they be called Ahl-e-Hadith rather than Wahhabi, which was granted on 19 January 1887. He wrote himself: "Queen Victoria first named us Muhammadi, and then Ahl-e-Hadith."

=== Views on jihad ===
Batalvi advocated "to wield the pen" rather than resorting to the use of force and militant means, He wrote:

Some of our Muslim brothers believe that the present misfortunes of the followers of Islam cannot be removed without the sword. It is no use acquiring worldly education. However, looking at the present condition of the Muslims, this belief appears improbable."..."Brethren! the age of the sword is no more. Now instead of the sword it is necessary to wield the pen. How can the sword come into the hands of the Muslims when they have no hands. They have no national identity or existence. In such a useless and weak condition, to consider them as a nation is to exceed the imagination of Shaikh Chilli [a proverbial, comical figure in Urdu fiction].

In his book, Iqtisaad-fi-Massaiil-Jihad Molvi Muhammad Hussain wrote: "It is haram [prohibited] to wage Jihad against the British."

=== Hostility to Mirza Ghulam Ahmad ===
Mirza Ghulam Ahmad, who later claimed to be the Promised Messiah and Mahdi in Ahmediyya, was a lifelong friend of Muhammad Hussain Batalvi. They had been attending the same teacher in childhood. Batalvi's father Sheikh Rahim Bakhsh also used to visit Qadian. When Mirza Ghulam Ahmad wrote his magnum opus, the Barahin-e-Ahmadiyya, Batalvi wrote a very favourable review upon it, covering a good two hundred pages, being serially published in his magazine. Muhammad Hussain Batalvi wrote:

In our opinion, from the point of view of the modern age, this book stands unique in the history of Islam. No book has ever been published like it in the past, and we cannot say anything about the future, which is known only to God. The perseverance of the author in the service of Islam, through his life, his energy, pen, tongue, and every form of activity is almost unprecedented amongst Muslims. This should not be taken as Asiatic exaggeration. We challenge anyone to show us the like of this book. And the author of Barahin-e-Ahmadiyya is committed to the shariah of Muhammad, pious and upright in view of the experience and testimony of supporters and opponents alike.

Batalvi's opinion of Ahmad changed in 1891, when Ahmad published his various spiritual claims and declared that Jesus son of Mary had died his natural death and the Second Coming was a metaphor, referring only to the coming of a disciple of Muhammad who would be appointed to the spiritual station of Messiah. This prophecy, he claimed, had fulfilled in his very own person. This marked the end of a lifelong friendship and Batalvi turned into an arch enemy of Ahmad and his Ahmadiyya Community in his later life.

On 31 January 1891, Muhammad Hussain Batalvi wrote a letter to Ahmad asking him whether Ahmad had really claimed to be the promised Messiah. Ahmad thought it sufficient to write only "Yes" in answer. Because Muhammad Hussain had asked him to say "Yes or No".

In his later life Muhammad Hussain Batalvi took it for his life-mission to undo whatever Ahmad intended to do. He organised a Fatwa [religious verdict] signed by hundreds of Ulema religious scholars that Ahmad was an unbeliever, or kafir. He wrote about his former friend in his magazine Isha’t-us-Sunnah; that Ahmad was a "raving drunkard, intriguer, swindler, accursed, the one-eyed Dajjal, slave of silver and gold, whose revelation is nothing but a seminal discharge, shameless, the ring-leader of sweepers and street vagabonds, dacoit, murderer, whose followers are scoundrels, villains, adulterers, and drunkards."

"That the Qadiani is a Dajjal of this time, a second Musaylimah, perfidious, deceiver, cheat, liar and impostor, and that he is the enemy of the faith of Islam and all other heavenly faiths."

He also admitted [In the Court the District Magistrate Gurdaspur (1899)] having published the following:

"Had we been under Muslim rule, we would have given you (Ahmad) a proper reply. We would have at once cut off your head with a sword and made you a dead body".

In the alleged murder lawsuit against Ghulam Ahmad, instituted by Henry Martyn Clark in the Court of District Magistrate Captain Montagu William Douglas Muhammad Hussain Batalvi, appeared on the side of the prosecution, and sided with Dr Clark of the Church Mission Society against Ghulam Ahmad Batalvi also accused Ghulam Ahmad of sedition and rebellious intentions towards the British Government, likening him to the Mahdi of Sudan and warning the Government in the following words:

His deception is proved by the fact that in his heart he considers it lawful to put an end to the authority of a non-Muslim government and to plunder its belongings … Therefore, it would not be proper on the part of the Government to rely on him and it would be necessary to be aware of him, otherwise such harm might be suffered at the hands of this Mahdi of Qadian as was experienced at the hands of the Sudanese Mahdi.

— Ishaatus Sunnah, Vol VI, 1893

It is not possible to write about Muhammad Hussain Batalvi, without mentioning his lifelong struggle against the Ahmadiyya Movement of Mirza Ghulam Ahmad. Batalvi remained his major antagonist throughout his life. The Ahmadiyya missionary Abdul Rahim Dard who wrote the Life of Ahmad (1948) has termed him as the 'Caiaphas' of the latter days.

== The Ludhiana debate ==
This debate is known as the "Ludhiana Debate". It took place between Molvi Muhammad Hussain Batalvi and Mirza Ghulam Ahmad, lasting for twelve days, from 20 to 31 July 1891. The venue was the ‘Masjid Awanan’ (Awana's Mosque) at Ludhiana.

As stated above, the claims of Mirza Ghulam Ahmad to be the Promised Messiah and declaring the death of Jesus son of Mary, had very much perturbed Muhammad Hussain Batalvi. A lengthy correspondence between the two, finally led to an agreement upon holding a debate, on the basic issue or dispute: i.e. If Jesus son Mary had died a mortal death OR was yet alive (to descend in the Latter-days End time).

It was also agreed upon, that the debate had to be in the form of written papers, no oral argument or discussion will be allowed. It will be held in ongoing sessions, in the presence of the audience and judges. The papers would be read out and handed over to the other party for writing of a rebuttal. The debate lasted for twelve long days, and was attended by about 300 persons, including the local gentry and dignitaries like the editors of the Punjab Gazette, Sialkot, and the Nur Afshan, Ludhiana. Kh. Ahsan Shah, Hon. Magistrate of the town; M. Miran Bakhsh, accountant; Shahzada Abdul Majid, Dr. Mustafa Ali, Kh.Muhammad Sattar Shah, Kh. Abdul Qadir, Master Charagh Din, Munshi Muhammad Qasim, Master Qadir Bakhsh, and Miyan Shair Muhammad Khan. The sessions were presided over by independent Judges.

The issue of the life and death of Jesus did not come under discussion at all. The whole time was consumed by settling down the relative authority of the Hadith and the Qur'an. Molvi Muhammad Hussain wanted the status of Hadith to be clarified first, before taking up the real subject of the debate. The debate appeared to have reached a dead end on 31 July 1891. The written papers of both sides were later published by Mirza Ghulam Ahmad as Al-Haq Mubahathah Ludhiana (Urdu). [i.e. Truth: the Ludhiana Debate]

=== The Prayer Duel ===
After the unfruitful debate, and the unceasing antagonism of Batalvi towards Mirza Ghulam Ahmad, the contest entered the domain of a ‘Spiritual Duel’. Muhammad Hussain Batalvi, used to say [as he] had raised Mirza Ghulam Ahmad to the status of a Saint and ‘Wali’ by attesting to his Revelations (Divine Converse); and by writing a ‘Review’ over his Barahin-e-Ahmadiyya, in the Isha’at-us-Sunnah; and had thus raised him in the eyes of the masses, so now he was under obligation to bring Ahmad down for his fresh claims. He had challenged Ahmad to Mubahala:

'If you are a man and have any courage, then prove both your claims in an assembly of learned men—you will not come into the field—I challenge you to a Mubahala. Come out into the field of Mubahala and take an oath'.

He had prophesied punishment and destruction for Ahmad when he said:

'Otherwise He [God] would send down the severest punishment upon you and drive you to destruction'

Mirza Ghulam Ahmad asked Batalvi's permission to publish his ‘Revelations’ [Divine Converse] about Batalvi's tragic end Muhammad Hussain Batalvi happily granted this permission.

Mirza Ghulam Ahmad predicted:

اے پے تکفیر ما بستہ کمر، خا نہ ات ویران تودر فکردگر

[Transcription-Persian: Aye paye takfeer e ma bastha kamar, khana ath veeran too dar fikre digar]

'O thou, who hast girded up thy loins to have me declared an infidel, thine own house is desolate and ruined and thou art thinking of something else.'

== Death and legacy ==
In December 1991, Hadi Ali Chudhryi, an Ahmadiyya, conducted a research to locate the tomb of Muhammad Hussain Batalvi . A large number of important and elderly people were interviewed. However, no clues were found of Batalvi's tomb. It was found that the Cemetery where Batalvi was reportedly buried (which was situated in the vicinity of Baring Union Christian College) is now under use as agricultural land. Among the many important people interviewed, besides businessmen, local elders, newspaper reporters, government officials of the city of Batala, was also the eminent personality Prof. K N Thomas. Another significant government official of the Batala Wakf Board, Basit Ahmad Khan, expressed his complete ignorance of Batalvi's name or his Mosque, in the city of Batala.
