= Blessings of Prayer =

Book-Title Barkat ud Dua (1893)

Blessings of Prayer is an English translation of the Urdu book Barakātud-Du‘ā’ by Mirza Ghulam Ahmad, published in 1893. It was written in refutation of Muslim leader Syed Ahmad Khan’s rationalising expositions concerning prayer and as a correction of his principles of Quranic exegesis. The work upholds belief in the miraculous effects of prayer and outlines seven criteria for Quranic interpretation.

== Overview ==
Sir Syed Ahmad Khan was a prominent Muslim leader and activist contemporary to Mirza Ghulam Ahmad, noted for espousing Islamic modernist and rationalist ideas in India. In 1892, Khan published two books: Ad-Du‘ā’ Wal-Istijābah (Prayer and its Response) and Taḥrīr Fī uṣūlit-Tafsīr (On the Principles of Exegesis).

Ghulam Ahmad's wrote Barakātud-Du‘ā’ as a response to these works. The book comprises two parts. The first dealing with the effectiveness of prayer, argued that supplications offered in humility and sincerity were indeed accepted and that their fulfilment was in harmony with the natural course of things pre-ordained by God. Recourse to prayer was like recourse to medicine and pre-ordination or predestination did not preclude the exercise of power and control by God. The acceptance of prayer sets in motion its own chain of causes which culminates in the fulfilment of the objective prayed for.

The second part of the book, written as a corrective to Khan's principles of exegesis, outlines Ghulam Ahmad's own seven principles of Quranic interpretation, in summary: (1) interpretation of Quranic verses should be supported in the first instance by other Quranic verses; (2) hadith containing the prophetic interpretation of Muhammad himself should be accepted; (3) the opinions of Muhammad’s Companions should be consulted; (4) one should ponder over the meaning of the Quran with a pure heart and refrain from speculative interpretation and personal opinion; (5) the Arabic lexicon should be considered; (6) The order of the material world should be studied so as to understand the order of the spiritual world; and (7) the revelation (waḥy) and visions (mukāshafāt) of eminent Muslim saints (muḥaddathīn) devoted to the interpretation of Quranic teachings should be taken into account. Regarding the last criterion, the book also contains a parenthetical discussion on the phenomenon of revelation against naturalistic explanations of it.

== See also ==
- Mirza Ghulam Ahmad bibliography
- Syed Ahmad Khan
