= Minan-ur-Rahman =

Treatise on philology by Mirza Ghulam Ahmad

Book-Title Minan-ur-Rehman (1895)

Arabic - the Mother of all Languages - (Book) Minan-ur-Rahman [Arabic: منن الرّحمٰن ] is a brief treatise on philology by Mirza Ghulam Ahmad (1835-1908), written in May 1895. Ahmad claimed that Arabic was the first language taught to man by God Himself and the Mother of all languages (Arabic: Ummul-al-Sinnah). He highlighted certain peculiarities of the Arabic language, which he claimed could not be found in any other language and challenged his adversaries, to refute his claim also addressing Max Muller (1823-1900) to come forward and meet the challenge.

== Introduction to the book ==
Max Muller said that:

“I, therefore, date the real beginning of the science of language from the first day of Pentecost.”

Ahmad strongly reacted to this claim and referred Max Muller to the NT Acts II:4-6, explaining that the Disciples only spoke languages already known and understood by all the Jews Ahmad writes, he very earnestly prayed to God, and asked for true knowledge in this regard. So God diverted his attention to a verse of the Quran 30:23.

وَمِنْ ءَايَـتِهِ خَلْقُ السَّمَـوَتِ وَالاٌّرْضِ وَاخْتِلَـفُ أَلْسِنَتِكُمْ وَأَلْوَنِكُمْ
إِنَّ فِى ذلِكَ لأَيَـتٍ لِّلْعَـلَمِينَ

[The Quran, 30:23] And among His Signs is the creation of the heavens and the earth, and the diversity of your tongues and colours. In that surely are Signs for those who possess knowledge.

Ahmad claimed in light of Quranic verses:

"All praise is due to Allah, the Sustainer, the Beneficent. To Him belongs all Excellence, Grace and Goodness. He created man and taught him a plain language. And out of one language He created various languages in different countries just as He created various colors (of mankind); out of one color. And He made Arabic the mother of all languages. He made it the like of the sun in brightness and luster."

He claimed, the true Science of Languages has been taught in the Quran, explaining the unique characteristics of the Arabic language. "He created man then taught him speech and guided him " (page 85).

== Unique Characteristics of Arabic ==
In this book Minan-ur-Rahman Ahmad said that Arabic was the very First Language taught to man by God and that the system of Mufradaat [the Simples or the Roots of words] in the Arabic Language had a unique scientific organization and a system, unknown in any other language. He described the five peculiarities of Arabic and said all other human languages were derived from Arabic.

== The Mother Language ==
"The Arabic language possesses excellent qualities and signs which, in the eyes of scholars, invest it with the status of a Mother in relation to other languages, and these languages are like a shadow in relation to Arabic or like sparrows in relation to a preying falcon." (page 100).

Ahmad believed that Arabic, being the First Language, however, in due course of time, great changes in the structure and form of the vocal apparatus, man's ecology and environment, and many other unknown factors, caused a diversification of Arabic language into thousands of tongues, all derived from Arabic. He writes, quoting from the Hebrew Torah, Genesis 11:1:-

ויהי כל הארץ שׂפה אחת ודברים אחדים׃
"And the whole earth was one lip and speeches identical". (Gen, 11:1) [page. 14]

...the nearness or remoteness of a place from the equator, of the distinctive effect of the various plants, and because of other unknown factors, every locality inheres in its inhabitants a proclivity of a special kind, towards developing a peculiar voice-apparatus, a distinctive accent, and a form of words which is of a peculiar character....[page: 12]

He after commenting upon the relationship of Hebrew, or Sanskrit to Arabic, writes:

...all the languages of the world have come into existence through a process of far reaching change, yet by fully pondering over it, and by looking at the operative factors, it clearly appears that the speeches and words of these languages have been transplanted into a variety of shapes and forms from Arabic simples. [page. 16]

"Arabic is singular in its attributes, perfect in its root-words, wonderful in the charm of its compounds and captivating in the structural beauty of its sentences." (page 105).

== Five Points of Excellence ==
Ahmad highlighted Five points of the excellence of the Arabic language: [page. 17]

1. Arabic has a complete organised structure of roots, that is to say, the roots meet fully all the needs of human beings in the field of expression; the other languages are not so fitted.

2. In Arabic, the names of the Divine Being, the names of the principal constituent parts of the universe, of plants, animals and minerals and of the members of the human body, possess, in the why and wherefore of their contents, deep philosophy and learning.

3. The Additions and the roots of Arabic words are perfectly organised. The scope of this organisation, by linking into one philosophical chain, all the verbs and nouns, belonging to the same root, points out their interrelationships. This is not to be found, to this degree of excellence, in other languages.

4. In Arabic expressions, words are few but meanings are many, that is to say, the Arabic language makes use of (ا) [alif], and (ل) [laam] and nunnation (تنوین) and the sequence of words, in such a way that to express the same meaning the other languages need a number of sentences to be linked up for the same purpose.

5. Arabic possesses roots and expressions which are the perfect means of portraying the most delicate and deep things of the mind and human ideas.

A greater part of the book is devoted to manifest these characteristic in further details. He writes, " Thousands of languages are stricken with the calamity of a drawback that instead of root-words they make use of complex grammatical constructions, which shows that at a time of need such constructions have been invented by man." [page. 22]

== Arabic follows the Law of Nature ==
After the above Introductory details, the rest of the treatise is in a very lucid and elegant Arabic.[page 27-127] He explains that Arabic is unique to follow the patterns we observe in Nature. Two distinct features, i.e.'the pre-existing' Grace of God, like the bounties of Nature, the qualities inherent in the soil and earth, the sun and the changing weathers etc. And the second aspect being human efforts, labour and endeavours, these combine to give birth to the fruit of human endeavours. To fulfil these Two requirements, Arabic has Two distinct words for Mercy, Rahman [رحمان]and Raheem. [رحیم]. To explain his point, Ahmad writes:

It will be noticed that in as much this quality Mercy, in accordance with the eternal distribution process. consisted of two manifestations of the Divine Law of Nature. there are to be found two root-words in the Arabic language to express that fact. And for a seeker of Truth. it would be profitable to follow the rule that the Attributes and Acts of God which are prominently portrayed in the Book of Nature should be taken as a standard, that their different categories which are apparent from the Law of Nature should be searched for in the root-words of Arabic, and that when ever it is intended to point out the difference between Arabic synonyms, which relate to the attributes or the acts of God, one should turn to the division and distribution of the attributes or acts of God which are apparent from the working of the universe, for, the real object of the Arabic language is the service of Divine Knowledge, as the real aim of the creation of man is the recognition of the Creator. [page. 35]

== Ten Categories of Arabic Roots ==
Ahmad believed that Arabic was the Language of Divine Realization and designed to fulfill the Physical and Spiritual needs of man. He classified the Arabic Root-Words, into ten categories, calling them as the Ten Circles of Roots. He describes them as follows: (pp: 38-40)

1) Root-words relating to the Person of God, arguments for the existence of God, His attributes, His Names and Acts, His Practice and Custom.

2) The system of root-words relating to the Unity of God and the arguments on behalf thereof.

3) The system of root-words which deals with the attributes, acts, and actions, habits and situations, spiritual and physical, (of man) which, along with their mutual distinctions, are perpetrated by man and which may appear, in agreement with or in opposition to God's Will.

4) The system of root-words which constitute, as facts of Divine knowledge; a perfected teaching from God Almighty and which relate to inculcations or techniques dealing with morals, beliefs, rights of God, rights of men, philosophic learning, punishments, commandments, the Do's and Don'ts.

5) The system of root-words which expound the nature of true salvation, the true means or methods of obtaining it; the signs by which the saved believers and those who occupy a station of nearness to God may be recognized.

6) The system of root-words which explain what is Islam, what is disbelief, what is shirk or polytheistic belief and which deal forth with the arguments for the truth of Islam, and refute the objections against Islam.

7) The system of root-words which refute all the wrong beliefs of opponents.

8) The system of root-words which relate to warnings and tidings, promise of favourable or adverse happenings; which relate to description of the hereafter, to miracles and to parables or which are of the nature of prophecies which contribute to the strengthening of one's faith, or which relate to other expedient subjects, or which deal with narratives which are meant as a warning, a threat, or a tiding.

9) The system of root-words which relate to the life-story and chaste qualities of the Holy Prophet (May peace and blessings of God be upon him,) which consist of the high example of the pure life of the Holy Prophet; which also partake of full and forceful arguments in support of the prophet-hood of the Holy Prophet (may peace and the blessings of God be upon him.)

10) The system of root-words which expound the beauties and the spiritual effectiveness of the Holy Quran and which set out its inherent qualities.

== Further Contributions ==
A renowned Philologist Sheikh Muhammad Ahmad Mazhar (1896-1993) has contributed immensely to the work of Mirza Ghulam Ahmad and studied the various languages (around 35) and traced them to their Arabic Root-Words. The works, which trace the Arabic Roots, are the dictionary format, are easily available, can be downloaded freely by pasting the links in the browser's address bar. Most of the work is yet unpublished and in MSS forms.

The Source of All Languages [22MB pdf] - by Muhammad Ahmad Mazhar

Dutch and Swedish Traced to Arabic [4MB pdf] - by Muhammad Ahmad Mazhar

Egyptian Traced to Arabic [3MB pdf] - by Muhammad Ahmad Mazhar

English Traced to Arabic [26MB pdf] - by Muhammad Ahmad Mazhar

Hausa Traced to Arabic [8MB pdf] - by Muhammad Ahmad Mazhar

Italian Traced to Arabic [4MB pdf] - by Muhammad Ahmad Mazhar

Japanese Traced to Arabic [5MB pdf] - by Muhammad Ahmad Mazhar

Sanskrit Traced to Arabic [18MB pdf] - by Muhammad Ahmad Mazhar

Sumerian, Akkadian, Bantu Traced to Arabic [2MB pdf] - by Muhammad Ahmad Mazhar

Yoruba Traced to Arabic [7MB pdf] - by Muhammad Ahmad Mazhar

== Related Link ==
Islam Ahmadiyya - Arabic Website of the Ahmadiyya Muslim Community
