= Syed Nazeer Husain =

Indian Muslim scholar of the reformist Ahl-i Hadith movement (1805–1902)

Syed Nazeer Husain Dehlawi
- Title: Muhaddith, Shaykh, Maulana, Miyan Sahib

Personal life
- Born: 1805 Surajgarha, Bengal Presidency, British India
- Died: 13 October 1902 (aged 96–97) Chandni Chowk, Delhi, British India
- Region: India

Religious life
- Religion: Islam
- Denomination: Sunni
- Jurisprudence: Ghayr Muqallid
- Creed: Athari
- Movement: Ahl-i Hadith

Muslim leader
- Students: Abdur-Rahman Mubarakpuri, Muhammad Ibrahim Mir Sialkoti, Abdullah Ghaznavi, Muhammad Husayn Batalwi

Syed Nazeer Husain Dehlawi (1805 – 13 October 1902) was an Islamic scholar and leader of the reformist Ahl-i Hadith movement in India. Earning the appellation shaykh al-kull (teacher of all, or the shaykh of all knowledge) for his authority among early Ahl-i Hadith scholars, he is regarded, alongside Siddiq Hasan Khan (1832–1890), as the founder of the movement and has been described as "perhaps the single most influential figure in the spread of the Ahl-i-Ḥadīth".

== Biography ==
=== Early life ===
Husain was born into an aristocratic family in the northern Indian city of Monghyr, Bihar. He was raised a Shi'ite, but later abandoned that faith. He began his studies in Sadiqpur in Bihar where he first came into contact with the revolutionary preacher Sayyid Ahmad Barelvi (1786–1831) in the 1820s. He later moved to Delhi in 1826 where he studied under Shah Abdul Aziz (1746-1824), son of the revivalist theologian Shah Waliullah Dehlawi (1703–1762), and then Abdul Aziz's grandson and successor Shah Ishaq Al-Dihlawi (1778–1846), the renowned muhaddith in India. When Shah Ishaq Al-Dihlawi emigrated to the Hijaz, Husain took his place as a teacher. Self-consciously identifying himself with Shah Waliullah, and viewing himself as spiritual heir to his legacy, Husain took on the title miyan sahib, a title closely associated with Shah Waliullah's successors. At Delhi's prestigious Madrasah-i Rahimiyah seminary, which had broken up into a number of interlinked schools following Shah Ishaq Al-Dihlawi's death in 1846, Husain led the most Wahhabi-oriented school.

=== Attitude towards the British ===
Nazeer Husain advocated political quietism and was among a large number of Muslim scholars from both the Sunni and Shia sects who supported British rule and rejected calls for armed jihad against it. He was also among a number of Muslim scholars, including the muftis of Mecca, who declared British India to be dar al-Islam (abode of peace) and not Dar al-harb (abode of war). During the Indian Rebellion of 1857, he resisted pressure from the mutineers to call for a jihad and instead declared in favour of British rule, viewing the Muslim-British relationship as a legal contract which could not be broken unless their religious rights were breached. Despite having denied any involvement in the rebellion in its aftermath and having strongly opposed the declaration of jihad as sinful and a faithless breach of covenant, Husain was widely believed to have been among a group of Delhi ulema pressured into signing a jihad fatwa. He was arrested in 1868 by the British on suspicion of being the leader of the Wahhabi insurgents in Delhi and detained for six months but was eventually released without charge after it had emerged that he had not supported the rebels. Husain consistently denied any links with the Wahhabis as well as any role in the Delhi uprising in 1857.

Because he was seen by the British as the only scholar of the Ahl-i Hadith who could allay the conflict between the movement and followers of the prevailing Hanafi school of thought, which often resulted in civil disturbances that the Government sought to prevent, and because he also knew English which was very rare among Indian Muslim scholars at the time, Husain's turbulent relations with the British at Delhi had improved. He was granted a letter of recommendation by the government to the British Vice Consul in Jeddah when he travelled there in 1883 to perform the Hajj pilgrimage. However, he was already denounced as a Wahhabi by Indian Hanafis to the Ottoman governor of Jedda who had him arrested and imprisoned before he could present the letter. He was later released with the intervention of the British Vice Consul.

=== Founding of Jamaat Ahl-i Hadith ===
Within a couple of years of his release from prison in 1868, Husain, together with Siddiq Hasan Khan of Bhopal and Muhammad Husain Batalvi (c.1840–1920), two influential fellow alumni of the Madrasah-i Rahimiyah, formally founded the politico-religious organisation known as the Jamaat Ahl-i Hadith, the Party of the People of the Hadith. However, their zealous opposition against co-religionists and non-Muslims alike, to the extent of using violence against mosques and shrines, and their strong anti-polytheist, anti-innovation, anti-Shia and anti-Christian message in close resemblance to the followers of Muhammad ibn Abd al-Wahhab (1703–1792), did not stop other Muslim groups from denouncing them as Wahhabis. Neither did the British Government of India cease using this term for them until the Ahl-i Hadith leaders published, in 1885, a book denying any links with Wahhabism and called for the Government to cease employing this term in reference to them.

Husain taught hadith at Delhi for half a century, gaining international renown in this field and attracting students from different parts of India, Afghanistan, Central Asia, the Hijaz and Najd. Almost all of the major scholars of the early Ahl-i Hadith movement studied under him. Husain held together a network of scholars who aligned themselves to the teachings of Ahmad Sirhindi and Shah Waliullah Dehlawi, but were more uncompromising in their rejection of what they believed were blameworthy innovations in the faith and the legitimacy given to the four Sunni schools of law. The solicitude of the British also gained Husain favour among modernist Muslims associated with the Aligarh Institute, whose Aligarh Institute Gazette dedicated an obituary praising him when he died in 1902 at the age of ninety-seven.

== Teachings ==
The teachings of Nazeer Husain and Siddiq Hasan Khan were shaped amidst broader reformist developments in South Asia which saw the Muslims of India as having drifted away from 'authentic' Islamic beliefs and practices that compromised the Islamic concept of the indivisible oneness of God and bordered on idolatry. For guidance on religious matters, however, in contrast to other reformist currents in India, they advocated direct use of the central Islamic scriptures: the Quran and hadith – which they interpreted literally and narrowly – rather than looking to the classical lawmakers and the legal traditions of Islam that developed around them. Accordingly, Husain was known for his emphasis on the primacy of the Prophetic traditions as the source of Islamic law over deference (taqlid) given to the Sunni legal schools and for the opposition to popular rituals and folk practices associated with the Sufis which were deemed to be illegitimate innovations in the faith. Although Husain himself has been seen as less literalist and more favourably inclined towards Sufism than later exponents of the Ahl-i Hadith, demanding an oath of allegiance (bay'ah) from his disciples, a practice commonly associated with Sufism, and even praising Ibn Arabi, a colossus among Sufis. Nevertheless, overall, these teachings resulted in the development of close ties with Wahhabi scholars but strong controversy between the Ahl-i Hadith and the Deobandis who upheld strict adherence to the Hanafi school.

== Notable students and influence ==
According to author Charles Allen, among Syed Nazeer Husain's students were Imdadullah Muhajir Makki, Muhammad Qasim Nanotvi and Rashid Ahmad Gangohi, the founding figures of the Deobandi movement; although prominent Deobandi scholars including Mufti Taqi Usmani have issued fatwas against him. Husain is also considered by some scholars to have had an influence on Mirza Ghulam Ahmad, the founder of the Ahmadiyya movement, whose second marriage Husain had performed in 1884, though Ghulam Ahmad never studied under him. Prior to pledging his allegiance to Ghulam Ahmad and becoming his foremost disciple, Hakim Nur-ud-Din had also briefly studied under Husain. Other students of Husain included the Afghan-Indian scholar Abdullah Ghaznavi; the two major Ahl-i Hadith proponents in the Punjab: Muhammad Husain Batalvi and Sana'ullah Amritsari; and the Indian hadith scholar Shams-ul-Haq Azimabadi. The modernist founder of the Aligarh Movement and Muslim University, Syed Ahmad Khan, also studied under Husain in the 1850s.

== Works ==
Syed Nazeer Husain's Fatwas were collected posthumously by some of his students into two large volumes called fatawa Naziriyya. Other written works by him include the following:

- Mi'yar al-haq (Criterion for Truth; Urdu)
- Waqi'at al-fatwa wa dafi'at al-balawi (Event of the Fatwa and Defence Against the Affliction; Urdu)
- Thabut al-haq al-haqeeq (Proof of the Veritable Truth; Urdu)
- Risalah fi tahli al-nisa bi al-dhahab (Treatise on the Adornment of Women with Gold; Urdu)
- Al-masa'il al-arba'a (The Four Issues; Urdu)
- Falah al-wali ba 'itiba' al-nabi (Felicity for the Saint in Following the Prophet; Persian)
- Risalah fi ibtal 'amal al-mawlid (Treatise on the Erroneousness of the Practice of Mawlid; Arabic)

== See also ==
- Siddiq Hasan Khan
- Ahl al-Hadith
- Salafi movement
- Nasiruddin al-Albani
