= The Heavenly Sign =

Urdu book by Mirza Ghulam Ahmad

Nishan-e-Asmani (First published June 1892) (English: The Heavenly Sign) also called Shahadat-ul-Mulhimeen (English: Testimony of the Recipients of Revelation) is an Urdu book, by Mirza Ghulam Ahmad, the founder of the Ahmadiyya Muslim Jamaat. It contains commentary upon the prophetic verses of the 14th century Sufi saint Shah Nimatullah Wali (1330-1431) pertaining to the appearance of the Messiah and Mahdi as quoted by Shah Ismail Dehlvi (1779-1831) in his book Al-Arba'in fi Ahwal-al-Mahdiyin (1851). The English rendering of Nishan-e-Asmani was done by Muhammad Akram Ghauri, published by Islam International Publications.
