= Barahin-e-Ahmadiyya =

Book by Mirza Ghulam Ahmad

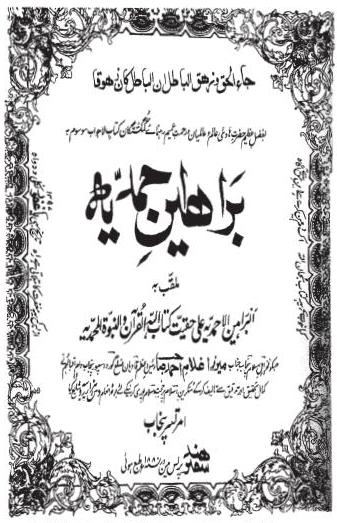
- Author: Mirza Ghulam Ahmad

Al-Barāhīn al-Ahmadīyyah 'alā Haqīqatu Kitāb Allāh al-Qur'ān wa'n-Nabūwwatu al-Muhammadīyyah (Ahmadiyya Arguments in Support of the Book of Allah - the Qur'an, and the Prophethood of Muhammad) is a five-part book written by Mirza Ghulam Ahmad, the founder of the Ahmadiyya Movement. The first two parts were published in 1880 CE, the third volume was published in 1882, the fourth volume in 1884 and the fifth volume in 1905. In writing the book, Ghulam Ahmad sought to rejuvenate Islam by arguing for the validity of its principles and vindicating its teachings in response to Christian and Hindu polemics against Islam as well as atheistic philosophies. In this context, a significant portion of the subject matter of the book is dedicated to the defence of Islam as a whole against the criticism of Muhammad, the Qur'an and Islam that was raised in the 18th and 19th centuries predominantly by Christian missionaries and Hindu revivalists.

Along with the publication of the book, Ghulam Ahmad issued a poster advertising a reward of 10,000 rupees (the total value of his property in 1879) for anyone who could rebut his arguments in favor of the divine nature of the Quran and the authenticity of Muhammad's claim to prophethood; or could present at the very least one-fifth of the 'excellences' as presented in the Barāhīn in favour of Islam, in favour of their own religion, scripture and founder(s).

The work was initially intended to be a fifty-volume series in the defence of Islam, however, Ghulam Ahmad's claim to be divinely appointed as the expected Mahdi and Messiah during the course of its writing and following the publication of volume four marked a major turning point in his life. The series thus ended with the fifth volume. The Barāhīn proved to be a useful source for the defence of Islamic doctrine and was critically acclaimed by many Indian Muslim scholars at the time, earning Ghulam Ahmad recognition as an expert in formulating arguments against Christians and Hindus among the intellectual circles of the Punjab. However, other aspects of the work proved highly controversial within the Muslim community itself because of the author's messianic claims and his claim to be a recipient of revelation.

== The Conditions for the Challenge ==
In the announcement contained in part one, Ghulam Ahmad sets out the form, conditions and criteria of the challenge and offers a reward of 10,000 rupees (total value of the author's property) to the respondent, provided that three judges agreed upon by both parties, 'unanimously give the verdict that the conditions' have been met.

- Anyone from the 'various religions and creeds' is invited to prove that their holy books are equal in status to the Qur'an by presenting such arguments in support of and derived purely from their central scriptures, as the author has done from the Qur'an in support of its truth and that of the Islamic prophet Muhammad.
- If one is unable to advance the same number of arguments as he has, then one may produce half, or one-third, or one-fourth, or one-fifth of them or at the least refute his arguments one by one.
- The permission to advance up to one fifth of the arguments does not pertain to the total number of arguments but rather to each "category of arguments" that is, (a) arguments based on the 'inherent excellences' or internal evidence of the truth of the holy scripture and that of the religion's founder; and (b) arguments based on external evidence, upon 'objective facts and established, recurrent events'. These two categories are further divided into the 'simple argument' and the 'composite argument', the former being that which is independently and in itself sufficient evidence of divine origin and truth; the latter that whose validity requires a set of mutually dependent arguments.

...anyone who intends to take up the challenge should, from each category of arguments, advance [from his own scripture] half of the arguments of the Holy Quran or one-third of them, or one-fourth of them, or one-fifth of them. This is in case he is unable to produce all the arguments that fall under one category.

- If he is unable to advance arguments from his own scripture or present even one fifth of the arguments in accordance with the conditions then he must acknowledge by a written submission that the 'inadequacy and irrationality of his scripture has rendered him incapable of fulfilling this clause.'

== Contents ==
The first and second volumes are largely introductory in their nature and present an outline of the book. Ghulam Ahmad listed six points to which the book adheres.

=== Part III ===
- It contains all the truths based on the principles of the knowledge of religion; all the truths put together can be called Islam
- It is claimed to contain 300 arguments for truth of Islam
- It contains answers to the allegations, accusations, objections and whimsical views of the opponents of Islam, like Jews, Christians, Magians, Aryas, Brahmins, Naturalists, Atheists, idol worshippers and non-religious people.
- It contains a discussion on the basic religious beliefs of other religions.
- It contains the explanation of the secrets of the word of God. The wisdom of the Quran becomes manifest throughout.
- All the discussions have been penned with great coolness and fineness and in perfect accordance with the rules of discussion; everything has been said in a lucid manner and understanding has been made easy.

In the third volume Ghulam Ahmad laments at the poor condition and plight of the Muslims and has shown great concern for them. The subject of external and internal proofs of the truth and excellences of the Quran (قرﺁن) are dealt with at length.

=== Part IV ===
The fourth volume discusses the need for the word of God (revelation). The excellence and uniqueness of Al-Fatiha (opening chapter of the Qur'an) and other verses of the Quran are discussed. A comparison is made between the teachings of the Quran and those of the New Testament. It also compares the nature of God as presented in the Vedas arguing that they do not address the idea of God's oneness and leave the concept of God unclear, open and miscible. Certain prophecies are made of which many people were told of beforehand. The miracles of Jesus, the meaning and nature of salvation and how it can be attained are also discussed.

Towards the end of this volume, Ghulam Ahmad claimed that he had received a sudden manifestation of God, the like of which had been received by Moses and that God addressed him saying Verily I am your Lord. Thereafter he was made aware of such secrets of 'spiritual heights' as could not be comprehended merely by human wit and intelligence. With this he declared that he no longer had any control over this book, but that it was God alone who knew how it would proceed.

=== Part V ===
This volume starts with a description of what constitutes a true and living religion and stresses the point that mere stories and legends of ancient times are not enough to establish the truth of a religion, it must have the continued miraculous manifestation of the words and deeds of the Almighty God up to the present. Any religion that is not true and is not living will certainly be devoid of these manifestations. He then continues to explain what a miracle really is and why it is essential for miracles to take place. He adds that living miracles and signs and not merely the stories of bygone ages are the sure sign of a living religion.

An extended supplement is attached to this volume. Ghulam Ahmad explains the unusual delay of 23 years to write the 5th Part (1905) of Barahin-e-Ahmadiyya; after the initial four parts (1884), during which period he wrote more than 80 other books. Ahmad explains that the delay was the Will of God, so that many of the Revelations, he received 23 years earlier and published in the initial parts, would have been fulfilled. He answers objections raised by some people; the death of Jesus is also dealt with in the light of verses of the Quran. After the supplement, Ghulam Ahmad intended to add an epilogue, the notes of which have been added. These notes explain what Islam really is according to Ghulam Ahmad, an explanation of the teachings of the Quran and the fulfillment of promises that he claimed God had made with him.

The fifth volume of the Barahin ends with an explanation of certain revelations which Ghulam Ahmad claimed to have received in which he was addressed as Jesus. About his claim he states (with which ends the fifth volume):

O men of God! You people know that when rain is held back and a long period goes without rainfall, its ultimate result is that even the wells begin to dry up. Therefore, just as in physical terms the water of the sky also dynamises the waters of the earth, likewise, that which is the heavenly water in spiritual terms (namely the revelation of God) is that which bestows freshness to earthly intellects. And so, this age too stood in need of heavenly water. I deem it necessary to say this much about my claim that I have been sent by God precisely at the time of need. This is the time when many have taken on the complexion of the Jews and have not only abandoned righteousness and purity of heart but, like the Jews of the days of Jesus, have become the enemies of truth. Thereupon, as a matter of contrast with them God named me Messiah. Not only is it that I call the people of this age to myself, rather the age itself has called me.

== Translations ==
The book was written largely in Urdu. Since 2018 all five parts of Barahin-e-Ahmadiyya have been translated into English, German and Arabic by the Ahmadiyya Muslim Community. Parts III, IV, and V have been partially translated into English by the Lahore Ahmadiyya Movement for the Propagation of Islam.

== See also ==
- Writings of Mirza Ghulam Ahmad
- Victory of Islam
- Noor-ul-Haq (book)
