= Noor-ul-Haq (book) =

Noor-ul-Haq (The Light of Truth) is a two-part Arabic book written by Mirza Ghulam Ahmad, the founder of the Ahmadiyya Movement in 1894. It consists of both prose and poetry. The first part was written in refutation of a book written by Padre Imad ud-Din Lahiz, a Christian preacher who had apostatised from Islam. The second part was written with regard to the solar and lunar eclipses which took place in 1894. With the publication of the book Ghulam Ahmad issued an advertisement with a reward of 5,000 rupees to anyone who could produce its like in terms of literary style.

== Background ==
In his book Tawzin ul-Aqwal, known for its highly critical and inflammatory nature, Imad ud-Din Lahiz criticised the style and language of the Quran, raised numerous objections against the personality of the Islamic prophet Muhammad and had criticised the concept of Jihad in Islam. He also wrote addressing the British government in India at the time alleging that Ghulam Ahmad who had claimed to be the Mahdi was working towards the overthrow of the government and was preparing to wage a jihad against the British authorities.

== Contents ==
In the first part of Noor-ul-Haq, Ghulam Ahmad has taken each objection individually and has written in their refutation. He then expounds the philosophy of Jihad in Islam and addresses the British government assuring them of his support and loyalty to any government which allows religious freedom, deals with justice and is sympathetic towards its subjects. There is a lengthy discussion in refutation of the Christian concept of the divinity and sonship of Jesus. With relation to Imad ud-Din’s assertion that there have been no saints or holy personages within Islam, Ghulam Ahmad suggests that Islam is the only religion which is not based upon the stories of old but is capable of showing fresh signs of divine support in the present age. Ghulam Ahmad asserts that the Islamic prophet Muhammad is the only man by following whom one can reach the status of perfect sainthood or nearness to God and that there have been numerous such personages within Islam. He presents himself as the prime and living example of this and indicates that he has been divinely chosen as the Mahdi by his complete obedience and love for Muhammad.

=== Challenge and controversy ===
Ghulam Ahmad explains that the reason why the book is written in Arabic is in order to expose the ignorance of the Arabic language on part of those Christian missionaries who claimed to be well-acquainted with the Arabic tongue, called themselves scholars of Islam and thus qualified to scrutinise the Quranic style. Their names are listed within the book. He challenges them to compete with his own writings in his claimed capacity as the representative of the Islamic prophet Muhammad; as an alternative to producing a book like unto the Quran to which (as is implied) his own book is a literary subordinate. Thus attempting to render their criticism of the Quran unqualified and unjustified. He offers them a respite of three months within which to produce a book like his and advertises a reward of 5,000 rupees if they succeed. During the course of writing the book, Ghulam Ahmad claimed to have received the revelation:

Should you be in doubt concerning Our support to Our servant, then produce a book like this one.

— Mirza Ghulam Ahmad, Tadhkirah p. 309.

Towards the end of the first part of the book Ghulam Ahmad has enumerated a thousand curses for those who, having refused to compete with him, continue to deride at the Quran, and revile the prophet of Islam.

But if they refuse to produce it and take flight and are not able to possess command over it, and continue their habit of deriding at the Quran and do not desist from criticising and inveighing the book of Allah. Neither do they bring to an end their reviling of the messenger of Allah on whom be peace and blessings and neither stop themselves from the absurd allegation that the Quran is not eloquent and do not leave the way of insult and contempt, then there is upon them a thousand curses from God the Most High, the entire nation should therefore recite Amen!

— Mirza Ghulam Ahmad, Noo-ul-Haq, Part I, p. 118.

According to his critics, Ghulam Ahmad's enumeration of a thousand curses in this book was excessively harsh. His followers however have maintained that this was in keeping with Qur'anic principles, was done so in order to provoke his adversaries into accepting his challenge and that such an approach was moderate when compared to the language used by Lahiz and other Christian critics of Islam at the time.

I call to witness the free and the bound that this day I place before the Christians a blessing and a curse. By blessing is meant the blessing of the world which they would gain at the time of this contest and they would gain along with victory and eminence a great reward, or by blessing is meant that of the hereafter which they would receive by repentance and relinquishing the abuse of the Quran. But the curse shall only befall them in the case that they do not produce a book as equal [to mine] and in spite of this, do not stop their abuse and insult of the Holy Quran. And it should be known that every person who is worth his salt and is not from among the progeny of ruined women and liars would surely choose one of the two proposals. Either hereafter he would desist from deception and allegation or will bring forth a book like ours.

— Mirza Ghulam Ahmad, Noor-ul-Haq, Part I, p. 123.

== Part II ==
When in 1894 the lunar and solar eclipse took place during the Islamic month of Ramadhan, Ghulam Ahmad claimed that it was in support of his claim and in accordance with prophecy that these eclipses had occurred. Subsequently, many Ulema objected that the prophecy found in the tradition of Dar Qutni and attributed to the 7th century Imam Muhammad al-Baqir was not an authentic one and asserted that the occurrence was not in accordance with the conditions mentioned in the Hadith. In the second part of Noor-ul-Haq, Ghulam Ahmad has dealt with the authentication of the tradition and has argued that the occurrence was in precise accordance with the prophecy. He advertised a reward of 1,000 rupees to those who would refute the arguments presented therein.

== See also ==
Writings of Mirza Ghulam Ahmad
