= Abdur-Rahman Mubarakpuri =

Islamic scholar

- عبد الرحمن مبارکپوری

Personal life
- Born: c. 1865 Mubarakpur
- Died: 22 January 1935 (aged 69–70) Mubarakpur
- Notable work: Tuhfat Al-Ahwadhi

Religious life
- Religion: Islam
- Profession: Islamic scholar

Muslim leader
- Teacher: Syed Nazeer Husain; Muhammad Shams-ul-Haq Azimabadi
- Students: Muhammad Taqi-ud-Din al-Hilali

Abdur-Rahman Mubarakpuri (born; 1865 – 22 January 1935) was an Islamic scholar specializing in hadiths.

== Early life and education ==
Mubarakpuri memorize Qur'an and studied Urdu and Farsi literature in childhood. Then from his father and other scholars he studied books on literature, essays and ethics in Farsi. He also studied for five years from Abdullah Ghazipur, president of Madrasa Chashme-e-Rahmat. And then studied hadith from Syed Nazeer Husain in Delhi. He studied Kutub al-Sittah and other hadith books from Husayn ibn Muhsin Al-Yamani Al-Ansari.

== Literary works ==
Sheikh Mubarakpuri has written books, including on the defense of the Sunnah of the Prophet. His books include:

- Tuhfat Al-Ahwadhi
- Abkār al-minan fī tanqīd Āthār al-sunan
- Al-Lubāb fī takhrīj al-Mubārakfūrī li-qawl al-Tirmidhī wa-fī al-bāb
- Fawāʼid fī ʻulūm al-Ḥadīth wa-kutubihi wa-ahlih
- Muqaddimat Tuḥfat al-aḥwadī

== Death ==
He died on 22 January 1935.
