= Maktoobat e Ahmad =

Handwriting Mirza Ghulam Ahmad

Maktoobat e Ahmad [Urdu- مکتو بات احمد; Letters of Ahmad (1878-1908) ] is a multi-volume collection of all available letters, written by Mirza Ghulam Ahmad in response to the queries and letters of his friends, companions and scholars. The volumes contain some exhaustive treatises on complex issues of religion and metaphysics as well as on matters of fiqh (Islamic jurisprudence) and Sufism. A 5-volume edition comprising these as well as newly-discovered letters was published in 2008.
