= Jang e Muqaddas =

Jang e Muqqaddas (English: The Holy Battle) was a name given by the Christian party to a written debate which was to take place between Mirza Ghulam Ahmad (the representative of the Muslims) and Abdulla Atham (the representative of the Christians). The debate started on 22 May 1893 and continued until 5 June 1893. The sessions were co-presided over by a Muslim, Ghulam Qadir Fasih, and a Christian, Henry Martyn Clark. The written papers of both sides were subsequently published by Ghulam Ahmad under the same name.
