= Mirza Bashir Ahmad =

Ahmadiyya religious scholar (1893–1963)

Mirza Bashir Ahmad (20 April 1893 – 2 September 1963) was a religious scholar and writer of the Ahmadiyya Muslim Community. He was the son of Mirza Ghulam Ahmad who was the founder of the Ahmadiyya movement and who claimed to be the Messiah and Mahdi awaited by Muslims.

He was born in 1893 to Mirza Ghulam Ahmad and Nusrat Jahan Begum in Qadian, British India. In 1916, he obtained an M.A. in Arabic. Over the decades, he wrote many books and articles on Ahmadiyya and Islam with the most notable being Sirat Khatamun-Nabiyyin (The Life and Character of the Seal of the Prophets).

He died in 1963 in Lahore and was later buried in Bahishti Maqbara, Rabwah, Pakistan along with his older brother Mirza Basheer-ud-Din Mahmood Ahmad.

== Works ==
- Seerat Khatamun Nabiyeen, Volumes I, II, and III (The Life of The Seal of Prophets)
- Seeratul Mahdi, Volumes I and II (The Life of the Mahdi)
- Silsila Ahmadiyya (The History of The Ahmadiyya Movement)
- Alhujjatul Baligha (The Perfect Proof)
- Tabligh-e-Hidayat (The Preaching of Guidance)
- Hamara Khuda (Our God)
- Kalima-tul-Fasal (The Decisive Word)
- Khatm-e-Nabuwwat-Ki-Haqeeqat (Truth of the Finality of Prophethood)
- Chalees Jawahir Pare (Forty Gems)
- Hayat-e-Tayyiba (The Immaculate life)
- Mazamin-e-Bashir (Collection of published articles)
