= Victory of Islam =

Victory of Islam (Urdu: Fatah Islam) is the first in a series of three books by Mirza Ghulam Ahmad, the founder of the Ahmadiyya Movement, wherein he extensively sets out and explicates his claims; the others being Tauzīh-e-Marām and Izāla Awhām. It was published in 1891 CE.

== See also ==
Writings of Mirza Ghulam Ahmad
