= Haqaiq al-furqan =

Haqā'iq al-Furqān (Urdu: حقائق الفرقان, haqā'iq-ul-furqān, lit. "Inner Verities of the Discriminant") is a 4 volume exegesis of the Quran compiled from the discourses and sermons of Hakeem Noor-ud-Din, the first Caliph of the Ahmadiyya Muslim Community. The work is in Urdu.

Noor ud-Din was known for his lectures on tafsir. He studied the classical Islamic sciences and was also a hafiz. He was well-versed in Hebrew and Arabic, especially classical Arabic. He was also a scholar of hadith, having memorized thousands of the sayings of the Islamic prophet Muhammad, and having deep knowledge of the Riwayah and Dirayah sciences (chain of transmission and contents of hadith) through his learning in various parts of India and Arabia.

== Features and themes ==
This tafsir is steeped in the classical Islamic style, utilising classical Arabic lexicon as well as the science of hadith to understand Qur'anic verses, and the author was an expert in both. It also has many Sufi undercurrents in the tafsir, often incorporating mystical and esoteric knowledge of the Qur'an in addition to exterior meanings.

== Contents of the commentary ==
- Volume 1: Surahs 1–3.
- Volume 2: Surahs 4-17
- Volume 3: Surahs 18-48
- Volume 4: Surahs 49-114

== See also ==
- Tafseer-e-Kabeer
