= Ahmadiyya Militia =

The Ahmadiyya Militia was raised during the 1947 Partition of India to protect members of the Ahmadiyya Muslim branch from communal violence, based on the guidance from their founder, Mirza Ghulam Ahmad, that violence could be used only in defensive wars.
