= The Fountain of Christianity =

Book written by Mirza Ghulam Ahmad

The Fountain of Christianity (Urdu: Chashma-e-Masihi) is a book written by Mirza Ghulam Ahmad of Qadian and published in 1906. The first English translation was published in Pakistan in 1970. It was written in response to William St. Clair Tisdall's book, The Original Sources of the Qur'an (Persian: Yanabi ul Islam).
