= Shams-ul-Haq Azimabadi =

Indian Islamic scholar (1857-1911)

Personal life
- Born: 18 July 1857 Azimabad, Patna, Bihar, India
- Died: 21 March 1911 (aged 53)

Religious life
- Religion: Islam
- Denomination: Sunni
- Jurisprudence: Ghayr muqallid
- Creed: Athari
- Movement: Ahl-i Hadith

Muslim leader
- Students: Abdur-Rahman Mubarakpuri
- Influenced by: Syed Nazeer Husain

Abu-al-Tayyab Shams-ul-Haq Azimabadi, (18 July 1857 - 21 March 1911), also known as Muhammad Shams-ul-Haq Azeemabadi, was a muhaddith, mujaddid and commentator of Hadith from British India. He is best known for writing the main commentary upon Sunan Abi Dawud.

== Biography ==
Azimabadi was born on 18 July 1857 in Azimabad, present day known as Patna, British Raj. and received his Islamic education from Syed Nazeer Husain and Lutf-ul-Ali Bihari (d. 1879 ce), a class fellow of Fazl Haq Khairabadi.

In 1894 he traveled to Mecca and Medina to perform the Hajj, and while there, he also had a chance to meet a number of scholars. Among the most important contributions of Azimabadi was the popularization and distribution of hadith and its literature.

Azimabadi had a very extensive library of Islamic manuscripts, which was considered to be among the best in India. He is the author of many books, but his most well known are the commentaries of Sunan Abi Dawood, which is called Ghayat ul-Maqsood in 32 volumes and Awn ul-Ma'bood in 14 volumes. Azimabadi was also known for his views on the qualifications for a Mujaddid, or redeemer, in Islam; by his reckoning, Al-Suyuti and Murtaḍá al-Zabīdī were two prominent redeemers.

In 1910–11 the entire country was in the grip of an epidemic of plague. In Bihar, Azimabadi’s district, Patna was severely hit by this disease. After visiting the city of Dianwan on 15 March he had himself an attack of plague and after six days, on 21 March 1911 he died at the age of 53.

== Works ==
- Awn al Mabud: a commentary on Abu al-Tayyib Muhammad Shams al-haqq al-azim Abadi's interpretation of Sunan Abi Dawud. 3rd ed. Beirut: Dar al-Fikr, 1979.
