= The British Government and Jihad =

- Author: Mirza Ghulam Ahmad
- Publication date: 22 May 1900

The British Government and Jihad (Urdu:Government Angrezi Aur Jihad) is a book written in 1900 by Mirza Ghulam Ahmad, the founder of the Ahmadiyya movement in Islam. An alternative title is the True Meaning of Jihad. It was published on 22 May 1900 and was translated into English in 2006, by Islam International Publications.

The founder of the Ahmadiyya Muslim Jamaat used the Qur'an and the Ahadith (sayings) of the Islamic prophet Muhammad to explain his view of the Islamic concept of jihad and says that Muhammad resorted to defensive war only after suffering thirteen years of brutal oppression. Divine permission to retaliate was granted for the specific purpose of self-defense, to punish aggressors, and to uphold freedom of conscience. He also said that the command to fight and retaliate was for that specific condition in which the early Muslims found themselves.

== Claims to be the Messiah and Mahdi ==
At the end of the booklet, Ahmad said that he was the promised Messiah and Mahdi:

I also have been given the help of the Holy Spirit. The same Mighty and Holy God Who

has descended upon me appeared to all Prophets. He appeared to Moses at Sinai, to Jesus at Mount Seir, and He shined forth on the Holy Prophet (may peace and blessings of Allah be upon him) at Mount Paran. He has communicated with me and said to me:

“I am the Highest Being for the worship of Whom all Prophets were sent. I alone am the Creator and Possessor and there is none like Me. I am not subject to birth or death. I have been informed that prevailing Christian beliefs such as Trinity and Atonement are all human errors in contravention of God’s real teachings. God has directly informed me with His own living word. If you confront difficulties, and people ask how they might know that you are from God, tell them that heavenly signs are my witness, my prayers are answered, and I am informed of what is yet to come. Hidden mysteries, known only to God, are revealed to me

before they are manifest publicly.(p. 37)

"Did this age not need the avatar [second coming] of Jesus the Messiah? Of course it did. Currently, millions of Muslims are ready to kill other people under the pretense of jihad. Indeed, some are unable to truly love a benevolent government even while living under its protection. They are unable to reach the highest levels of sympathy, and cannot cleanse themselves of affectation and pretence. There was therefore a dire need for the avatar of the Messiah. So I am that very promised avatar, who has been sent in the spiritual likeness, personality and temperament of Jesus the Messiah". (p. 33)
