= Mirza Ghulam Ahmad =

Indian religious leader and founder of the Ahmadiyya community (1835–1908)

Mīrzā Ghulām Aḥmad مرزا غلام احمد
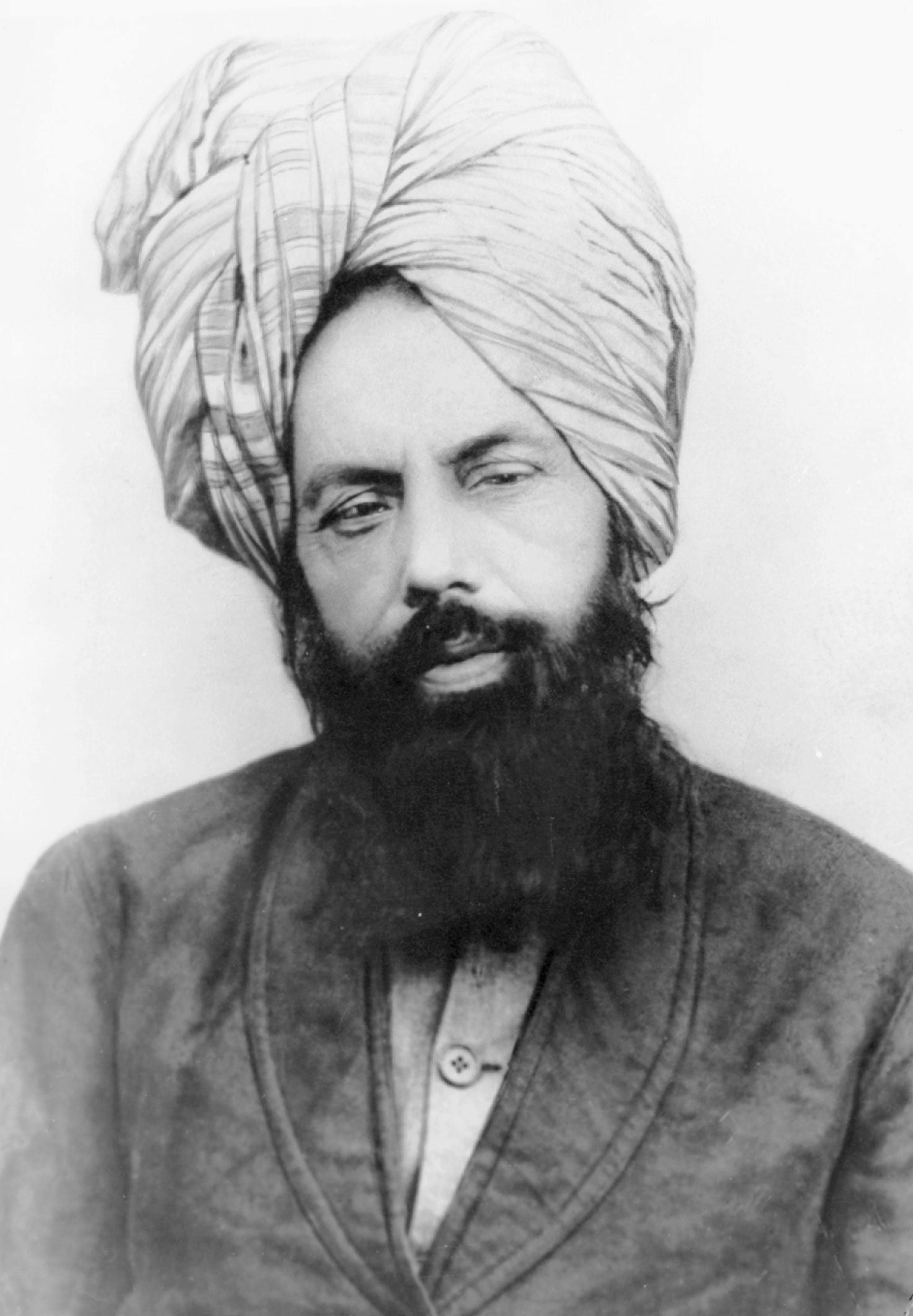
- Ahmad, c. 1897
- Born: 13 February 1835; Qadian, Gurdaspur, Sikh Empire (present-day Punjab, India)
- Died: 26 May 1908 (aged 73); Lahore, Punjab, British India (present-day Punjab, Pakistan)
- Spouses: Hurmat Bibi (m. 1852); Nusrat Jahan Begum (m. 1884)
- Children: List: Mirza Sultan Ahmad; Mirza Fazal Ahmad; Mirza Basheer-ud-Din Mahmood Ahmad; Mirza Bashir Ahmad; Mirza Sharif Ahmad; Mirza Mubarak Ahmad; Mubarika Begum; Amatul Naseer Begum; Amatul Hafeez Begum

Ecclesiastical career
- Religion: Ahmadiyya Islam
- Title: Founder of the Ahmadiyya Movement in Islam

Mirza Ghulam Ahmad (Note: Urdu: مرزا غلام احمد, romanized: Mirzā Ghulām Aḥmad) (13 February 1835 – 26 May 1908) was an Indian religious leader and the founder of the Ahmadiyya movement in Islam. He claimed to have been divinely appointed as initially the Mujaddid (centennial reviver) of the 14th Islamic century, followed by the claim to be both the promised Messiah and Mahdi, in regard to Islamic prophecies regarding the end times, as well as being Krishna, an Avatar of Vishnu, for the Hindus.

Born to a family with aristocratic roots in Qadian, rural Punjab, Ahmad emerged as a writer and debater for Islam. When he was just over forty years of age, his father died and around that time he claimed that God began to communicate with him. In 1889, he took a pledge of allegiance from forty of his supporters at Ludhiana and formed a community of followers upon what he claimed was divine instruction, stipulating ten conditions of initiation, an event that marks the establishment of the Ahmadiyya movement. The mission of the movement, according to him, was the reinstatement of the absolute oneness of God, the revival of Islam through the moral reformation of society along Islamic ideals, and the global propagation of Islam in its pristine form. As opposed to the Christian and mainstream Islamic view of Jesus (or Isa), being alive in heaven to return towards the end of time, Ahmad asserted that he had in fact survived crucifixion and died a natural death. He traveled extensively across the Punjab preaching his religious ideas and rallied support by combining a reformist programme with his personal revelations which he claimed to receive from God, attracting thereby substantial following within his lifetime as well as considerable hostility particularly from the Muslim Ulama. He is known to have engaged in numerous public debates and dialogues with Christian missionaries, Muslim scholars and Hindu revivalists.

Ahmad was a prolific author and wrote more than ninety books on various religious, theological and moral subjects between the publication of the first volume of Barahin-i-Ahmadiyya (The Proofs of Ahmadiyya, his first major work) in 1880 and his death in May 1908. Many of his writings bear a polemical and apologetic tone in favour of Islam, seeking to establish its superiority as a religion through rational argumentation, often by articulating his own interpretations of Islamic teachings. He advocated a peaceful propagation of Islam and emphatically argued against the permissibility of military Jihad under circumstances prevailing in the present age. By the time of his death, he had gathered an estimated 400,000 followers, especially within the United Provinces, the Punjab, and Sindh, and had built a dynamic religious organisation with an executive body and its own printing press. After his death he was succeeded by his close companion Hakīm Noor-ud-Dīn who assumed the title of Khalīfatul Masīh (successor of the Messiah).

Although Ahmad is revered by Ahmadi Muslims as the promised Messiah and Imām Mahdi, Muhammad nevertheless remains the central figure in Ahmadiyya Islam. Ahmad's claim to be a subordinate (ummati) prophet within Islam has remained a central point of controversy between his followers and mainstream Muslims, who believe Muhammad to be the last prophet.

== Lineage and family ==
Mirza Ghulam Ahmad was a descendant of Mirza Hadi Beg, a member of the Barlas tribe. In 1530, Mirza Hadi Beg migrated from Samarkand (present-day Uzbekistan) along with an entourage of two hundred people consisting of his family, servants and followers. Travelling through Samarkand, they finally settled in the Punjab, India, where Mirza Hadi founded the town known today as Qadian during the reign of Emperor Babur, his distant relative. The family were all known as Mughals within the British governmental records of India probably due to the high positions it occupied within the Mughal Empire and their courts. Mirza Hadi Beg was granted a Jagir of several hundred villages and was appointed the Qadi (judge) of Qadian and the surrounding district. The descendants of Mirza Hadi are said to have held important positions within the Mughal Empire and had consecutively been the chieftains of Qadian.

== Life ==
=== Early life and education ===
Mirza Ghulam Ahmad was born on 13 February 1835 in Qadian, Punjab, then part of the Sikh Empire under Ranjit Singh (r. 1801–1839). The surviving child of twins born to an affluent Mughal family. He learned to read the Arabic text of the Qur'an and studied basic Arabic grammar and the Persian language from a teacher named Fazil-e-Illahi. At the age of 10, he learned from a teacher named Fazl Ahmad. Again at the age of 17 or 18, he learnt from a teacher named Gul Ali Shah. In addition, he also studied some works on medicine from his father, Mirza Ghulam Murtaza, who was a physician. Ahmad's father, Mirza Ghulam Murtaza, was a local chieftain (ra'is) who served in the Sikh Army.

From 1864 to 1868, upon his father's wishes, Ahmad worked as a clerk in Sialkot, where he would come into contact with Christian missionaries with whom he frequently engaged in debate. After 1868, he returned to Qadian, as per his father's wishes, where he was entrusted to look after some estate affairs. During all this time, Ahmad was known as a social recluse because he would spend most of his time in seclusion studying religious books and praying in the local mosque. As time passed, he began to engage more with the Christian missionaries, particularly in defending Islam against their criticism. He would often confront them in public debates, especially the ones based in the town of Batala.

In 1886, certain leaders of the Arya Samaj held discussion and debate with Ahmad about the truthfulness of Islam and asked for a sign to prove that Islam was a living religion. In order to dedicate special prayers for this purpose and so as to seek further divine guidance, Ahmad travelled to Hoshiarpur upon what he claimed was divine instruction. Here, he spent forty days in seclusion, a practice known as chilla-nashini. He travelled accompanied by three companions to the small two-storied house of one of his followers and was left alone in a room where his companions would bring him food and leave without speaking to him as he prayed and contemplated. He only left the house on Fridays and used an abandoned mosque for Jumu'ah (Friday prayers). It is during this period that he declared God had given him the glad tidings of an illustrious son.

=== Taking of the Bay'ah ===
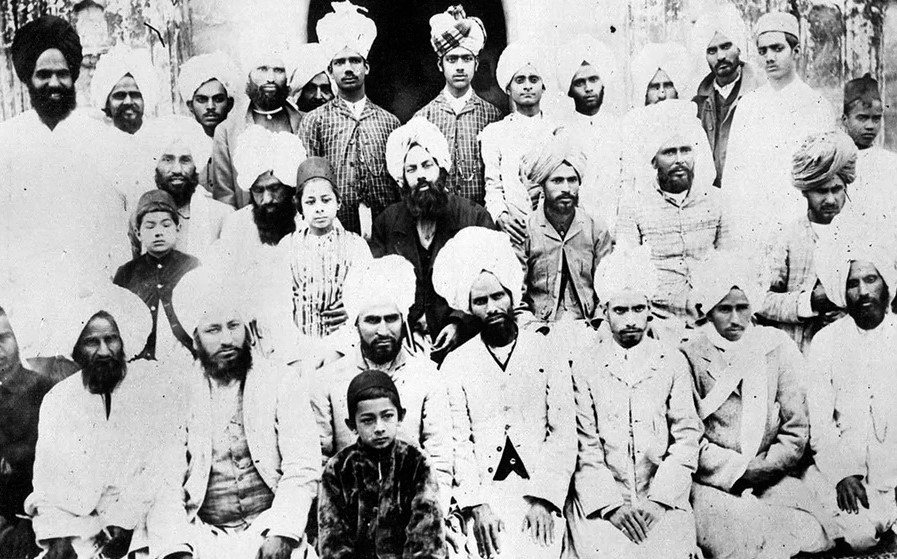
Mirza Ghulam Ahmad (seated centre) with some of his companions at Qadian c. 1899

Ahmad claimed divine appointment as a reformer as early as 1882 but did not take any pledge of allegiance or initiation. In December 1888, Ahmad announced that God had ordained that his followers should enter into a bay'ah with him and pledge their allegiance to him. In January 1889, he published a pamphlet in which he laid out ten conditions or issues to which the initiate would abide by for the rest of his life. On 23 March 1889, he founded the Ahmadiyya community by taking a pledge from forty followers. The formal method of joining the Ahmadiyya movement included joining hands and reciting a pledge, although physical contact was not always necessary. This method of allegiance continued for the rest of his life and after his death by his successors.

=== His claim ===
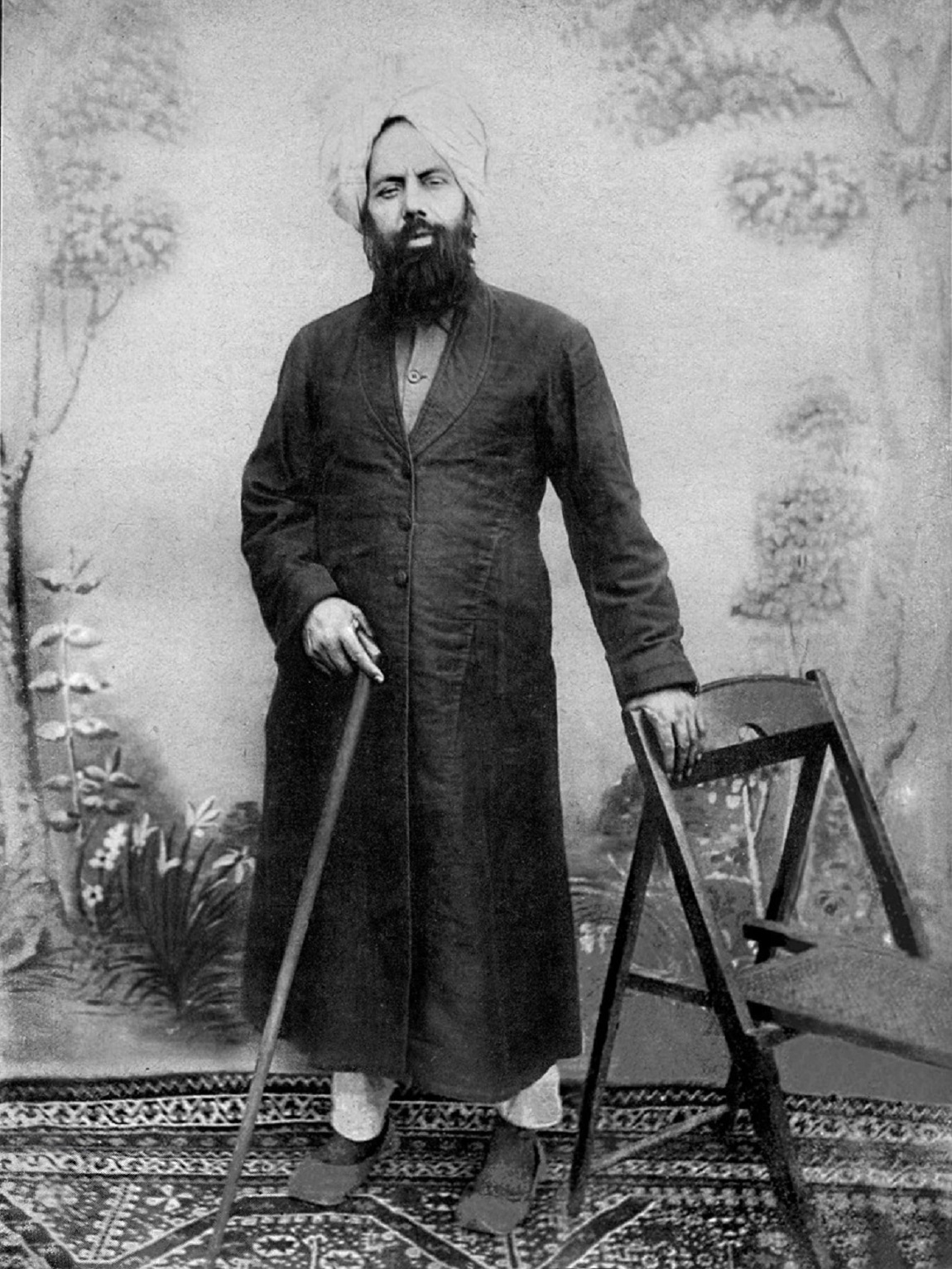
Mirza Ghulam Ahmad of Qadian, photograph taken in 1898

Mirza Ghulam Ahmad proclaimed that he was the Promised Messiah and Mahdi. He claimed to be the fulfilment of various prophecies found in world religions regarding the second coming of their founders. Mirza Ghulam Ahmad's followers say that he never claimed to be the same physical Jesus who lived nineteen centuries earlier. Mirza Ghulam Ahmad claimed that Jesus died a natural death, in contradiction to the traditional Muslim view of Jesus' physical ascension to heaven and the traditional Christian belief of Jesus' crucifixion. He claimed in his books that there was a general decay of Islamic life and a dire need of a messiah. He argued that, just as Jesus had appeared in the 14th century after Moses, the promised messiah, i.e. the Mahdi, must also appear in the 14th century after Muhammad.

In Tazkiratush-Shahadatain, he wrote about the fulfillment of various prophecies. In it, he enumerated a variety of prophecies and descriptions from both the Qur'an and Hadith relating to the advent of the Mahdi and the descriptions of his age, which he ascribed to himself and his age. These include assertions that he was physically described in the Hadith and manifested various other signs; some of them being wider in scope, such as focusing on world events coming to certain points, certain conditions within the Muslim community, and varied social, political, economic, and physical conditions.

=== Post-claim ===
In time, Mirza Ghulam Ahmad's claim of being the mujaddid (reformer) of his era became more explicit. In one of his most well-known and praised works, Barahin-e-Ahmadiyya, a voluminous work, he claimed to be the Messiah of Islam. Muslims have maintained that Jesus will return in the flesh during the last age. Mirza Ghulam Ahmad, by contrast, asserted that Jesus had in fact survived crucifixion and died of old age much later in Kashmir, where he had migrated. According to Mirza Ghulam Ahmad, the promised Mahdi was a symbolic reference to a spiritual leader and not a military leader in the person of Jesus Christ as is believed by many Muslims. With this proclamation, he also rejected the idea of armed Jihad and argued that the conditions for such Jihad are not present in this age, which requires defending Islam by the pen and tongue but not with the sword. Mirza Ghulam Ahmad wrote two books named Tuhfa-e-Qaiseriya and Sitara-e-Qaiseriya in which he invited Queen Victoria to embrace Islam and forsake Christianity.

=== Reaction of religious scholars ===
Following his claim to be the Promised Messiah and Mahdi, one of his adversaries prepared a Fatwa (decree) of disbelief against Mirza Ghulam Ahmad, declaring him a kafir (disbeliever), a deceiver, and a liar. The decree permitted killing him and his followers. It was taken all around India and was signed by some two hundred religious scholars.

Some years later, a prominent Muslim leader and scholar, Ahmed Raza Khan Barelvi, was to travel to the Hejaz to collect the opinions of the religious scholars of Mecca and Madina. He compiled these opinions in his work Husamul Haramain (The Sword of the Two Holy Mosques), in which he calls Ahmad an apostate. The consensus of about thirty-four religious scholars was that Ahmad's beliefs were blasphemous and tantamount to apostasy and that he must be punished by imprisonment and, if necessary, by execution.

=== Journey to Delhi ===
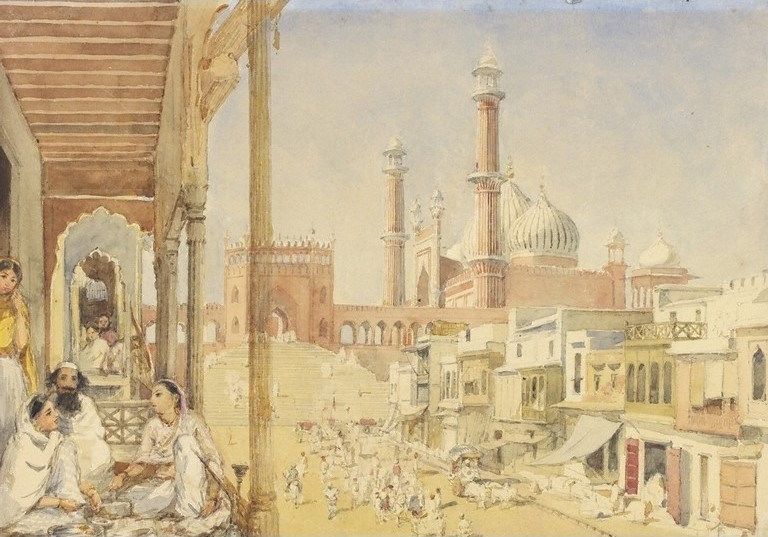
Jama Masjid, Delhi, 1852, William Carpenter

Ahmad went to Delhi, which was at the time considered a centre of religious learning and home to many prominent religious leaders, in 1891, with the intention of distinguishing what he believed to be the truth from falsehood. He published an advertisement in which he invited the scholars to accept his claim and to engage in a public debate with him regarding the life and death of Isa (Jesus), particularly Maulana Syed Nazeer Husain (1805–1901), who was a leading religious scholar. He also proposed three conditions that were essential for such a debate: that there should be a police presence to maintain peace, the debate should be in written form (for the purpose of recording what was said), and that the debate should be on the subject of the death of Jesus.

Eventually, it was settled, and Ahmad travelled to the Jama Masjid (main mosque) of Delhi accompanied by twelve of his followers, where some 5,000 people were gathered. Before the debate started, there was a discussion on the conditions, which led to the conclusion that the debate should not be upon the death of Jesus, but upon the claims of Mirza Ghulam Ahmad. He explained that his claim could only be discussed after the death of Jesus was proven, for Jesus was considered by many to be living and the one who will descend to Earth himself. Only when this belief was refuted could his claim to be the Messiah be discussed.

Upon this, there was a clamour among the crowds, and Mirza Ghulam Ahmad was informed that the other party alleged that he was at odds with Islamic beliefs and was a disbeliever; therefore, it was not proper to debate with him unless he clarified his beliefs. Ahmad wrote his beliefs on a piece of paper and had it read aloud, but due to the clamour among the people, it could not be heard. Seeing that the crowd was drifting out of control and that violence was imminent, the police superintendent gave orders to disperse the audience, and the debate did not take place. A few days later, however, a written debate did take place between Mirza Ghulam Ahmad and Maulwi Muhammad Bashir of Bhopal, which was later published.

Ahmad is known to have travelled extensively across Northern India during this period of his life and to have held various debates with influential religious leaders.

=== Challenge to opponents ===
Ahmad published a book called The Heavenly Decree, in which he challenged his opponents to a "spiritual duel" in which the question of whether someone was a Muslim or not would be settled by God based on the four criteria laid out in the Qur'an, namely, that a perfect believer will frequently receive glad tidings from God, that he will be given awareness about hidden matters and events of the future from God, that most of his prayers will be fulfilled and that he will exceed others in understanding novel finer points, subtleties and deeper meanings of the Qur'an.

=== The Sun and Moon eclipse ===
After announcing his claim to be the Messiah and Mahdi, his opponents demanded that he should produce the "heavenly sign" detailed in the tradition attributed to the 7th-century Imam Muhammad al-Baqir, also known as Muhammad bin Ali, in which a certain sign is stated about the appearance of the Mahdi:

For our Mahdi, there are two signs which have never happened since the earth and the heavens were created, i.e., the moon will be eclipsed on the first of the possible nights in the month of Ramadhan and the sun will be eclipsed in the middle of the possible days of the month of Ramadhan.

— Dar Qutni Vol. 1, page 188

Ahmadis maintain that this prophecy was fulfilled in 1894 and again in 1895, about three years after Ahmad proclaimed himself to be the Promised Mahdi and Messiah, with the lunar and solar eclipse during the month of Ramadhan, according to the Ahmadiyya interpretation of the prophecy. Ahmad declared that this was a sign of his truth and was in fulfillment of the tradition or prophecy. The eclipses being a sign of the Mahdi are also mentioned specifically in the Letters of Rabbani by Ahmad Sirhindi.

Scientific historical records indicate these eclipses occurred at the following dates:

Eclipse	Date
Partial lunar eclipse	1894 March 21 2pm UT (7pm)
Hybrid solar eclipse	1894 April 6 4am-7am UT (9am-11am)
Total lunar eclipse	1895 March 11 03:39 UT
Partial solar eclipse	1895 March 23, 10:10 UT

=== Lawsuit ===
In 1897, a Christian missionary, Henry Martyn Clark, filed a lawsuit of attempted murder against Ahmad at the court of District Magistrate Captain Montagu William Douglas in the city of Ludhiana. The charge laid against him was that he hired a man by the name of Abdul Hameed to assassinate Clark. However, he was not detained by the police and was declared innocent by the then-magistrate Captain Douglas.

=== The Revealed Sermon ===
In 1900, on the occasion of the festival of Eid ul-Adha, he is said to have delivered an hour-long sermon extempore in Arabic expounding the meaning and philosophy of sacrifice. This episode is celebrated as one of the important events of the history of Ahmadiyya. The sermon was simultaneously written down by two of his companions and came to be known as the Khutba Ilhamiyya, the revealed or inspired sermon. Ahmadiyya literature states that during this sermon, there was a change in his voice, he appeared as if in a trance, in the grip of an unseen hand, and as if a voice from the unknown had made him its mouthpiece. After the sermon ended, Ahmad fell into prostration, followed by the rest of the congregation, as a sign of gratitude towards God.

Ahmad wrote later:

It was like a hidden fountain gushing forth and I did not know whether it was I who was speaking or an angel was speaking through my tongue. The sentences were just being uttered and every sentence was a sign of God for me.

— Mirza Ghulam Ahmad, Haqeeqatul-Wahi

=== Challenge to John Alexander Dowie ===
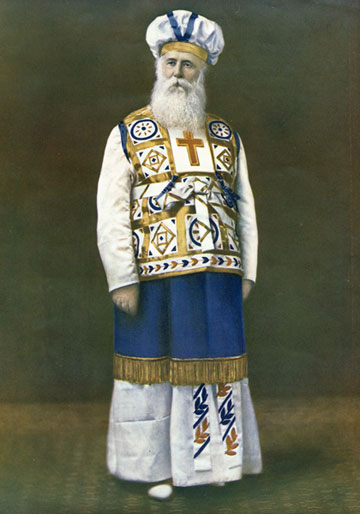
Alexander Dowie in his robes as "Elijah the Restorer"

In 1899, Scottish-born American clergyman John Alexander Dowie laid claim to be the forerunner of the second coming of Christ. Ahmad exchanged a series of letters with him between 1903 and 1907. Ahmad challenged him to a prayer duel, where both would call upon God to expose the other as a false prophet. Ahmad stated:

The best way to determine whether Dowie's God is true or ours, is that Mr. Dowie should stop making prophecies about the destruction of all Muslims. Instead he should keep me alone in his mind and pray that if one of us is fabricating a lie, he should die before the other.

— Ghulam Ahmad

Dowie declined the challenge, calling Mirza Ghulam Ahmad the "silly Mohammedan Messiah". Ahmad prophesied:

Though he may try hard as he can to fly from death which awaits him, yet his flight from such a contest will be nothing less than death to him; and calamity will certainly overtake his Zion, for he must bear the consequences either of the acceptance of the challenge or its refusal. He will depart this life with great sorrow and torment during my lifetime.

The challenge of "prayer duel" was made by Mirza in September 1902. The Dictionary of American Biography states that after having been deposed during a revolt in which his own family was involved, Dowie endeavoured to recover his authority via the law courts without success and that he may have been a victim of some form of mania, as he suffered from hallucinations during his last illness. Dowie died before Mirza, in March 1907.

=== Encounter with the Agapemonites ===
In September 1902 the Rev. John Hugh Smyth-Pigott (1852-1927) proclaimed himself the Messiah and also claimed to be God while preaching in the Church known as "The Ark of the Covenant" in Clapton in London. This church was originally built by the Agapemonites, a religious movement founded by the Anglican priest Henry James Prince. Mirza Ghulam Ahmad wrote to Smyth-Pigott, informing him that such a blasphemous proposition did not behove man, and that in the future he should abstain from making such claims, or he would be destroyed. Mirza Ghulam Ahmad also added that should Smyth-Pigott not die within his lifetime, then this would falsify Ahmad's claim to messiahship, writing that "if I die before Mr. Pigott, I am not the true Messiah nor am I from God." This message was sent in November 1902. Newspapers in America and Europe published Mirza Ghulam Ahmad's notification. Despite this prophecy, Smyth-Piggot continued to claim divinity both before and after Mirza Ghulam's death in 1908, as reported by various contemporary newspapers at the time.

=== Last journey ===
Towards the end of 1907 and early 1908, Mirza Ghulam Ahmad claimed to have received numerous revelations informing him of his imminent death. In April 1908, he travelled to Lahore with his family and companions. Here, he gave many lectures. A banquet was arranged for dignitaries where Ahmad, upon request, spoke for some two hours explaining his claims, teachings and speaking in refutation of objections raised against his person; here, he preached reconciliation between Hindus and Muslims. He completed writing his last work, entitled Message of Peace, a day before his death.

=== Death ===
Ahmad was in Lahore at the home of Dr. Syed Muhammad Hussain (who was also his physician), when, on 26 May 1908, he died from dysentery. His body was subsequently taken to Qadian and buried there; he had previously claimed that an angel had told him that he would be buried there. By the time of his death, he had gathered an estimated 400,000 followers, especially within the United Provinces, the Punjab and Sindh.

== Marriages and children ==
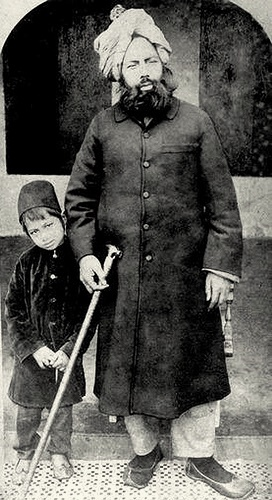
Mirza Ghulam Ahmad with his son, Mirza Sharif Ahmad.

Mirza Ghulam Ahmad married twice. His first wife was his maternal cousin Hurmat Bibi. When Ahmad remarried, they separated.

=== Children ===
With his first wife, Hurmat Bibi, he had two sons:

1. Mirza Sultan Ahmad (1853 – 2 July 1931)
2. Mirza Fazal Ahmad (1855 – 1904)

With his second wife, Nusrat Jahan Begum, he had ten children, five of whom died in infancy:

1. Ismat (15 April 1886 – July 1891)
2. Bashir (7 August 1887 – 4 November 1888)
3. Mirza Basheer-ud-Din Mahmood Ahmad (12 January 1889 – 8 November 1965)
4. Shaukat (1891 – 1892)
5. Mirza Bashir Ahmad (20 April 1893 – 2 September 1963)
6. Mirza Sharif Ahmad (24 May 1895 – 26 December 1961)
7. (Nawab) Mubarika Begum (2 March 1897 – 23 May 1977)
8. Mubarik (14 June 1899 – 16 September 1907)
9. Amtul Naseer (28 January 1903 – 3 December 1903)
10. (Nawab) Amtul Hafeez Begum (25 June 1904 – 6 May 1987)

== Legacy ==
Although Mirza Ghulam Ahmad aroused much opposition particularly from Muslim leaders owing to his messianic claims, opinion of him was not entirely negative. Many leading Muslim scholars, theologians and prominent journalists who were his contemporaries or had come into contact with him, had, despite differing with him in matters of belief, praised his personal character and acclaimed his works in the cause of Islam and the manner of his argumentation against proclaimants of other religions. The teachings that Jesus survived crucifixion, migrating towards the east in search of the Israelite tribes that had settled there and that he died a natural death upon earth, as propounded by Ahmad, have been a source of ongoing friction with the Christian church since they challenge the core beliefs of Christianity and would nullify the doctrines of vicarious atonement and resurrection, the two principal tenets of Christianity. Western scholars and historians have acknowledged this fact as one of the features of Ahmad's legacy.

Ahmad was the first to propose a post-crucifixion journey to India for Jesus and the first—other than the local people—to identify the Roza Bal shrine in Kashmir as the tomb of Jesus. These ideas have been further expanded upon since his death in light of subsequent findings, both by Ahmadis and individuals independent of the Ahmadiyya movement. Jesus' survival of crucifixion and his natural death have become an important element of Ahmadi belief and Ahmadis have published extensively on this topic.

A number of modern Muslim scholars and Muslim intellectuals seem to conform to the idea of Jihad as fundamentally a peaceful religious endeavour rather than chiefly (or unconditionally) a militaristic struggle, in accordance with Ahmad's standpoint on the issue. Furthermore, some Islamic scholars have opined that Jesus has died (Ahmad's assertion) or have expressed their own confusion on this matter, though this has been rare, and the orthodox position of most Muslims with regard to this issue has not changed.

One of the main sources of dispute during his lifetime and continuing since then is Ahmad's use of the terms nabi ("prophet") and rasul ("messenger") when referring to himself. All non-Ahmadi Muslims consider Muhammad to be the last of the prophets and believe that Ahmad's use of these terms is a violation of the concept of the Finality of Prophethood. His followers fall into two factions in this regard. The Ahmadiyya Muslim Community, which comprises by far the majority of Ahmadis, believes that Ahmad's prophetic status does not in any way infringe the finality of Muhammad's prophethood – to which it is wholly subservient and from which it is inseparable – and is in accordance with scriptural prophecies concerning the advent of the Messiah in Islam. This group is currently headed by Ahmad's fifth caliph, or successor, carrying the title of Khalifatul Masih, an institution believed to have been established soon after his death. The Lahore Ahmadiyya Movement, which comprises a small fraction of all Ahmadis and believes in an allegorical understanding of these terms with reference to Ahmad, formed in 1914 when a number of prominent Ahmadis seceded from the main body soon after the election of Mirza Mahmud Ahmad as the second caliph. This group is administered by a body of people called the Anjuman Ishaat-e-Islam ("Movement for the Propagation of Islam"), headed by an Emir.

The movement initiated by Ahmad, which is often seen to have emerged as an Islamic religious response to the Christian and Arya Samaj missionary activity widespread in 19th-century India, and is viewed by its adherents as embodying the promised latter day revival of Islam, has since grown in organisational strength and in its own missionary programme under the leadership of its caliphate. Although it has expanded to over 200 countries and territories of the world, numbering an estimated 10 to 20 million, it has received a largely negative (often hostile) response from mainstream Muslims who view Ahmad as a false messiah and his teachings as heretical, particularly the teaching that he was a prophet.

Pakistan is the only state that specifically requires every Pakistani Muslim to denigrate Ahmad as an impostor and his followers as non-Muslims when applying for a passport or a national ID card.

== See also ==
- Ahmadiyya Caliphate
- Jesus in Ahmadiyya Islam
- List of founders of religious traditions
- List of Mahdi claimants
- List of people claimed to be Jesus
- Mirza Ghulam Ahmad bibliography
- Mujaddid
- Seal of the Prophets

== Bibliography ==
- Friedmann, Yohanan (2003). Prophecy Continuous: Aspects of Ahmadi Religious Thought and Its Medieval Background. Oxford: Oxford University Press. ISBN 0-19-566252-0.
- Khan, Adil Hussain (2015). From Sufism to Ahmadiyya: A Muslim Minority Movement in South Asia. Bloomington: Indiana University Press. ISBN 978-0-253-01529-7.
- The Essence of Islam, Islam International Publications, Ltd.; 2nd edition (2004), ISBN 1-85372-765-2
- Iain Adamson: Ahmad, The Guided One, Islam International Publications, 1990, revised 1991.
- Jesus in India, Ahmadiyya Muslim Foreign Mission Department, 1978, ISBN 978-1-85372-723-8; Original Masih Hindustan Mein, Oriental & Religious Publications Ltd., Rabwah (Online)
- Korbel, Jonathan; Preckel, Claudia (2016). "Ghulām Aḥmad al-Qādiyānī: The Messiah of the Christians—Peace upon Him—in India (India, 1908)". In Bentlage, Björn; Eggert, Marion; Krämer, Hans-Martin; Reichmuth, Stefan (eds.). Religious Dynamics under the Impact of Imperialism and Colonialism. Numen Book Series. Vol. 154. Leiden: Brill Publishers. pp. 426–442. doi:10.1163/9789004329003_034. ISBN 978-90-04-32511-1.
- S. R. Valentine, 'Islam & the Ahmadiyya Jama'at', Hurst & Co, London/New York, 2008
