= Anwaar Mosque =

Mosque in Darul Anwaar, Qadian, India

- مسجد انوار; Masjid Anwaar
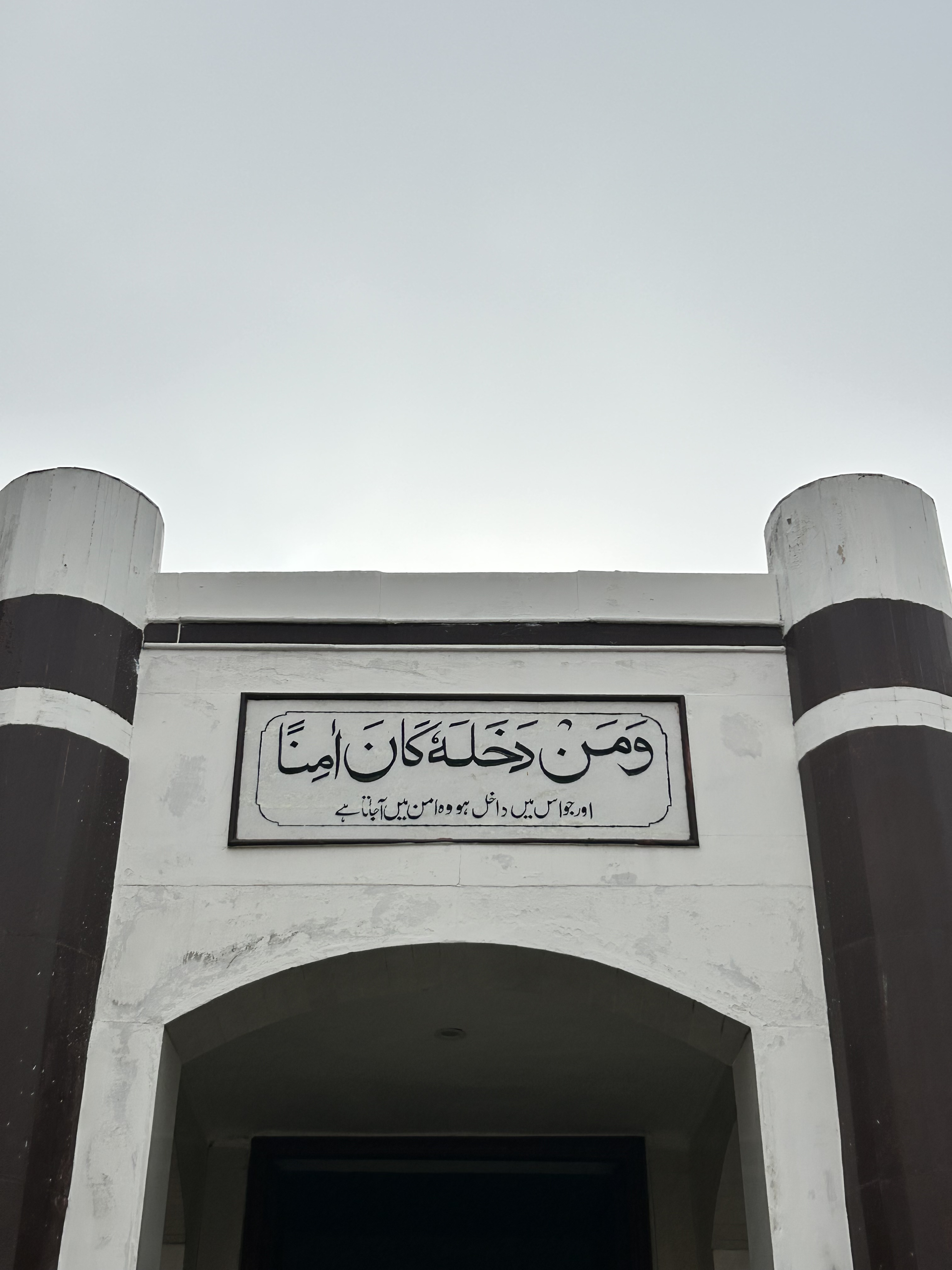

Religion
- Affiliation: Islam
- Branch/tradition: Ahmadiyya

Location
- Location: Qadian, Punjab, India
- Interactive map of Anwaar Mosque
- Coordinates: 31°48′53.441″N 75°23′6.63″E

Architecture
- Type: mosque
- Style: Islamic
- Established: 1940
- Completed: 2008

Specifications
- Capacity: 1700
- Dome: 2
- Minaret: 1
- Site area: 11000 square ft

Anwaar Mosque (Urdu: مسجد انوار, lit. 'Mosque of the splendour') is an Indian mosque located in the Darul Anwaar neighbourhood of Qadian. It was built in 1940 and is located adjacent to the Jamia Ahmadiyya Qadian. It has a capacity of around 1700 worshippers. The mosque has hosted several events and conferences.

== History ==
The construction of the mosque began in 1939 and inaugurated on 22 March 1940 by the second caliph of the Ahmadiyya Muslim Community, Mirza Basheer-ud-Din Mahmood Ahmad by offering Salah. During this time it was known as the 'Masjid Darul Anwaar', due to being located in the Darul Anwaar neighborhood and is often still referred to by this name. The capacity of the original mosque was 150 worshippers.

=== Expansion ===
The mosque was extended subsequently after the relocation of Jamia Ahmadiyya Qadian to Sarai Tahir, along with several other departments and the increasing population of the neighborhood, leaving the mosque overcrowded. Thus, in August 2007 the works for the expansion of the mosque began which was completed in December 2008, whence it was named "Masjid Anwaar". The building was constructed de novo, incorporating the old mosque.

=== Partition of Indian subcontinent ===
Following the partition of India, the mosque remained closed for a period of time and fell into a state of disrepair until 1991, alongside the construction of guest houses in Darul Anwaar, the mosque was repaired and restored.

== Architecture ==
The mosque in its current form was designed by architect Abdul Rasheed. It has several features:

- It has one large central dome and one smaller dome
- 1 big minaret

The entrance of the mosque has the phrase etched:

وَمَنْ دَخَلَهُ كَانَ اٰمِنًا
اور جو اس میں داخل ہو وہ امن میں آ جاتا ہے

And whoso enters it shall be at peace

== Gallery ==
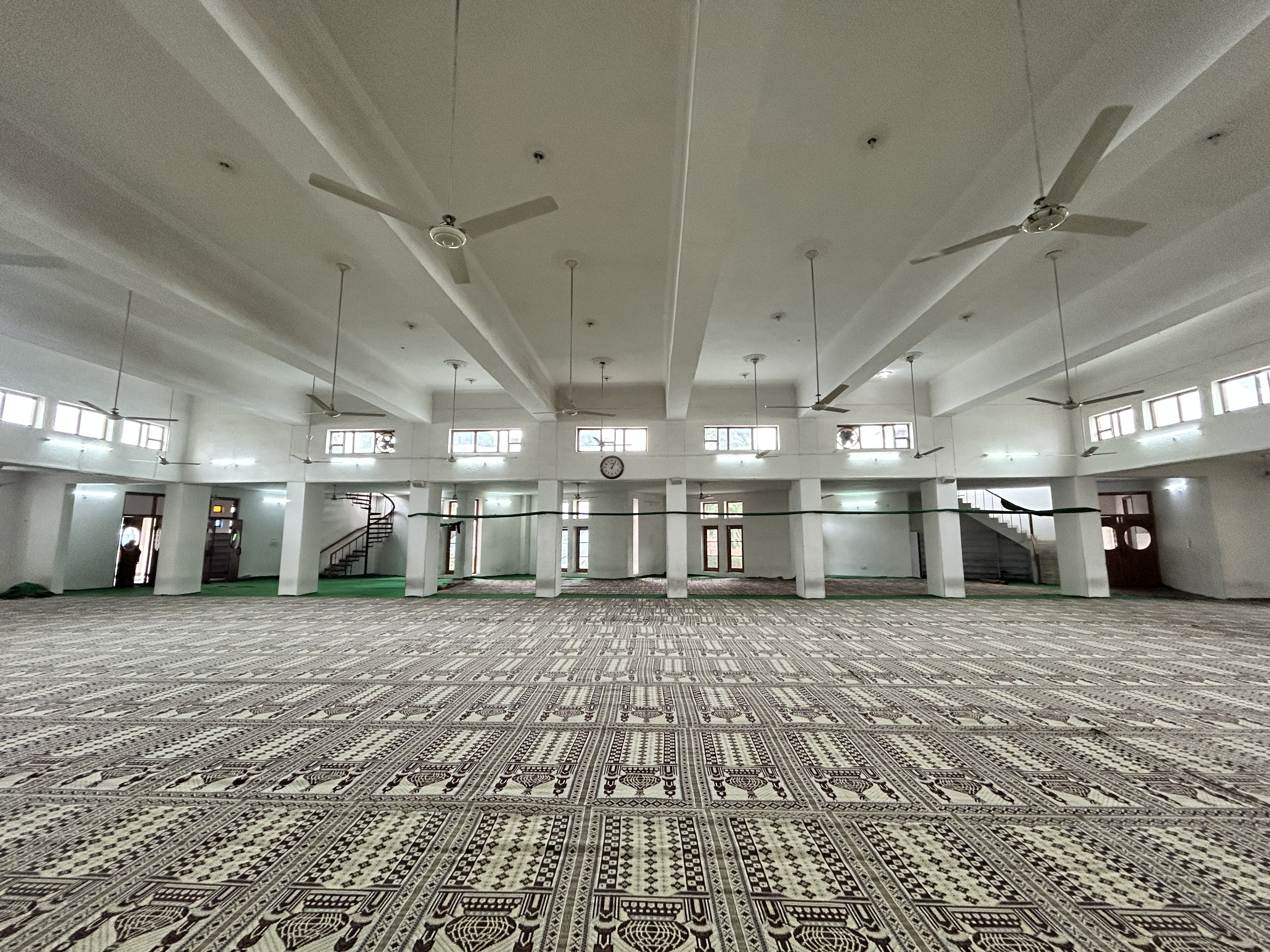
Interior of the mosque

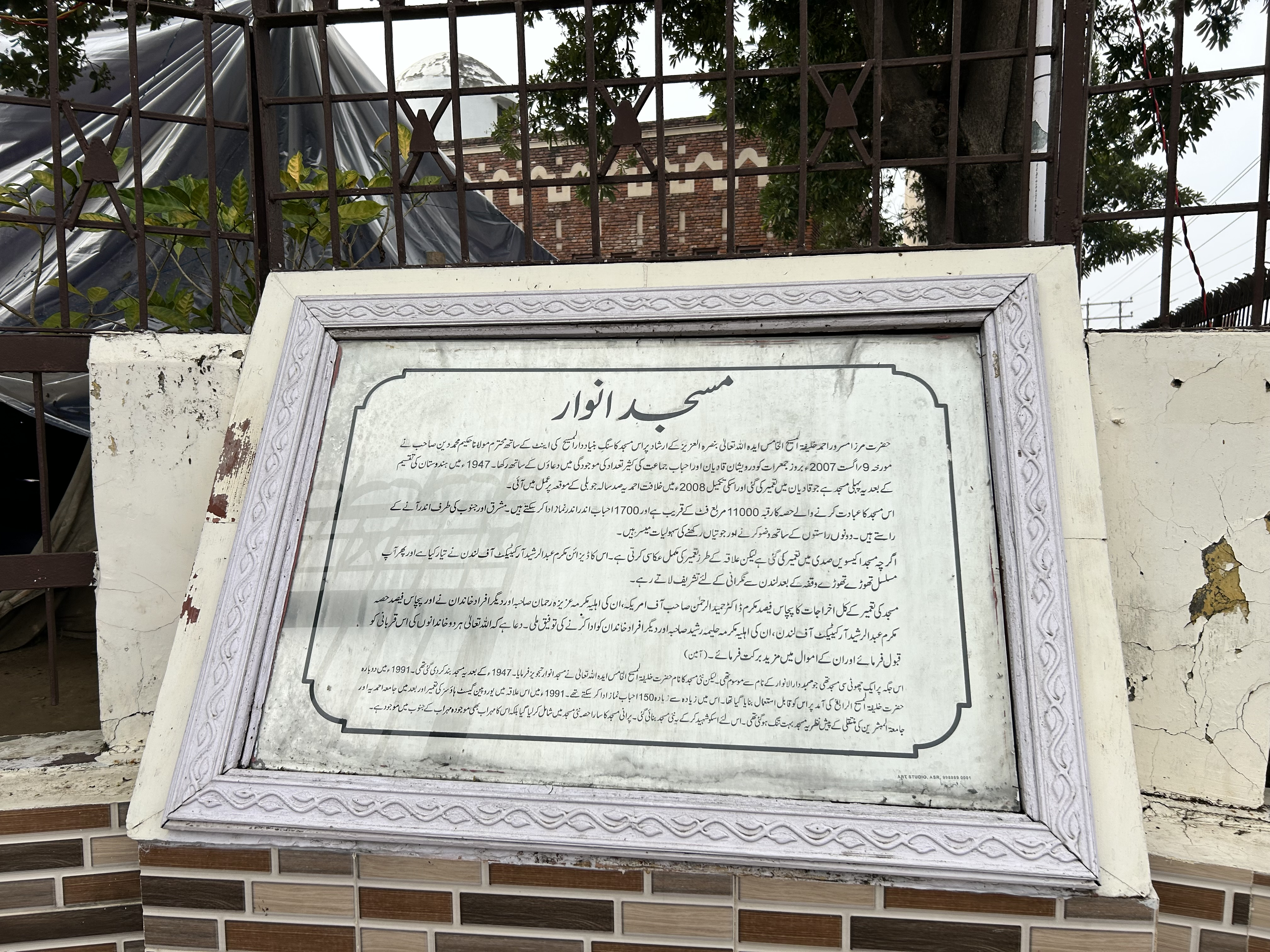
historical marker in Urdu

== See also ==
- Jamia Ahmadiyya
- Noor Mosque, Qadian
- Mubarak Mosque, Qadian
- Aqsa Mosque, Qadian
