= Noor Mosque, Qadian =

Mosque in Qadian, Punjab, India

Noor Mosque
- مسجد نور; Masjid Noor

Religion
- Affiliation: Islam
- Branch/tradition: Ahmadiyya

Location
- Location: Qadian, Punjab, India
- Interactive map of Noor Mosque
- Coordinates: 31°49′42″N 75°22′40″E

Architecture
- Type: mosque
- Style: Islamic
- Completed: 1910
- Construction cost: 5,000 Rs

Specifications
- Capacity: 2500
- Dome: 1
- Minaret: 4
- Site area: 1300 square feet

Noor Mosque (Urdu: مسجد نور, lit. 'Mosque of the spiritual light') is a mosque in the Darul Uloom neighbourhood of Qadian. It was built in 1910, during the reign of first Ahmadiyya caliph, Hakeem Noor-ud-Din. It lies adjacent to the Darus Salam Kothi and the former Taleem-ul-Islam college.

The mosque is considered the heart of the Darul Uloom neighborhood of Qadian, with the neighborhood being founded following the construction of the mosque. It was built in conjunction with a hostel and high school building to accommodate the increasing population of Qadian.

== History ==
The foundation stone of the mosque was laid on 5 March 1910 by the first caliph, after Fajr prayer, and two months later, on 22 April 1910, when one portion of the mosque was built, the mosque was inaugurated with Asr prayers. The construction of the mosque was completed with ₹5,000 (equivalent to ₹1.7 million or US$17,000 in 2023), through the donations of the members of the community. Following its inception, it was used as a hostel for a small time.

=== Jalsa Salana Qadian ===
Between 1912-1913, the courtyard of the mosque was constructed, which spans across 5700 square ft. For a period of 10 years, spanning from 1913-1923, the Jalsa Salana in Qadian was held at the mosque here.

=== Khilafat Election ===
Following the death of Hakeem Noor-ud-Din, as per his will of the selection of a successor, the election of the second caliph was held at this mosque on 14 March 1914, following which Mirza Basheer-ud-Din Mahmood Ahmad was elected as the second caliph in Ahmadiyya.

=== Partition of Indian subcontinent ===
Following the partition of India, the mosque remained closed when it was temporarily taken over by Hindus and Sikhs, with the exterior being used as a make-shift dhobi ghat and interior for public meetings. It continued to remain closed until 1990 when Friday prayers were resumed, along with the resumption of regular prayers in 2006.

== Architecture ==
The mosque has several features:

- 1 central dome with 2 small minarets
- 2 bigger minarets on the corner of the mosques

In February 2017, the entire mosque was renovated with new waterproof plastering and painting.

== See also ==
- Aqsa Mosque, Qadian
- Mubarak Mosque, Qadian
- White Minaret
- Anwaar Mosque
