= Kotla Moosa =

- Village
- Country: India
- State: Punjab
- District: Gurdaspur
- Tehsil: Batala
- Region: Majha

Government
  - Type: Panchayat raj
  - Body: Gram panchayat

Area
  - Total: 85 ha (210 acres)

Population (2011)
  - Total: 660; 340/320 ♂/♀
  - Scheduled Castes: 196; 98/98 ♂/♀
  - Total Households: 109

Languages
  - Official: Punjabi
- Time zone: UTC+5:30 (IST)
- Telephone: 01871
- ISO 3166 code: IN-PB
- Vehicle registration: PB-18
- Website: gurdaspur.nic.in

Kotla Moosa is a village in Batala in Gurdaspur district of Punjab State, India. It is located 16 kilometres (9.9 mi) from sub district headquarter, 32 kilometres (20 mi) from district headquarter and 3 kilometres (1.9 mi) from Qadian. The village is administrated by Sarpanch an elected representative of the village.

== Demography ==
As of 2011, the village has a total number of 109 houses and a population of 660 of which 340 are males while 320 are females. According to the report published by Census India in 2011, out of the total population of the village 196 people are from Schedule Caste and the village does not have any Schedule Tribe population so far.

== See also ==
- List of villages in India
