= Our Teachings =

1902 book by Mirza Ghulam Ahmad

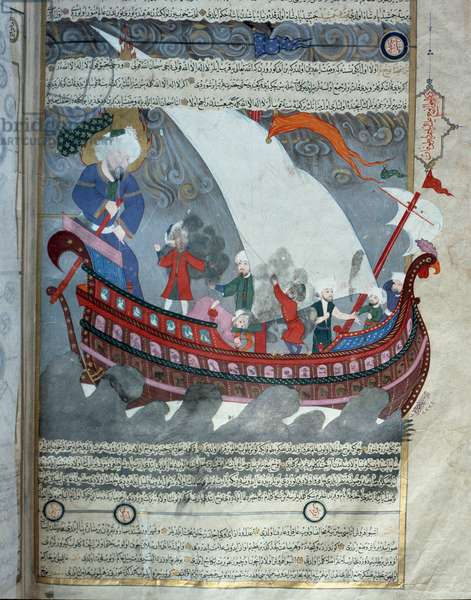
The Noah's Ark and the deluge

Our Teachings (Kashti-Nooh in Urdu) is an Urdu book published in 1902 by the founder of the Ahmadiyya movement, Mirza Ghulam Ahmad of Qadian, India. Mirza Ghulam Ahmad, a Messiah and Mahdi claimant, attempted to revive the purported original and pristine teachings of Islam. He entitled the book "Noah's Ark", implying that those who wanted to be saved from the deluge of irreligion and materialism should join the Ahmadiyya Muslim Community. Published in many languages, this English edition has been published by ‘Islam International Publications Limited’; Tilford, Surrey GUI0 2AQ. U.K. ISBN 1-85372-394-0] (1990)
