= Mohammad Omar Samim =

- Born: 1961 (age 63–64); Rowza, Guzara district, Herat Province, Afghanistan
- Occupation: legislator

Mohammad Omar Samim was selected to represent Herat Province in Afghanistan's Meshrano Jirga, the upper house of its National Legislature, in 2005. A report on Herat prepared at the Navy Postgraduate School stated he attended the Wazir Fatah Khan High School, and then, between 1979 and 1985 he earned a medical degree at Kabul University.

He worked for a Swedish organization between 1986 and 1991, where he established clinics in remote areas. He worked at hospitals in Herat between 1992 and 1998. From 1996 to 1998 he directed the Noor Hospital. He was Herat's director of public health from 2001 to 2004. He was from 1992 to 2005, concurrently, a faculty member at Kabul University's medical school and the founding editor of an Afghan health magazine.

He served on the emergency Loya Jirga that drafted Afghanistan's new constitution.

He was chosen to represent Herat indirectly, by the Herat Provincial Council, without being affiliated with any political party.
