= Mirza Hadi Beg =

Indian nobleman and judge

- Mīrzā (prince/royal); Beg (chief); Qādhī (judge)

Landed nobility
- Successor: Muhammad Sultan
- Noble family: Barlas
- Issue: Muhammad Sultan; Muhammad Ghaus; Muhammad Din

Mirza Hadi Beg (Persian: میرزا هادی بیگ; fl. 1530 CE) was an Indian nobleman and Qadi (Islamic judge) of Central Asian origin, and a direct ancestor of Mirza Ghulam Ahmad, the founder of the Ahmadiyya movement. He migrated from Samarqand, in what is today Uzbekistan, to northern India and settled in the Punjab during the 16th century. Hadi Beg was a collateral kin of Babur, the founding emperor of the Mughal dynasty in the Indian subcontinent, but was not a Timurid.

== Biography ==
=== Background ===
Mirza Hadi Beg was a Barlas nobleman and scholar and a direct descendant of Hajji Beg Barlas, a paternal relative of Timur, the 14th century ruler of Persia and Central Asia. The Barlas were originally a prominent Turco-Mongol tribe who controlled territories in the Transoxianian region of Kish (modern Shahrisabz, some 80 km south of Samarqand). Following Timur's rise to power within the tribe and amidst his conflict with Hajji Beg as leader of the Barlas, the family fled, with other members of the tribe, to Khorasan, where they remained until the 16th century. In the early part of this century, Mirza Hadi Beg returned to the homeland of his ancestors and settled in Samarqand, but left the city in 1530, perhaps due to domestic dissensions or an affliction, and moved along with his family and a retinue of two hundred persons consisting of servants and followers to northern India, where the emperor Babur had recently established the Mughal dynasty.

=== In India ===
During the final year of Babur's reign, Mirza Hadi Beg and his family settled in the Punjab where Hadi Beg established a walled and fortified village near the River Beas and named it Islampur. He was granted a large tract of land comprising several hundred villages that together resembled a semi-independent territory by the imperial court of Babur and was also appointed the Qadhi (magistrate) of the surrounding district thereby giving him legal jurisdiction (Qadiyat) over the area. As the village was associated with the seat of the Qadhi, it came to be known as Islampur-Qazi. This name evolved into various forms based on cognates and the local dialect, until Islampur was dropped altogether, and it came to be known simply as Qadian, the name by which it is still known today.

== Descendants ==
Mirza Hadi Beg’s descendants were known as the Begzada family and held Qadian for over 300 years maintaining close relations with the Mughal rulers and holding important offices within the imperial government. At its height, the family commanded a force of 7,000 soldiers under the Mughal emperor and, following the decline of Mughal power, were able to obtain de facto regional autonomy, becoming, in effect, the quasi-independent rulers of some sixty square miles. Most of this estate was lost however, first to the Sikhs in the 18th century and then to the British in the 19th. Perhaps the best known descendant of Hadi Beg was Mirza Ghulam Ahmad who founded the Ahmadiyya movement within Islam.

== See also ==
- Mirza Ghulam Murtaza
- Mirza Faiz Muhammad
- Mirza Gul Muhammad
