= Mirza Gul Muhammad =

- Predecessor: Mirza Faiz Muhammad
- Successor: Mirza Ata Muhammad
- Born: Qadian, India
- Died: Qadian, India
- House: Barlas
- Religion: Islam

Mirza Gul Muhammad
- Died: 1800
- Military career
- Allegiance: Mughal Empire
- Branch: Mughal Army
- Rank: General

Mirza Gul Muhammad (died 1800) was an Indian military official in the Mughal Empire and the independent chief of Qadian. He was the grandfather of Mirza Ghulam Murtaza who was the father of Mirza Ghulam Ahmad.

== Life and Reign ==
Gul Muhammad succeeded as the Qazi of Qadian upon the death of his father Faiz Muhammad and was the independent chief of Qadian and its surrounding country, ruling over 85 villages. He commanded an army of 1,000 consisting of infantry and cavalry. During his reign, the Mughal Empire had declined in Punjab. Throughout his life, he fought against the insurgent Sikhs and solicited the support of four successive Mughal Emperors. Although they supported him verbally they offered no practical assistance which resulted in the formation of the Sikh Empire and ended Mughal control within the Punjab region. Ghiyas-ul-Daula, who was a minister of the Mughal Empire had come to Qadian and was impressed to see that the state was being run according to Islamic principles.
