= Talim-ul-Islam College =

Government college in Chenab Nagar, Pakistan

Govt Talim-ul-Islam College
- Motto: Ilm-O-Amal (Urdu)
- Type: Government
- Established: 1898
- Affiliations: BISE Faisalabad and Uni of the Punjab Lhr
- Principal: Mahar Sarfraz waince
- Location: Chenab Nagar (Chiniot), Punjab, Pakistan; 31.752529°N 72.920111°E
- Website: ticollegerabwah.com

Talim-ul-Islam College (also referred to as T.I. College) is a government college located in Rabwah, Pakistan. Founded in 1898 in Qadian, India by the Ahmadiyya Community.

Originally starting out as a middle school, the institution traces its roots to two rooms in a guest house located in Qadian. It was established to provide an Ahmadiyya-based curriculum in a town that had a small number of schools where most teachers taught with a bias against Islam.

Inaugurated on 1 January 1898 as Madrassa Talim-ul-Islam, the school quickly became a high school within a three-year period. With a call from the community's founder, several of Mirza Ghulam Ahmad's followers sacrificed positions in established institutions to dedicate their teaching skills to the recently established facility. This attracted students from various backgrounds including both Muslims and Hindus from all over India who were not charged any tuition.

In 1903, the school transitioned to a college, renamed to Talim-ul-Islam College. It operated as such for only two years when it was forced closed due new regulatory criteria requiring that each college have adequate financial resources, qualified permanent faculty, and established facilities. This resulted in the school's closure until 1944 when the community was able to meet the requirements.

The completion of the school year in 1947 proved to be the last year Talim-ul-Islam College remained open Qadian. In 1947, Pakistan and India gained independence. As a result, the majority of faculty and students made the migration to Pakistan, resulting in the permanent closure of the facility in Qadian.

After a short time in Lahore, Talim-ul-Islam College permanently established its location in Rabwah, Pakistan.

== History ==
Mirza Gulam Ahmad laid the foundation for the college by starting Talim-ul-Islam Middle School in 1898, which was upgraded to the high school level in 1901. The college was opened in 1903, but had to be closed down because it did not meet the requirements of the Punjab University.

In 1944, Mirza Basheer-ud-Din Mahmood Ahmad laid the foundation of the college. Mirza Nasir Ahmad was appointed principal, and the college was housed in the spacious building of the Talim-ul-Islam High School, for which a new building was erected. Khalifatul Masih II steered the college through its most critical phases in 1947, when the college became homeless as a result of the independence of Pakistan in 1947. After operating in an abandoned horse stable for several months, the college shifted to the abandoned building of the D.A.V. College in Lahore. This building was used as a refugee camp for some time, and became badly damaged but was repaired to suit the needs of the college. In 1955, the college moved to its current campus at Rabwah.
