= Abdul Wahab Adam =

Ghanaian Islamic scholar (1938–2014)

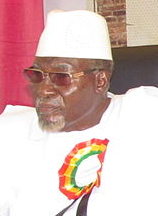
- Born: 8 December 1938; Brofeyedur - Adansi
- Died: 22 June 2014 (aged 75)

Abdul Wahab Adam (8 December 1938 – 22 June 2014) was an Islamic scholar, ameer (head) and missionary-in-charge of the Ahmadiyya Muslim Community of Ghana. He was a member of Ghana's National Peace Council and the National Reconciliation Commission that was set up in 2002.

== Personal life ==
Adam was born in December 1938 at Brofeyedur Adansi in the Ashanti Region of Ghana. He completed his secondary education at T.I. Ahmadiyya Secondary School in Kumasi and proceeded to the Ahmadiyya Muslim Seminary and Ahmadiyya Theological University in Pakistan, where he received a Diploma in Arabic and an honours degree in theology and Islamic jurisprudence in 1960. After serving as the Brong-Ahafo Regional Missionary of Ahmadiyya Muslim Mission from 1960 to 1969, he became the principal of the Ahmadiyya Muslim Missionary Training College at Saltpond in Ghana. In 1971, he was appointed deputy head of the Ahmadiyya Muslim Mission in the United Kingdom. He was subsequently promoted to the position of ameer (head) and missionary-in-charge of the Ahmadiyya Muslim Mission in Ghana. He steered the affairs of the mission with distinction from 1975.

He died on 22 June 2014. Three days later, a state funeral was held. The funeral was attended by the vice president, ministers of state, members of parliament and various Christian and Muslim leaders.

== Work ==
Adam was a member of various governmental and non-governmental organizations which aim to promote values of democracy, peace and human rights. He was a member of Centre for Democracy and Development, the National Peace Council of Ghana and the National Reconciliation Commission. He was also the vice-chairman of the Ghana Integrity Initiative and the co-founder and national president of the Council of Religions of Ghana.

In his capacity as a member of the Ahmadiyya Muslim Mission, Adam worked as the co-editor of Muslim Herald in London and the editor of Ahmadiyya Bulletin, London. He was a member World Council of Ahmadi Muslim Jurists. In his relationship with Muslim bodies in Ghana, he is credited with the establishment of the Hilal Committee and the granting of national holidays to mark the Eid al-Fitr and Eid-al-Adha festivals on the Islamic calendar.
