= Qadian railway station =

Railway station in Qadian, India

Qadian

General information
- Location: India
- Coordinates: 31°49′35″N 75°23′17″E
- System: Indian Railways Station
- Owner: Indian Railways
- Operator: Northern Railways
- Line: Batala–Qadian
- Platforms: 1
- Tracks: 1

Other information
- Status: Functioning
- Station code: QDN
- Zone(s): Northern Railway zone
- Division(s): Firozpur

History
- Electrified: 2021

Services
Preceding station	Indian Railways	Following station
Batala towards ?	Northern Railway zone Amritsar–Qadian line	Terminus
Location

Qadian railway station is the station serving the city of Qadian, located in the Gurdaspur district. It is served by the Batala–Qadian branch line, with a proposed Qadian–Beas Line which was sanctioned back in 2011.

== History ==
=== Construction ===
In early 1927, the railway board had approved the Qadian–Butari line, a 42-mile long and 5ft 6" wide track. It would run from Batala–Butari, hence it was called the Batala-Butari project. The railway line had reached Qadian on 14 November 1928. Initially, the plan was to continue building the line to Butari, but it was decided by the railway board to postpone the continuation of the line, and constructed parts of the line were removed.

== Electrification ==
In March 2021, the first electric train had been commissioned on the Batala–Qadian line in a trial after the completion of a several-month long project.
