= Jamia Ahmadiyya =

Ahmadiyya University
- جامعة الأحمدية
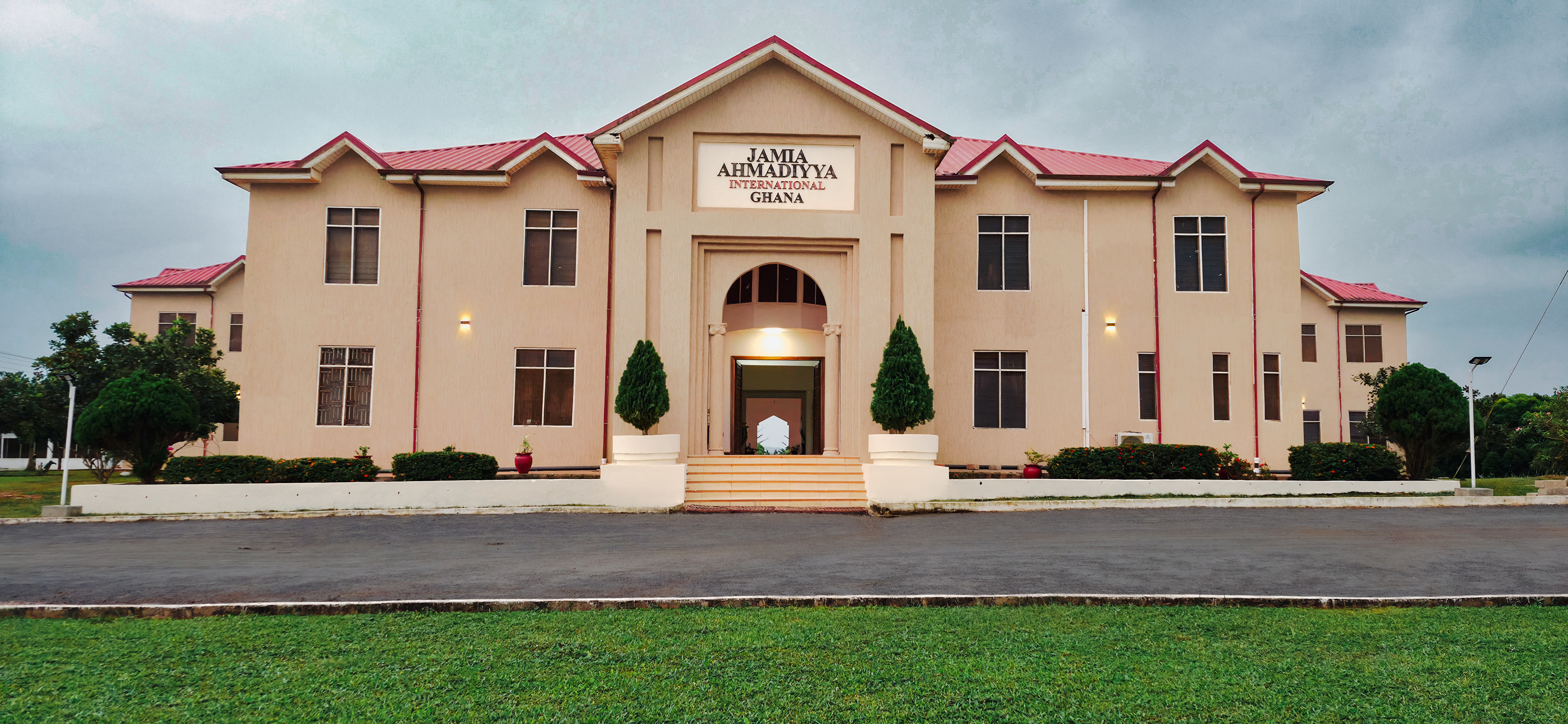
- Jamia Ahmadiyya International in 2026

Information
- Type: Islamic Theology
- Religious affiliation: Ahmadiyya Islam
- Established: 1906
- Campuses: Universities offer extended Shahid degree: Pakistan; United Kingdom; India; Ghana; Canada; Germany; Bangladesh; Indonesia; Malaysia; Campuses offer short degree programs: Nigeria; Tanzania; Sri Lanka; Sierra Leone; Kenya; Madagascar
- Colours: Black and White

Jāmi’ah al-Ahmadīyyah (Arabic: جامعة الأحمدية; Jāmi’ah al-Ahmadīyyah, "the Ahmadiyya University") is an International Islamic seminary and educational institute with campuses in Pakistan, United Kingdom, India, Ghana, Canada, Germany, Indonesia, Bangladesh, Malaysia, In addition, there are affiliated Mu'alimeen centers (Missionary Training Centres) in Pakistan, Nigeria, Kenya, Sierra Leone Madagascar and some other countries. This historical institute was founded in 1906 as a Section in Madrassa Talim ul Islam (later Talim-ul-Islam College) by Mirza Ghulam Ahmad, the founder of the Ahmadiyya Muslim Community, it is the main centre of the Ahmadiyya Muslim Community for Islamic learning.

== History ==
The foundations of Jamia Ahmadiyya were laid by Mirza Ghulam Ahmad, founder of the Ahmadiyya Muslim Community himself, when he expressed the need for a madrassa for Ahmadi Muslims so that a new generation of Ahmadi scholars could be trained. This led to the creation of Talim-ul-Islam College in Qadian, India, in 1898. The theology section was later separated and inaugurated as Jamia Ahmadiyya Qadian on 20 May 1928 by Mirza Bashir-ud-Din Mahmood Ahmad, Khalifatul Masih II of the Ahmadiyya Muslim Community. Following the Partition of the Indian subcontinent, the Community relocated its headquarters to Rabwah, Pakistan. Keeping in view the needs of the Community in Pakistan, Jamia Ahmadiyya Rabwah was established. Since then, due to the exponential growth of the Community around the globe, campuses have been opened in many countries throughout the world.

== Degree and curriculum ==
There are two types of degrees offered:

- Shahid degree: This is a seven-year extensive course which is only available at some campuses (e.g. in the United Kingdom, Germany, Canada, Pakistan, India, Bangladesh & Jamia Ahmadiyya International Ghana) where this is the only course offered.
- Mu'alim degree: This is a three- to four-year short course offered in many different branches of Missionary training colleges.

The curriculum for the Jamia Ahmadiyyas around the globe is organised and compiled by scholars of the Ahmadiyya Muslim Community. The only differences are in the regional languages taught which are according to the locations of the institutions. The curriculum generally consists of:

- Fiqh (Islamic jurisprudence)
- Study of the Quran
- Modern Standard Arabic
- Comparative study of religions
- Urdu
- International languages
- Local national languages (based on the location of the school)
- Tasawwuf
- Ilm al-Hadith (Science of the Sayings of Muhammad)
- Tafsir (Exegesis of the Qur'an)
- History of science
- History of Islam
- Kalam (logic and argumentation)

== International campuses ==
=== Jamia Ahmadiyya Qadian, India ===
Jamia Ahmadiyya Qadian formerly known as Madrassa Ahmadiyya was established in the year 1905. This was the first Jamia Ahmadiyya established by the Ahmadiyya Muslim Community and was founded by the founder of Ahmadiyya Muslim community Mirza Ghulam Ahmad. It is still functional and producing missionaries who serve mostly in India, and Middle East.

=== Jamia Ahmadiyya Rabwah, Pakistan ===
After the migration from India to Pakistan, a new headquarters were established in Rabwah, Pakistan. A new Jamia Ahmadiyya was established to fulfill the needs of the Community.

=== Jamia Ahmadiyya United Kingdom ===
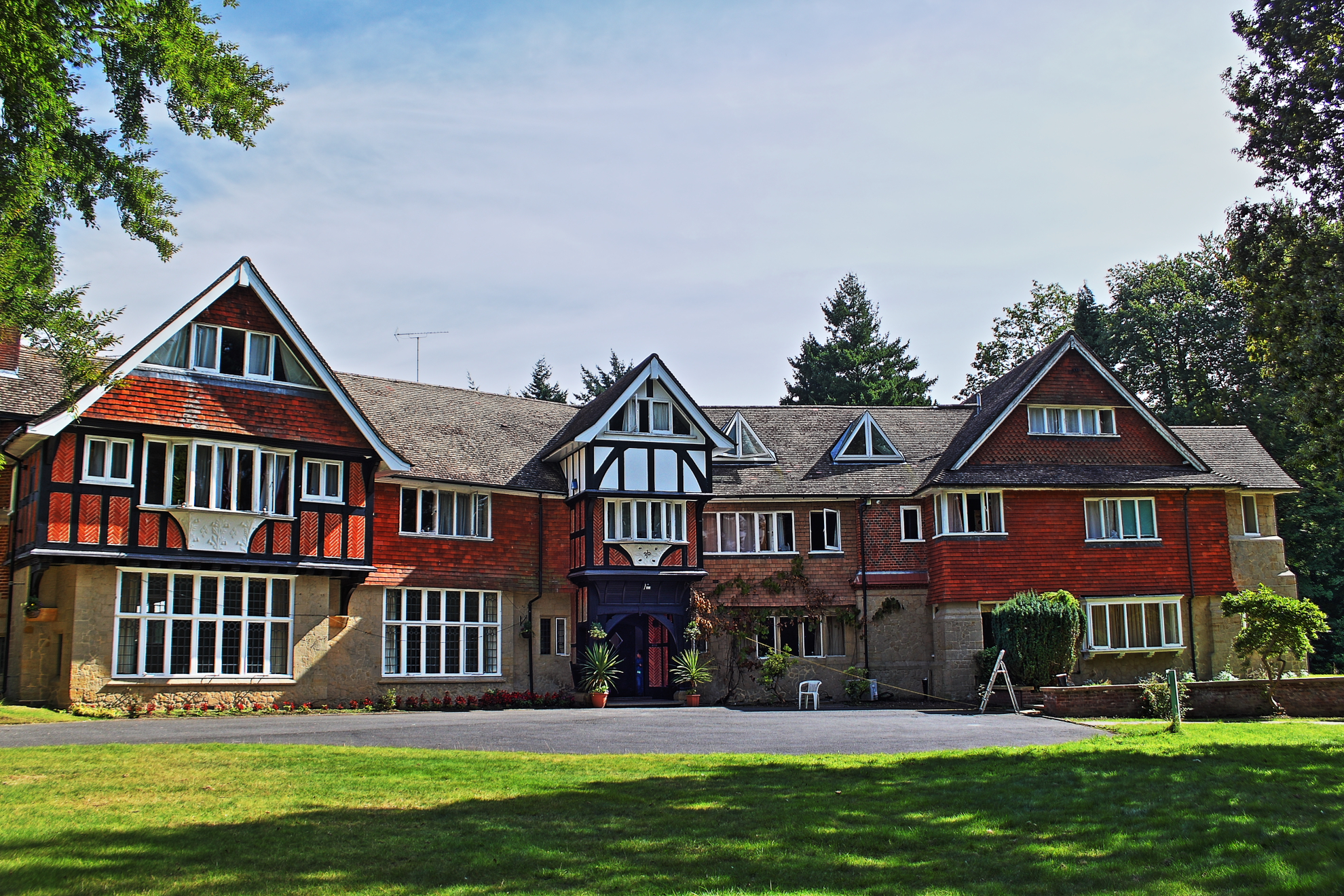
Jamia Ahmadiyya UK – Side Entrance

Jamia Ahmadiyya UK was established in 2005. On 21 October 2012, the World Head of the Ahmadiyya Muslim Jamaat, Mirza Masroor Ahmad, inaugurated the new Jamia Ahmadiyya UK College in Hindhead in Surrey.

=== Jamia Ahmadiyya Bangladesh ===
Jamia Ahmadiyya Bangladesh was established in 2006. It is situated in Dhaka, the capital city of Bangladesh.

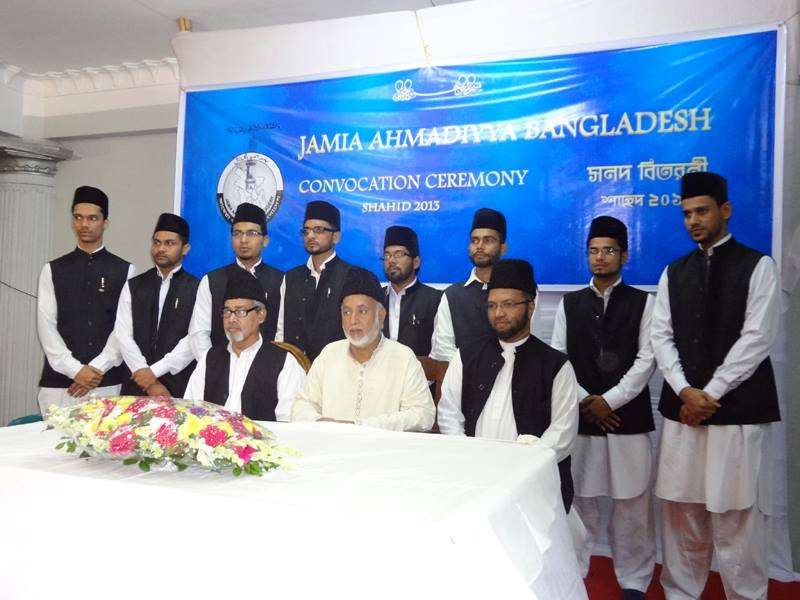
1st Convocation of Jamia Ahmadiyya Bangladesh, 2013

=== Jamia Ahmadiyya International Ghana ===
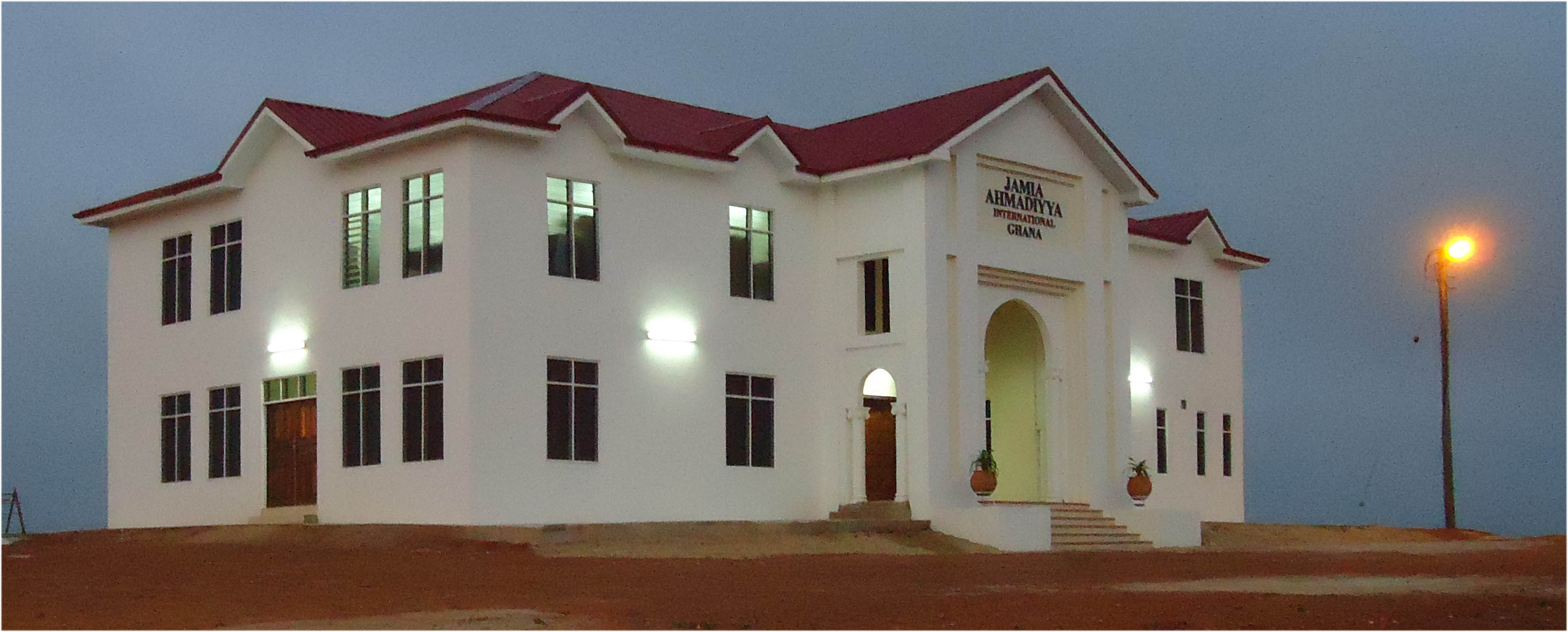
International Ahmadiyya University of Theology, Ghana

The new International Ahmadiyya University of Theology and Scholastic Sciences (Jamia Ahmadiyya International) was opened in Mankessim, Ghana. This region holds a deeply significant place in the history of Ahmadiyyat; it was in neighboring Saltpond where the first Ahmadi missionary, Maulvi Abdul Rahim Nayyar, arrived in 1921 to introduce the message of Ahmadiyyat to Africa.

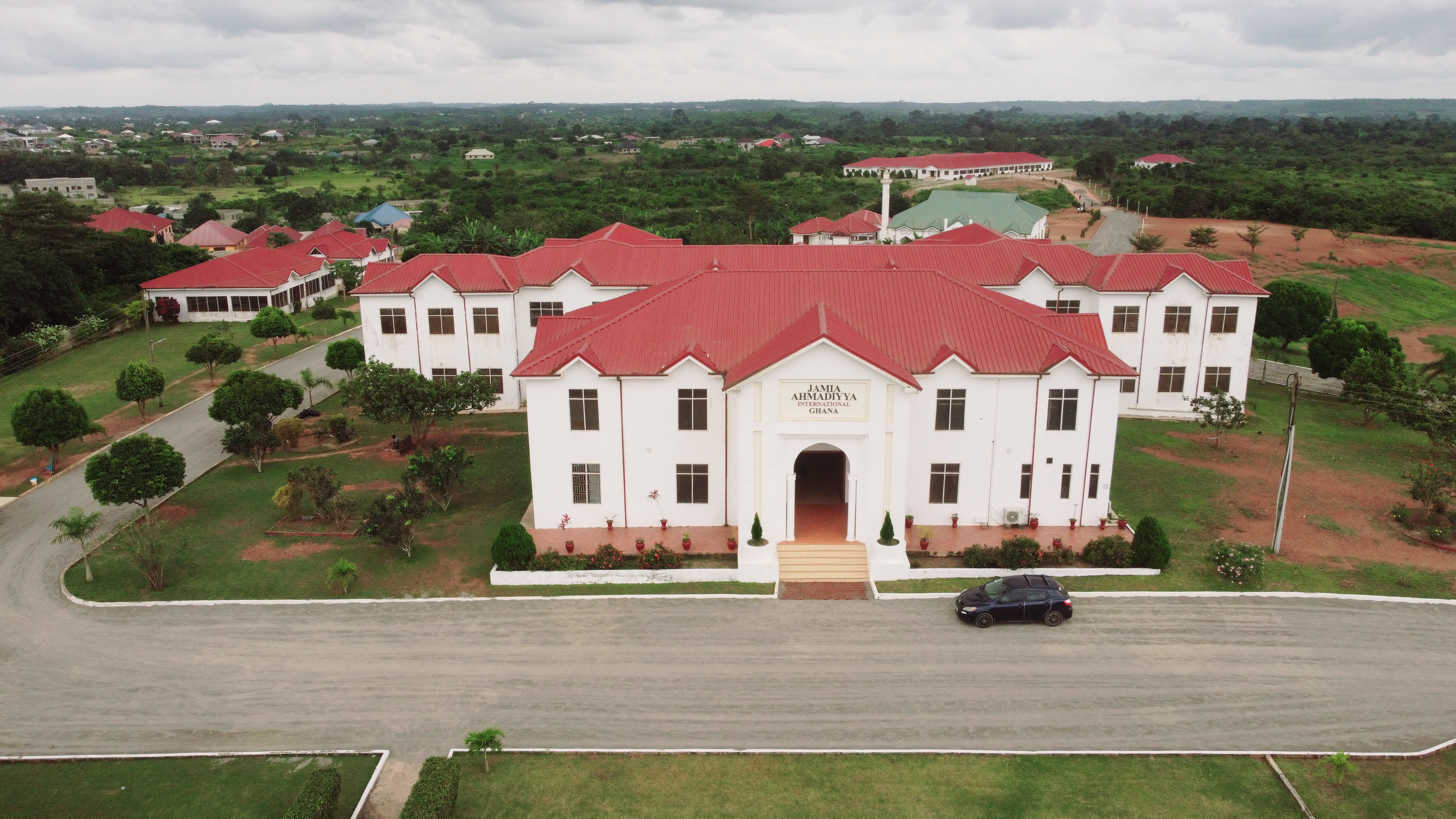
Aerial View of Jamia Ahmadiyya International Ghana

This campus was inaugurated on 26 August 2012 by Maulvi Abdul Wahab Adam (then Ameer and Missionary-in-Charge of the Ahmadiyya Muslim Mission Ghana), this institution hosts students from around the world for a rigorous, seven-year Shahid course. The campus has grown significantly since its inception; in its inaugural year, only 18 students were selected from eight countries. Today, the student body has expanded to 265 students representing 36 countries.

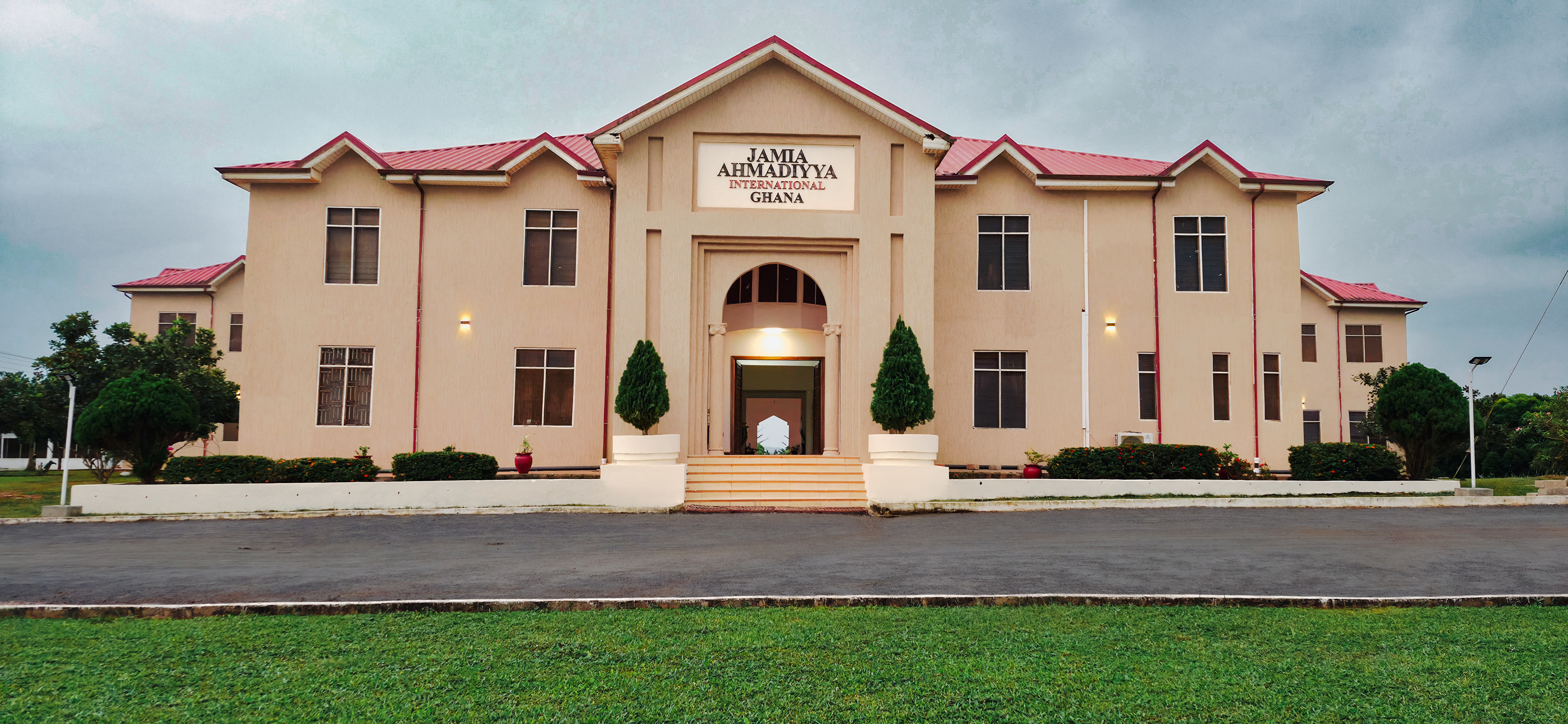
Jamia Ahmadiyya International in 2026

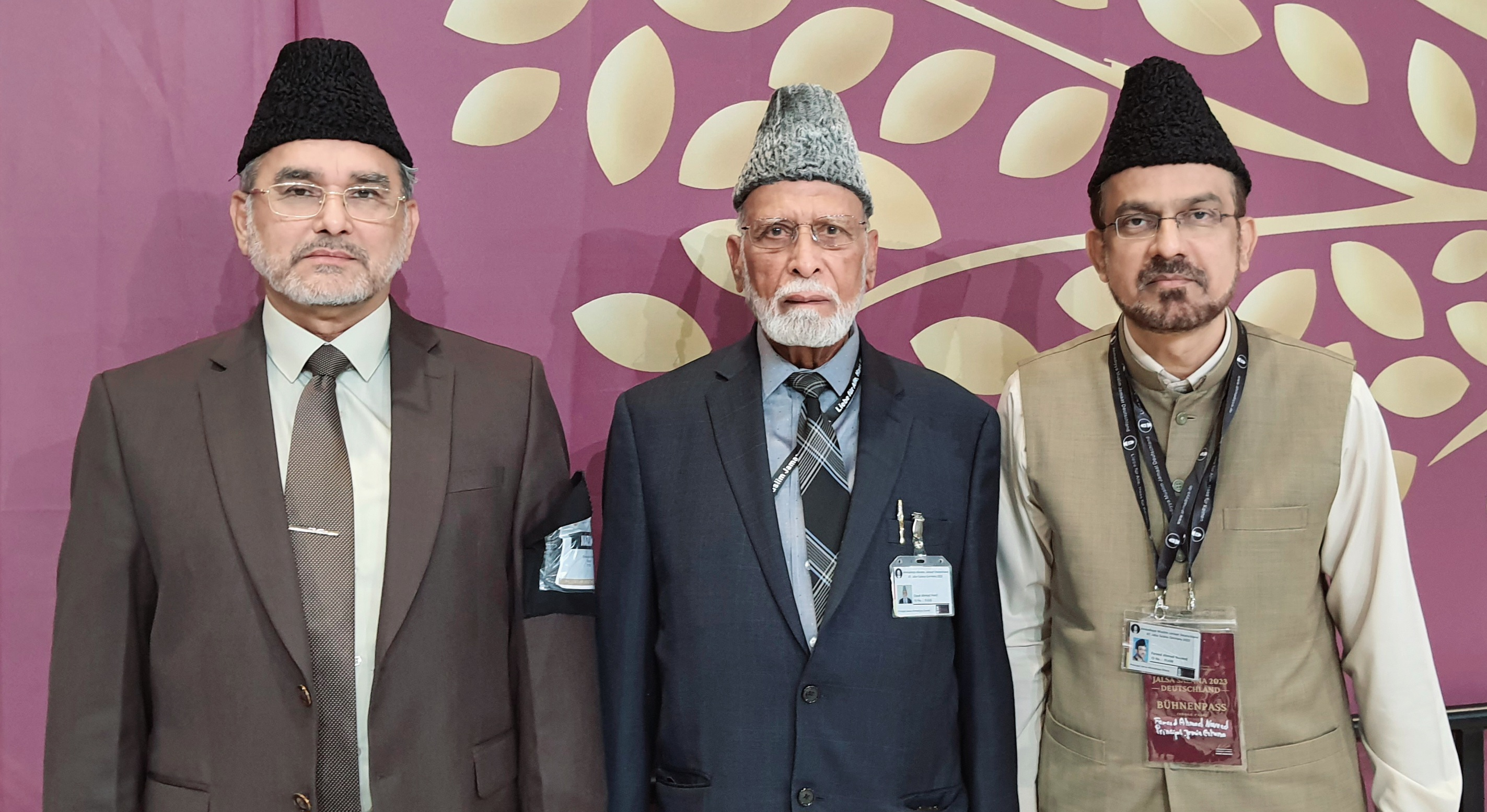
Mr Shamshad A Qamar (Principal Jamia Germany) Mr Daud Ahmad Hanif (Principal Jamia Canada) & Mr Fareed Ahmad Naveed (Principal Jamia International) at Ahmadiyya Convention 2023 Stuttgart, Germany.

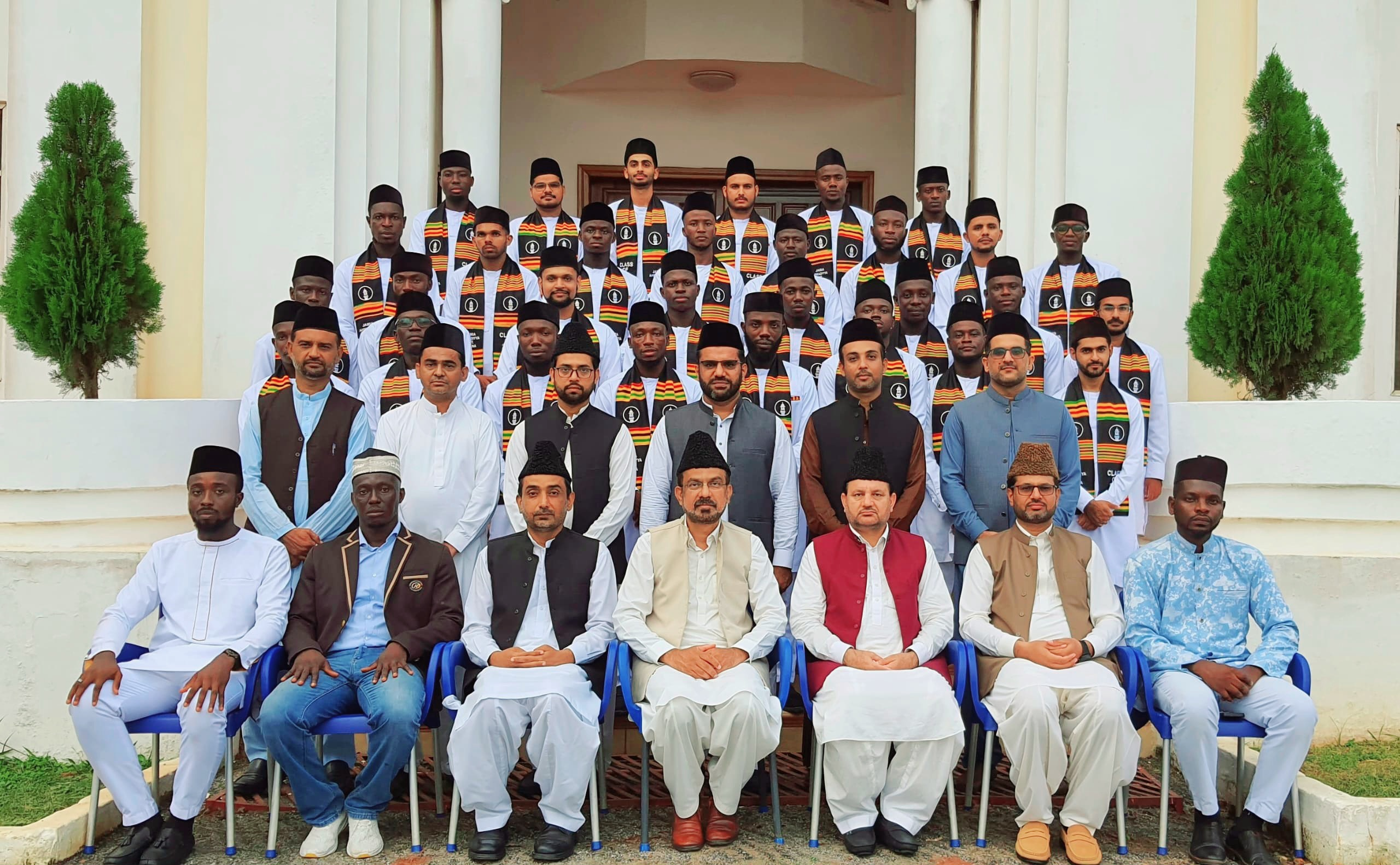
Graduating Class of 2024 with Staff and Lecturers

The first group of 26 missionaries graduated from the school on 1 July 2017.

Jamiatul Mubashireen Ghana in pictures

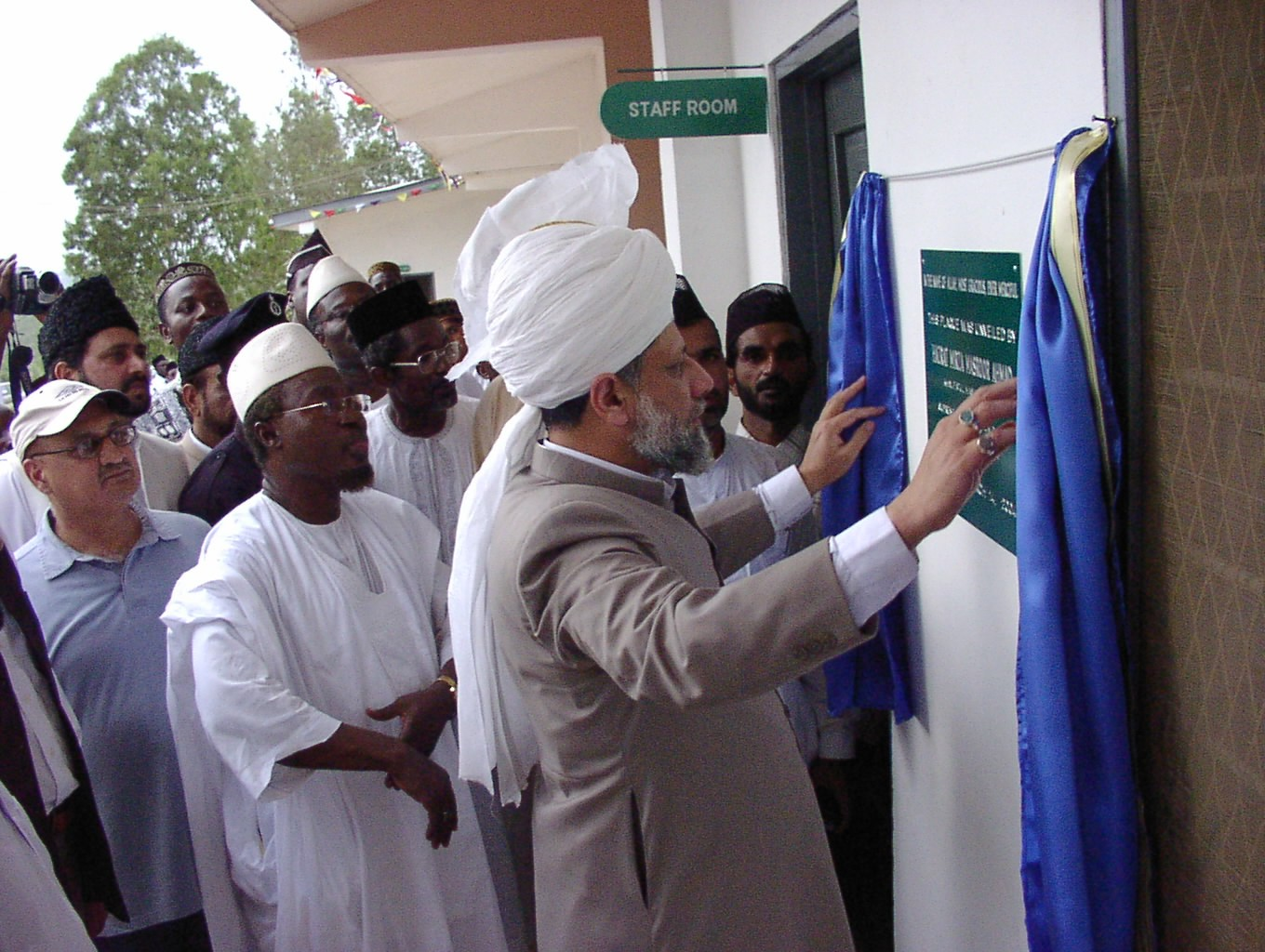
Khalifatul Massih V inaugurating the new building during his visit in 2004

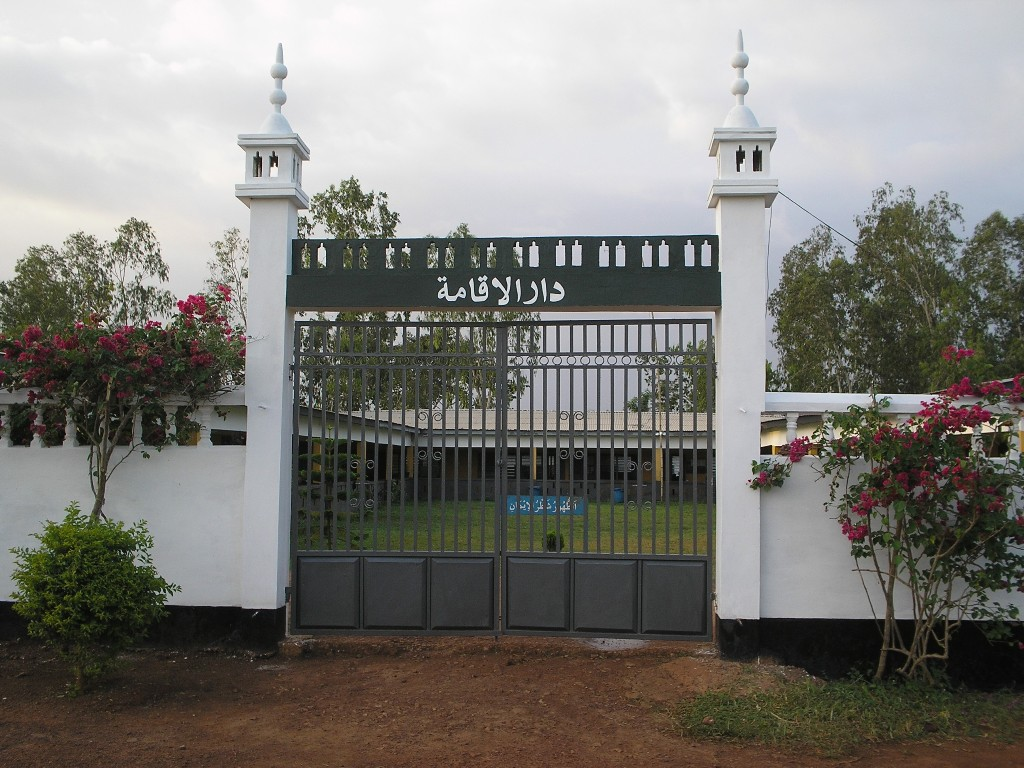
The Jamia Hostel

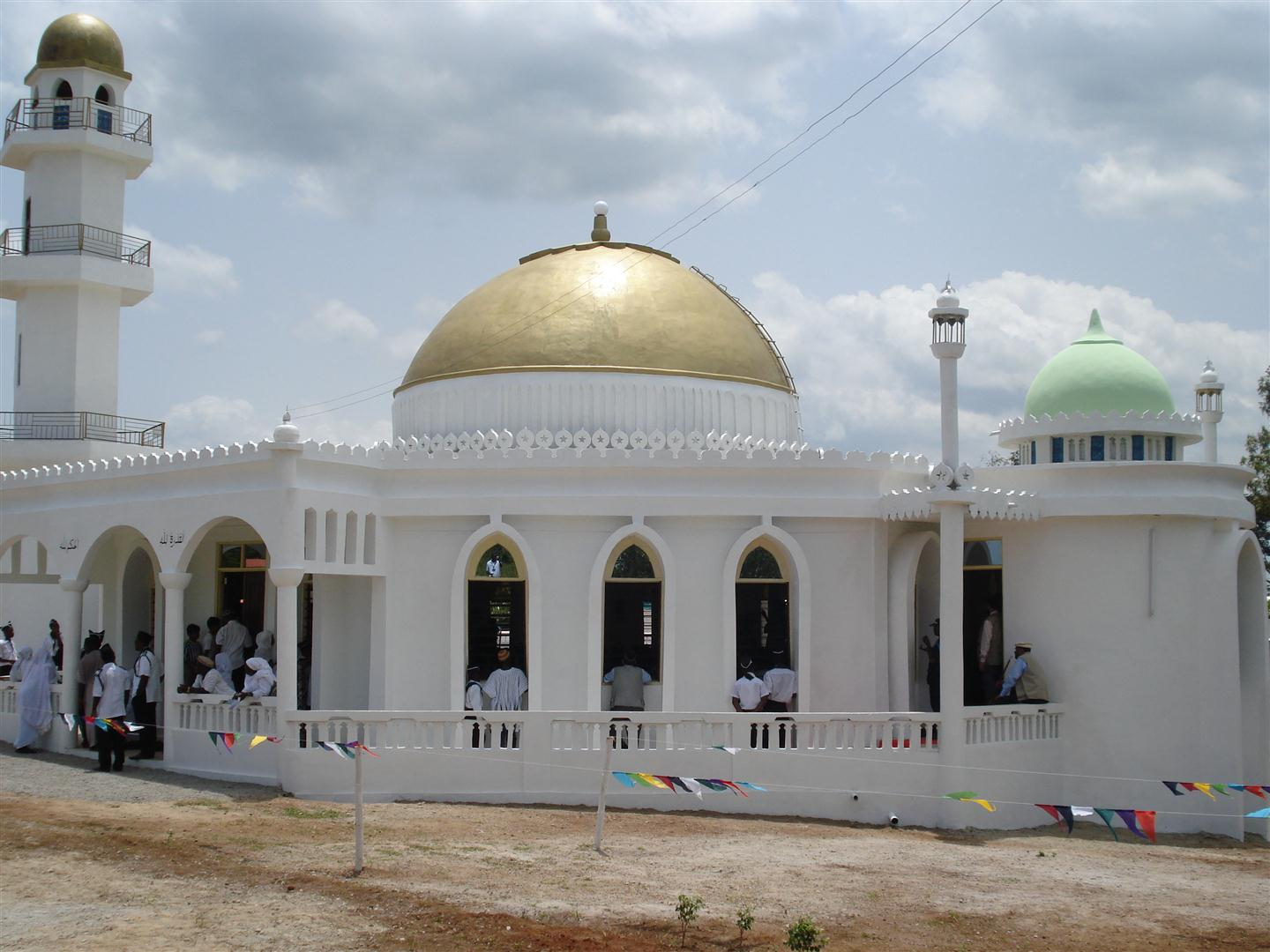
The Jamia Mosque – Masjid Noor

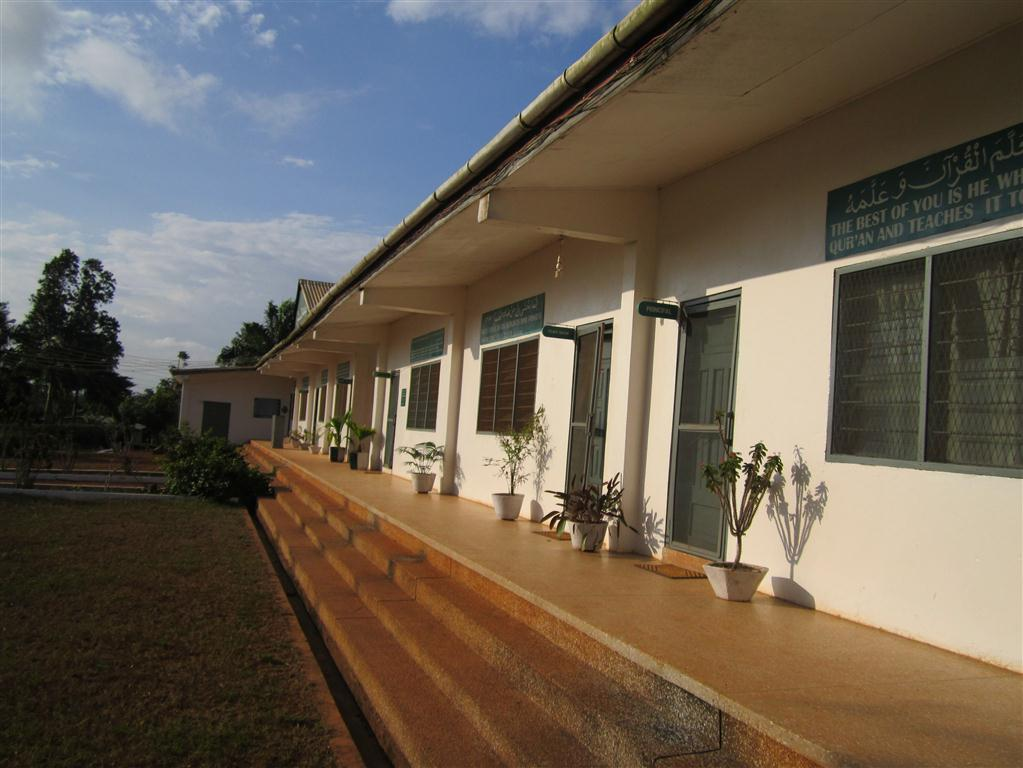
A side view of the Jamia building

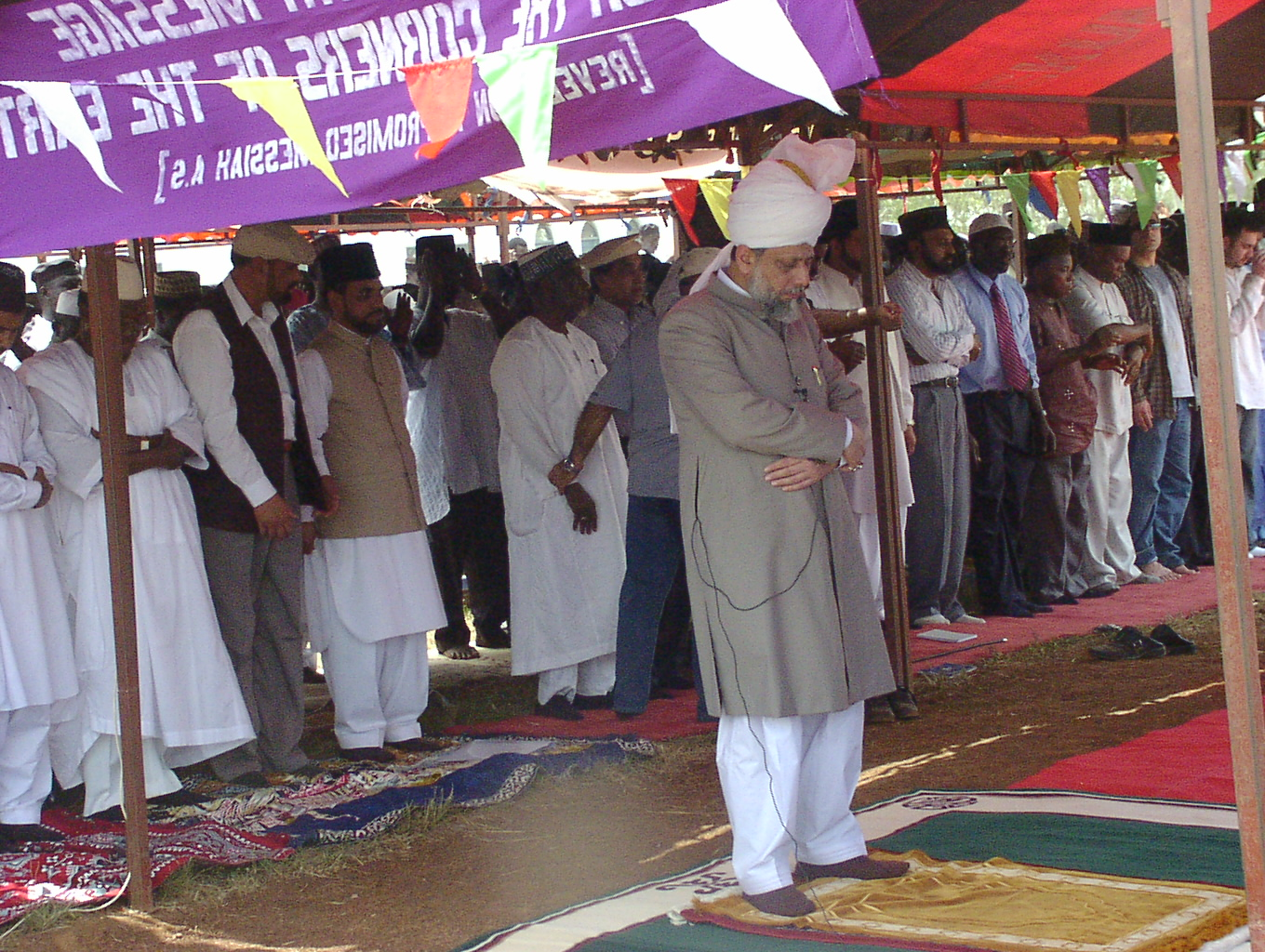
Khalifatul Massih V leading prayers on the pitch of the Jamia during his visit in 2004

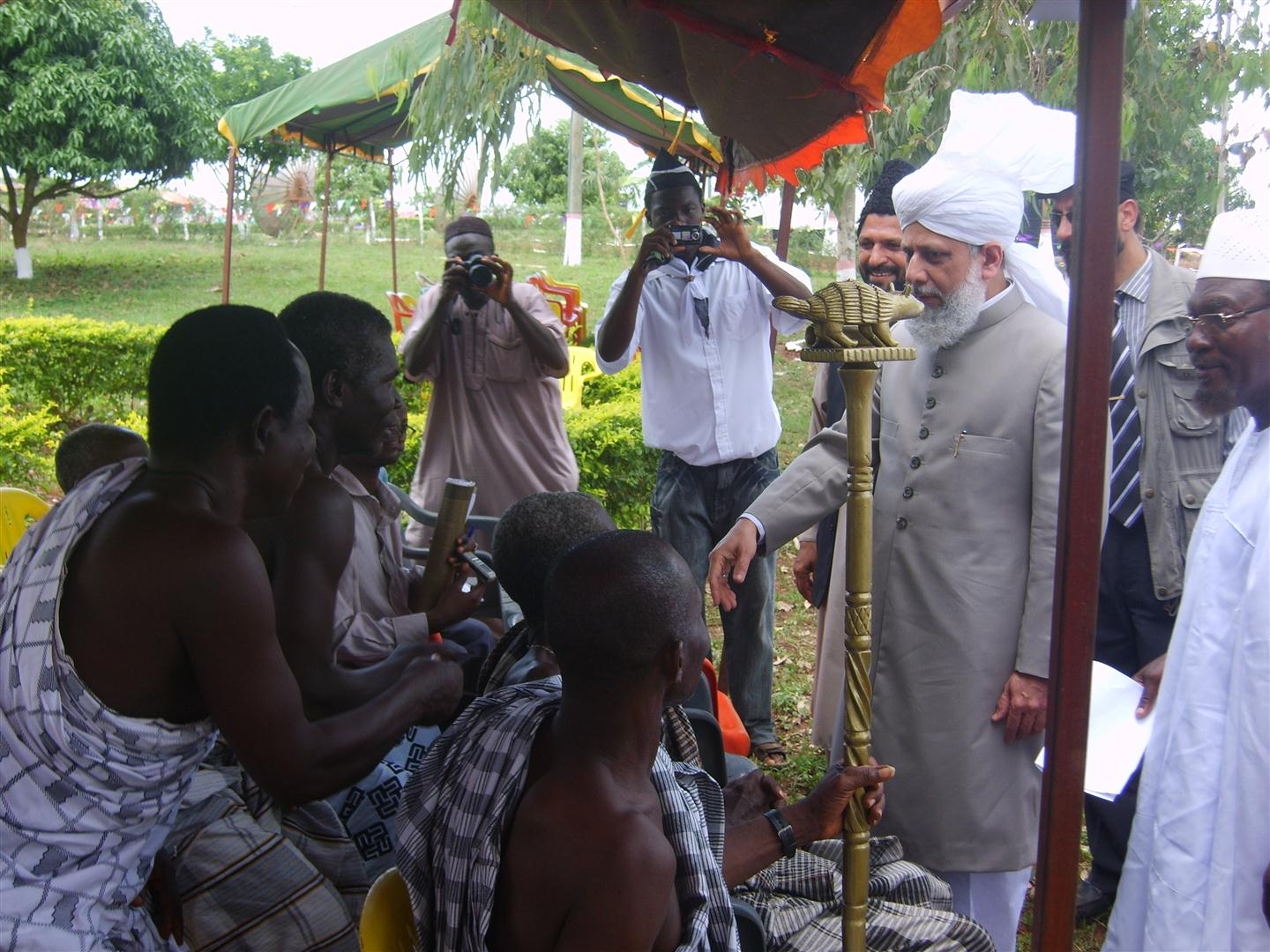
Khalifatul Massih V greeting the chiefs of the surrounding villages of the Jamia

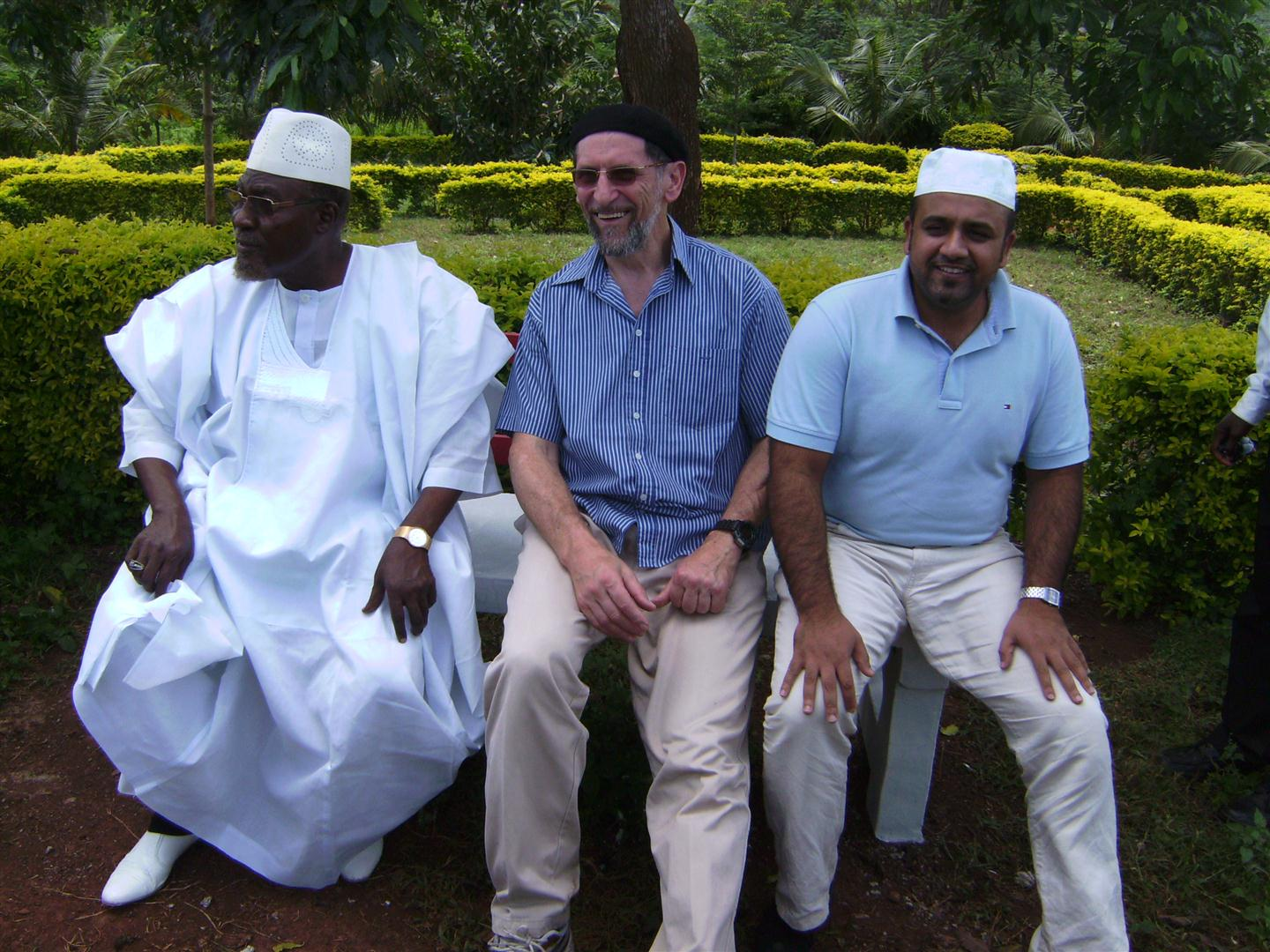
Ameer Sahib Germany's visit to Jamiatul Mubashireen

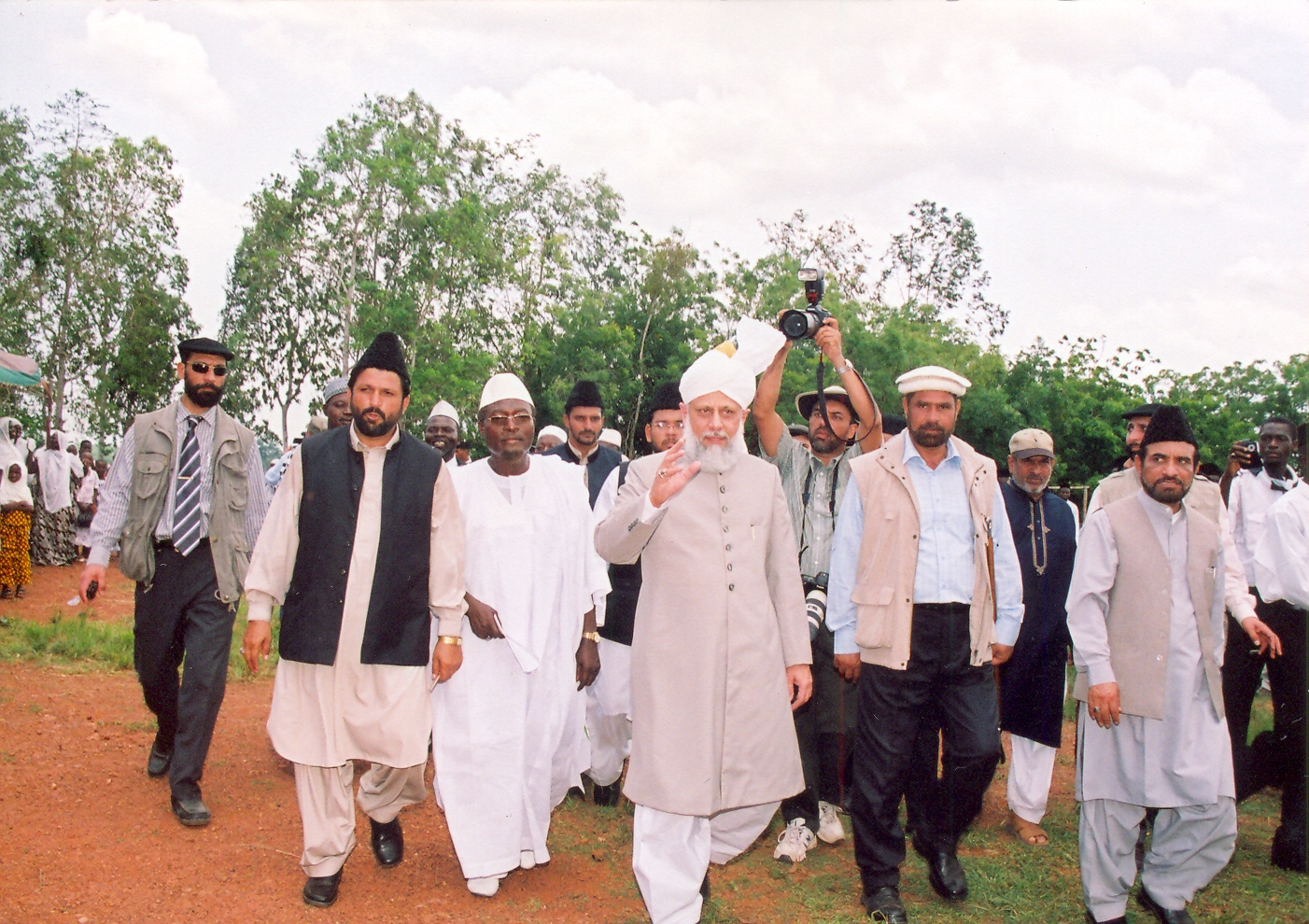
Khalifatul Massih V's visit to Jamiatul Mubashireen in 2008

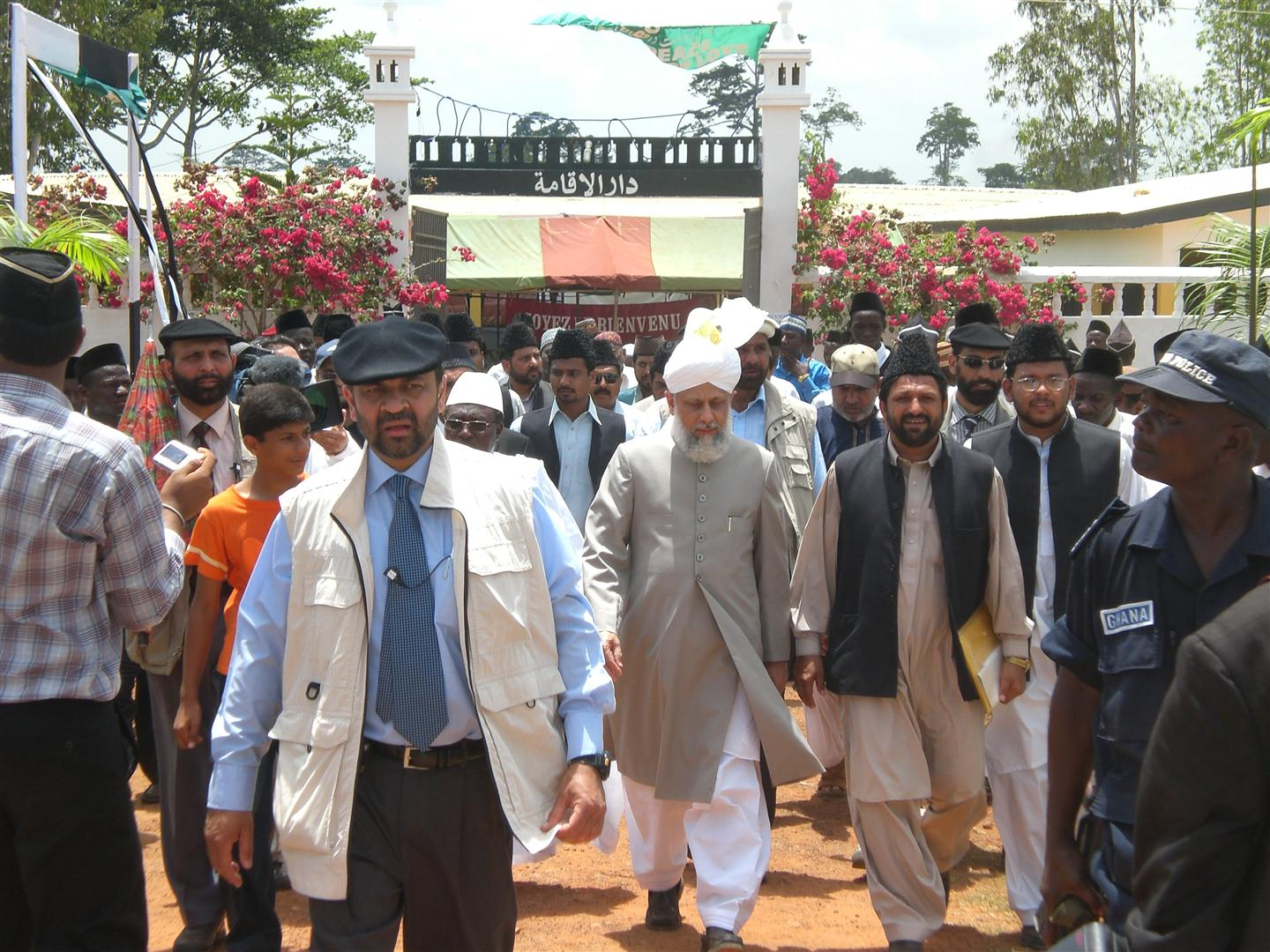
Khalifatul Massih V's visit to Jamiatul Mubashireen in 2008

== See also ==
- List of Ahmadiyya Muslim Community buildings and structures
