= Batala Junction railway station =

Railway station in Punjab

Batala
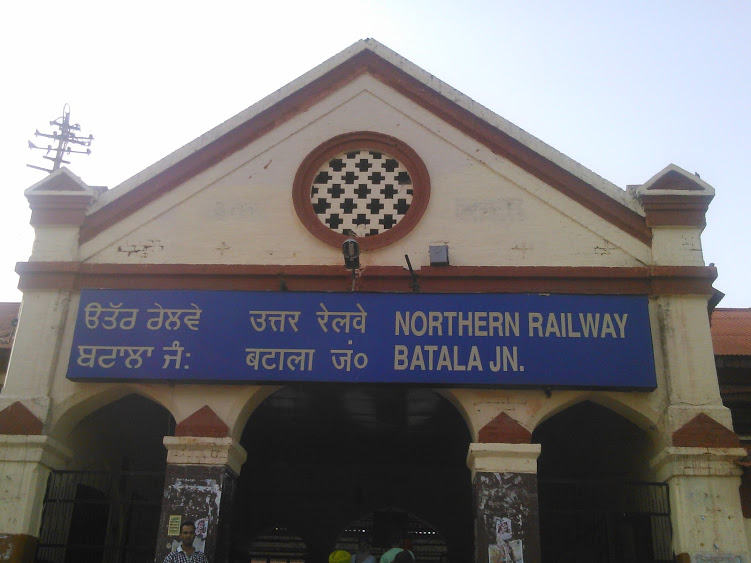

General information
- Location: Dera Baba Nanak Road, Batala, Punjab; India
- Coordinates: 31°49′18″N 75°11′40″E
- Elevation: 250 metres (820 ft)
- System: Indian Railways junction station
- Owner: Indian Railways
- Operator: Northern Railway
- Lines: Amritsar–Pathankot line; Batala–Qadian line; Amritsar–Jammu main line
- Platforms: 2
- Tracks: 5 ft 6 in (1,676 mm) broad gauge

Construction
- Structure type: Standard on ground
- Parking: Yes
- Cycle facilities: No

Other information
- Status: Functioning
- Station code: BAT
- Division(s): Ferozpore

History
- Opened: 1884

Services
Preceding station	Indian Railways	Following station
Jaintipura towards ?	Northern Railway zone Amritsar–Pathankot line	Chhina towards ?
Terminus	Northern Railway zone Batala–Qadian link	Qadian towards ?
Location
- Location within Punjab

Batala Railway Station is located in Gurdaspur district in the Indian state of Punjab and serves the industrial town of Batala.

== The railway station ==
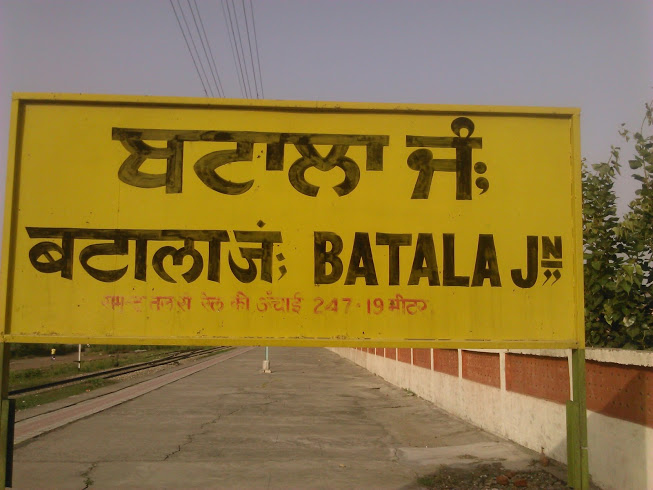

Batala railway station is at an elevation of 247.19 metres (811.0 ft) and was assigned the code – BAT.

== History ==
The 107 km (66 mi) long 1,676 mm (5 ft 6 in)-wide 5 ft 6 in (1,676 mm) broad gauge Amritsar–Pathankot line was opened in 1884. It originally belonged to the local government and was transferred to North Western Railway in 1892.

== Developments ==
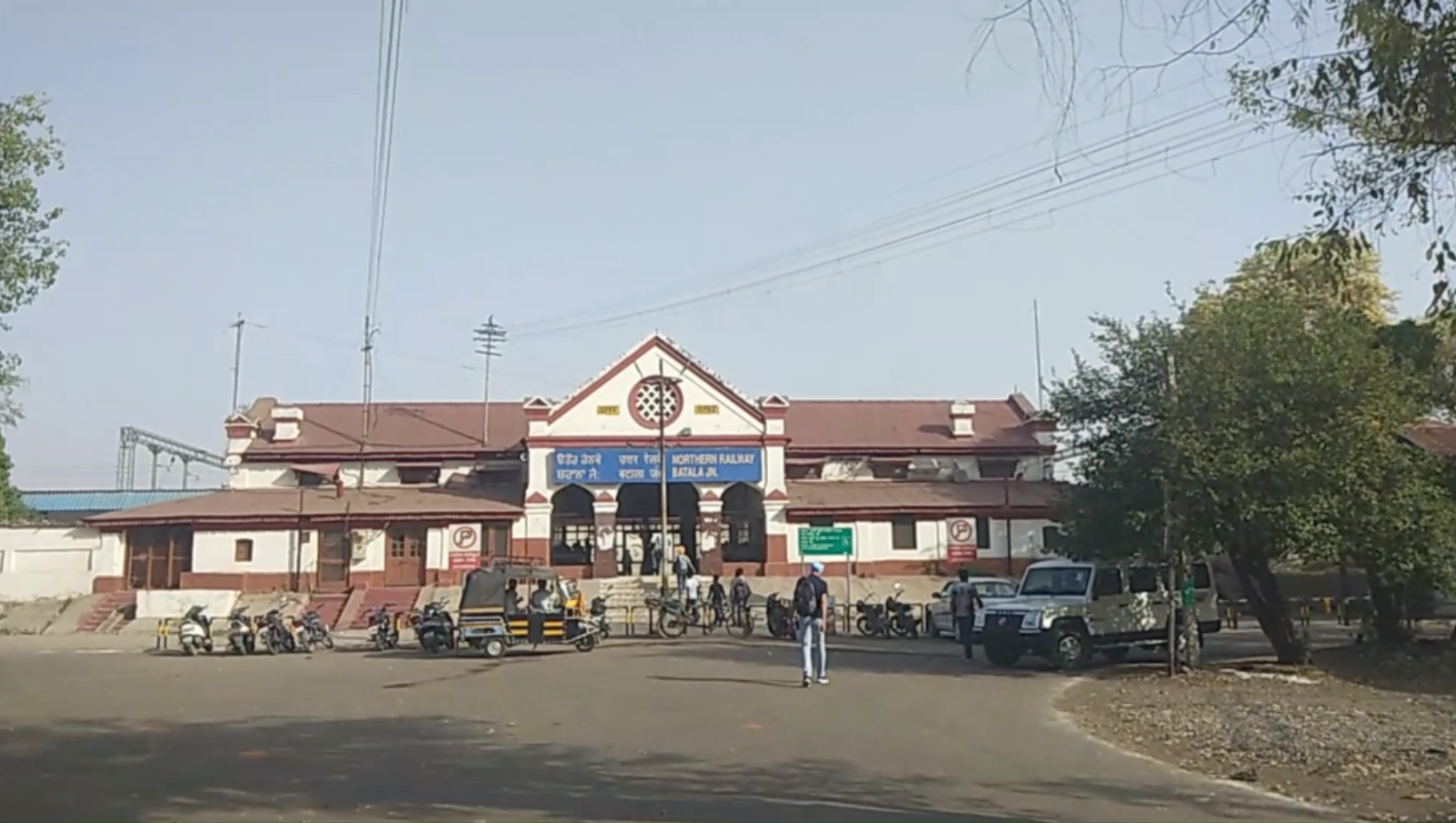
Full view of Batala Railway Station

The 39.68 km (25 mi) Qadian–Beas link was approved in 2011. It would provide direct and shorter access from Batala to Ambala–Attari line.
