= Mirza Faiz Muhammad =

- Raʾīs; Qāzi; Azādud Daulah; Haft Hazārī
- Predecessor: Muhammad Qaim
- Successor: Mirza Gul Muhammad
- Born: Qadian, Mughal Empire
- Died: Qadian, Mughal Empire
- House: Barlas
- Religion: Islam

Mirza Faiz Muhammad, also known by his title of Azādud Daulah, was a Mughal nobleman and official in the Mughal Empire during the 18th century. He was a descendant of Mirza Hadi Beg and the great-great grandfather of Mirza Ghulam Ahmed of Qadian.

== Life and reign ==
During Faiz Muhammad's life, Qadian had developed close relations with Delhi. Faiz Muhammad was successful in suppressing the anarchy that prevailed in the Punjab during this period as a result of which, in 1716, the Mughal Emperor Farrukhsiyar conferred upon him the rank of Haft Hazārī which authorised him to keep regular force of 7,000 soldiers. He was also conferred the title Azādud Daulah (Strong Arm of the Government) by the Emperor.
