= Noor Hospital =

Noor Hospital Qadian
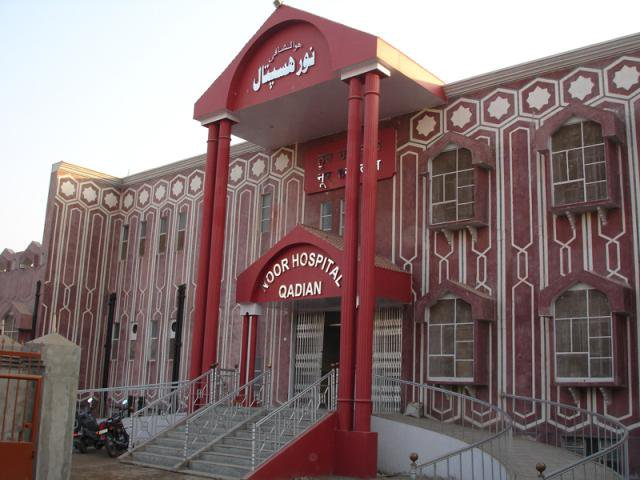
- Main Building

Geography
- Location: Qadian, Gurdaspur, Punjab, India

History
- Founded: 1917

Links
- Lists: Hospitals in India

Noor Hospital Qadian is the oldest multidisciplinary hospital at city of Qadian in Punjab state of India. The hospital was established in 1917 to cater to the needs of local residents. The hospital traces its history back to the period of Mirza Ghulam Ahmad, the founder of the worldwide Ahmadiyya Muslim Community who was born in Qadian in 1835. A time when there was no hospital in Qadian he used to provide free medical assistance with great sympathy to the people of Qadian and outskirts. Noor Hospital has been named after the first khalifa (caliph) of Ahmadiyya Muslim Community Hakeem Noor-ud-Din, he was a renowned physician of that time. Before settling in Qadian, in 1876 he was employed as the royal physician to Maharaja Ranbir Singh the ruler of Jammu and Kashmir.

== Departments ==
- Department of English Medicine
- Department of Homeopathic Medicine
