= Aqsa Mosque, Qadian =

Mosque in Qadian, Punjab, India

Aqsa Mosque
- مسجد اقصی
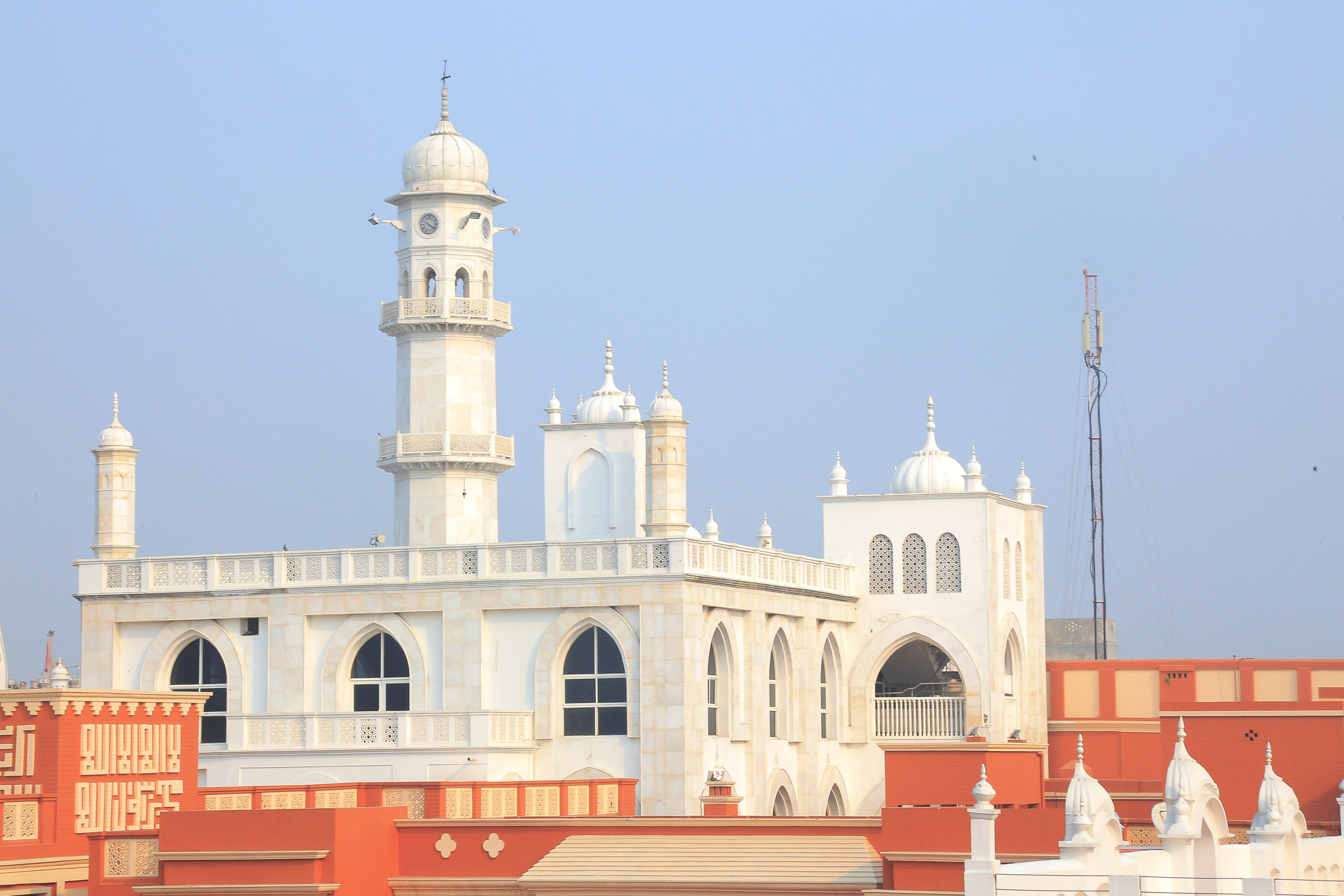
- The mosque in 2015

- Location of the mosque in Punjab, India

Religion
- Affiliation: Islam
- Branch/tradition: Ahmadiyya
- Ecclesiastical or organizational status: Mosque
- Status: Active

Location
- Location: Qadian, Gurdaspur, Punjab
- Country: India
- Interactive map of Aqsa Mosque
- Coordinates: 31°49′8″N 75°22′44″E

Architecture
- Type: Mosque architecture
- Style: Qajar
- Founder: Mirza Ghulam Murtaza
- Completed: 1876 CE

Specifications
- Capacity: 15,000 worshippers
- Dome: 5
- Minarets: 1 large; 8 small
- Minaret height: 32 m (105 ft)

Website
- ahmadiyyamuslimjamaat.in

The Aqsa Mosque, also known as the Masjid Aqsa (Urdu: مسجدِ اقصیٰ), is a historical mosque located in Qadian, in the Gurdaspur district of the state of Punjab, India.

The 19th-century mosque is the largest and oldest mosque in Qadian, and is situated inside the compound of the ancestrial house of Mirza Ghulam Ahmad, close to the White Minaret, and located in the Ahmadiyya Mohallah of Qadian.

== History ==
The mosque was built in 1876 by Mirza Ghulam Murtaza, father of Mirza Ghulam Ahmad, the founder of the Ahmadiyya movement. The land on which the mosque lies upon was purchased in an auction, and prior to 1875, it was previously utilised for a prison. Some suggest the land was also used for a local court of law.

In January 1938, a loudspeaker was installed in Aqsa Mosque for the first time. At that time, the second caliph, Mirza Basheer-ud-Din Mahmood Ahmad, gave a sermon on this.

=== Expansion ===
Throughout the 20th century, the mosque was renovated and repeatedly extended by the Ahmadiyya administration and, as of 2014, the capacity of the building has increased to 15,000 worshippers, from its initial capacity of 200.

== See also ==
- Mubarak Mosque, Qadian
- Noor Mosque, Qadian
- Islam in India
- List of mosques in India
- White Minaret
