= Nangal Bagbana =

- Village
- Country: India
- State: Punjab
- District: Gurdaspur
- Tehsil: Batala
- Region: Majha

Government
  - Type: Panchayat raj
  - Body: Gram panchayat

Area
  - Total: 247 ha (610 acres)

Population (2011)
  - Total: 1,355; 731/624 ♂/♀
  - Scheduled Castes: 249; 137/112 ♂/♀
  - Total Households: 278

Languages
  - Official: Punjabi
- Time zone: UTC+5:30 (IST)
- Telephone: 01871
- ISO 3166 code: IN-PB
- Vehicle registration: PB-18
- Website: gurdaspur.nic.in

Nangal Bagbana is a village in Batala in Gurdaspur district of Punjab State, India. It is located 17 kilometres (11 mi) from sub district headquarter, 35 kilometres (22 mi) from district headquarter and 2 kilometres (1.2 mi) from Sri Hargobindpur. The village is administrated by Sarpanch an elected representative of the village.

== Demography ==
As of 2011, the village has a total number of 278 houses and a population of 1355 of which 731 are males while 624 are females. According to the report published by Census India in 2011, out of the total population of the village 249 people are from Schedule Caste and the village does not have any Schedule Tribe population so far.

== See also ==
- List of villages in India
