= White Minaret =

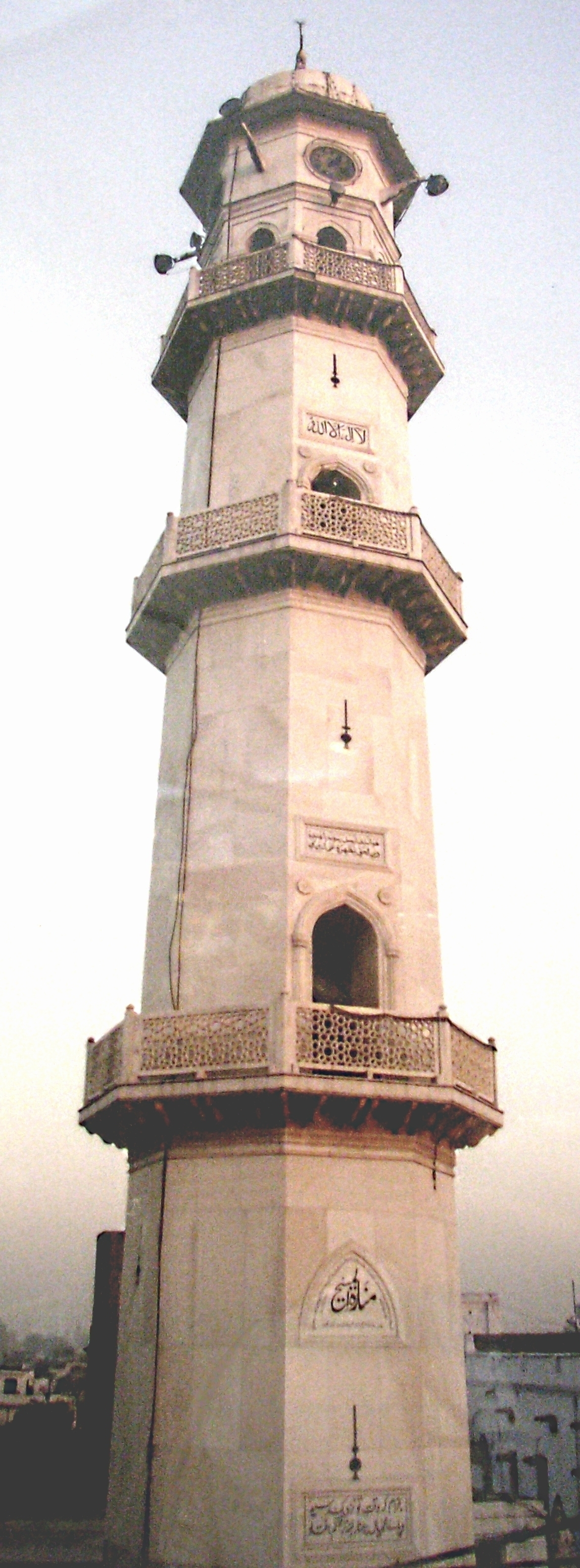
- The minaret in Qadian

- Location within Punjab
- 31°49′4″N 75°23′31″E
- Location: Qadian, Gurdaspur, Jalandhar Division, Punjab, India

History
- tt: 13 March 1903
- Founded: 1916

Site notes
- Height: 105 feet (32 m)
- Owner: Ahmadiyya Muslim Community

The White Minaret is a stone minaret beside the Aqsa Mosque in Qadian, Punjab. It was constructed under the direction of the Indian religious leader Mirza Ghulam Ahmad. It serves as a lighthouse symbolising the ultimate pre-eminence of Islam.

The minaret has three stages, 92 steps, and a total height of about 105 ft or 32 m. Its construction was completed in 1916 and has since become a symbol and distinctive mark in Ahmadiyya Islam. The minaret features on the Ahmadiyya flag and also (sometimes with rays of light) in the movement's major publications.

== History and purpose ==
Islamic tradition holds that Jesus would descend at a white minaret to the east of Damascus. According to Mirza Ghulam Ahmad, who held himself as manifestation of Jesus, this prophecy was fulfilled with his advent in Qadian, a town situated directly to the east of Damascus, and the significance of the minaret was symbolic. Reference to a white minaret, according to him, symbolised the spread of Islamic teachings linked to the coming of the Messiah, which would enlighten the world and lead to Islam's ultimate pre-eminence. Ghulam Ahmad wrote:

Just as you can see that the lamp placed on top of a minaret spreads its light far and wide, and just as lightning in one part of the sky also illuminates all other parts, so too will it be in these days...The true nature of the tower of the Messiah that is mentioned in the ahadith is that the Messiah’s invitation and message will spread on this earth very quickly, just as light or sound from a tower reaches far.

With reference to the Messiah appearing to the east of Damascus – a commercial city within the Christian Byzantine Empire during Muhammad's time – In a tract published on 28 May 1900, Ghulam Ahmad linked Biblical prophecies concerning the return of Christ with those found in the Quran and Hadith, stating that they pointed in the same direction for a specific reason, particularly the one mentioned by Jesus in the 24th chapter of the Gospel of Matthew:

For as the lightning cometh out of the east and shineth even unto the west; so shall also the coming of the Son of Man be. For wheresoever the carcase is, there will the eagles be gathered together.

— Matthew 24:27–28

According to Ghulam Ahmad, specific mention in the hadith of the east of Damascus with reference to the promised Messiah, carried a deeply religious significance since it was in Damascus that Paul of Tarsus laid the foundation of the doctrine of Trinity and divinity of Jesus and therefore the seed for the corruption of Christian beliefs, according to him, was first sown in Damascus. From there this erroneous idea had spread to other countries with Paul’s preaching, particularly towards the West. It was therefore fitting that the Messiah appear from the East and, like the sun, illumine through his teachings even the West where the Christian faith would at the time be ascendant. In the same tract, he wrote:

Now our adversaries, though they repeatedly read this hadith of Damascus, yet they are unable to answer as to what the message contained in that which has been stated in it is, namely that the promised Messiah will descend near the minaret that is to the east of Damascus. Rather they have considered this hadith like a mere story, but let it be remembered that this is no story and that God is pure from useless actions…This passage did not mean that the minaret is a part of Damascus and is situated in Damascus as has unfortunately been understood. Rather, it meant that the light of [the teachings of] the promised Messiah will rise, like the sun, from a direction to the east of Damascus and dispel the Western darkness. And this was a subtle indication for the minaret of the Messiah, near which he is to descend, had been declared as being to the east of Damascus and the Damascene Trinity was kept to its western side. And thus was it foretold about the age to come, that when the promised Messiah comes, he will make his appearance like the sun which comes out of the east, and as opposed to him, the lifeless lamp of Trinity that is situated towards the west, will fade away day by day.

— Majmooa Ishtiharat,

Although Ghulam Ahmad interpreted the prophecy symbolically, with the publication of the announcement in 1900, he sought to construct a physical structure representing the fulfilment of the prophecy and solicited donations for the building of the minaret laying its foundation on 13 March 1903. The minaret, according to him, was to be a physical representation of the fulfilment of the prophecy and a monument signifying the advent of the Promised Messiah with a light and a clock fixed on its top symbolising the light of Islamic teachings spreading far and wide and "so that Man will recognize his time", and a Muezzin to give the call to prayer five times a day symbolising an invitation to Islam. Though the foundation stone for the minaret was laid in 1903, construction subsequently stopped due to a lack of funds. Work continued under Mirza Bashir-ud-Din Mahmud, the second Ahmadiyya caliph in 1914, reaching completion in 1916. Bright lights were fixed at the top of the minaret. These lights were not fixed so as to brighten the minaret itself but were instead pointing away from the minaret thereby representing its Lighthouse status. The clock was not fixed until 1933 and in the late 1930s it was coated with plaster of white marble. In 1980, it was veneered with white marble slabs.

== Bibliography ==
- Bentlage, Björn; Eggert, Marion; Krämer, Hans-Martin; Reichmuth, Stefan (2016). Religious Dynamics under the Impact of Imperialism and Colonialism: A Sourcebook. Brill. ISBN 9789004329003.
