= Mubarak Mosque, Qadian =

Mosque in Qadian, Punjab, India

Mubarak Mosque
- مسجد مبارک
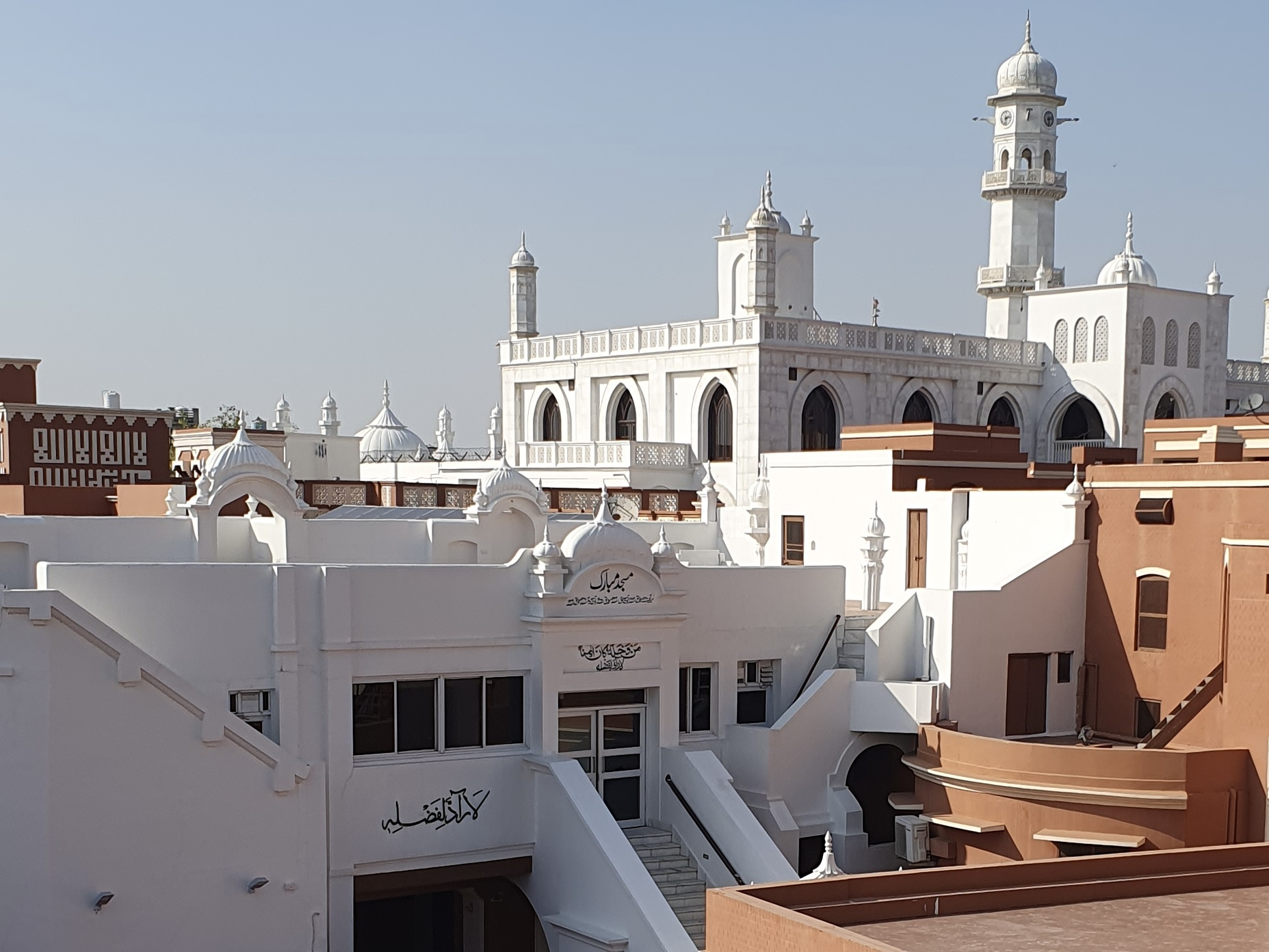
- The Mubarak Mosque with the Aqsa Mosque and White Minaret in the background

- Location of the mosque in Punjab

Religion
- Affiliation: Islam
- Branch/tradition: Ahmadiyya
- Ecclesiastical or organizational status: Mosque
- Status: Active

Location
- Location: Qadian, Gurdaspur Punjab
- Country: India
- Interactive map of Mubarak Mosque
- Coordinates: 31°49′11.5″N 75°22′26.3″E

Architecture
- Type: Mosque architecture
- Style: Qajar
- Groundbreaking: 1882
- Completed: 1883
- Capacity: 600 worshippers
- Inscriptions: One (maybe more)

The Mubarak Mosque or Masjid Mubarak (Urdu: مسجد مبارک, lit. 'Blessed Mosque') is a mosque, located in Qadian, in the Gurdaspur district of the state of Punjab, India. It is considered as the first mosque built after the founding of the Ahmadiyya Muslim Community. It is located in the heart of Qadian, in the rear of the Aqsa Mosque, the first mosque of Qadian.

== History ==
The foundations for the mosque was laid in 1882 and the mosque was opened in 1883 by Mirza Ghulam Ahmad, the founder of the Ahmadiyya Movement.

=== Religious significance ===
In Ahmadi theology, the mosque holds divine importance, as the building of the mosque was the first divinely task assigned to Mirza Ghulam Ahmad by God. In the Revealed Sermon, Ahmad alludes the mosque to Sura Bani Isra'il Verse 2 - in relation to the Mi'raj.

=== Expansion ===
The mosque was first expanded in the 1907, prior to the death Ahmad, and the second expansion took place in 1944 during the reign of Mirza Basheer-ud-Din Mahmood Ahmad.

== Architecture ==
=== Inscription ===
The entrance to the mosque has the following inscription in Arabic:

مُبَارِكٌ وَّ مُبَارَكٌ وَّ كُلُّ اَمْرٍ مُّبَارَكٍ يُّجْعَلُ فِيْهِ

When translated into English, the inscription reads:

“This mosque is a source of blessings, is blessed itself, and every blessed deed will be performed in it.”

== See also ==
- Aqsa Mosque, Qadian
- Ahmadiyya in India
- Islam in India
- List of mosques in India
