= Qadian =

- Town
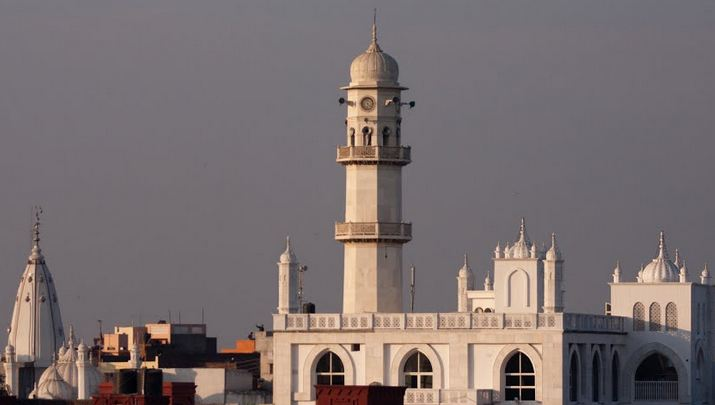
- The Minaret-ul-Masih of Aqsa Mosque is one of the major landmarks of Qadian. (A Mandir and a Gurudwara can be seen in the background)

- Location in Punjab, India Qadian (India)
- Coordinates: 31°49′09″N 75°22′35″E
- Country: India
- State: Punjab
- District: Gurdaspur
- Elevation: 250 m (820 ft)

Population (2000)
  - Total: 40,827

Languages
  - Official: Punjabi
- Time zone: UTC+5:30 (IST)
- Postal code: 143516

Qadian (Note: or known by its full name Qadian Darul Aman; Urdu: قادیان دار الامان, romanized: qādiyān dār al-amān, lit. 'Qadian Abode of Peace') (Punjabi pronunciation: [käːd̪ijä̃˩˥ː]; Urdu pronunciation: [qɑːd̪ijɑ̃ːn]) is a town and a municipal council in Gurdaspur district, north-east of Amritsar, situated 18 kilometres (11 mi) north-east of Batala city in the state of Punjab, India. Qadian is the birthplace of Mirza Ghulam Ahmad, the founder of the Ahmadiyya movement within Islam. It remained the headquarters of the movement until the Partition of India in 1947.

== History ==
Qadian was established in 1530 by Mirza Hadi Baig, a religious scholar dedicated to Islam and the first Qazi in the area. Mirza Hadi Baig was from a royal household of Mirza of the Mughal Empire. He migrated from Samarkand and settled in Punjab where he was granted a vast tract of land comprising 80 villages by the emperor Babur. Because of his religious beliefs, he named the center of the 80 villages Islam Pur Qazi and governed from there. Over time, the name of the town changed to Qazi Maji, then Qadi, and eventually it became known as 'Qadian'. The term Qadiani is used as a slur to refer to Ahmadi Muslims, primarily in Pakistan.

Qadian and the surrounding areas later fell to the Ramgarhia Sikhs under the leadership of Jassa Singh Ramgarhia who offered the ruling Qazis, two villages which they refused. In 1834, during the rule of Maharaja Ranjit Singh, the region consisting of Qadian and five adjoining villages was given to Mirza Ghulam Murtaza, father of Ghulam Ahmad in return for military support in Kashmir, Mahadi, the Kulu valley, Peshawar and Hazara.

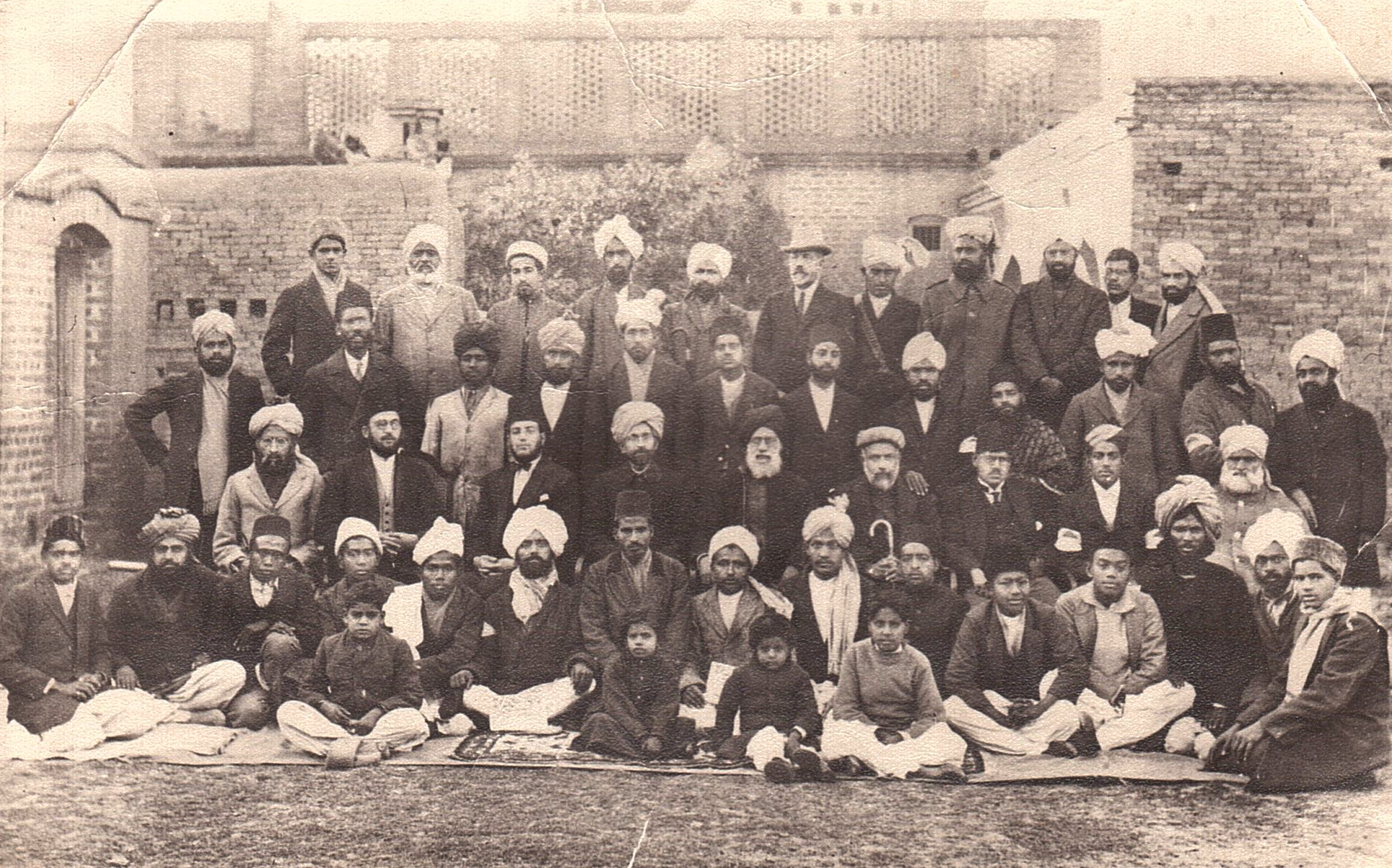
Members of the Ahmadiyya Muslim Community in Qadian.

=== Ahmadiyya Movement ===
A remote and unknown town, Qadian emerged as a centre of religious learning in 1889, when Mirza Ghulam Ahmad established the Ahmadiyya Muslim Community. It was historically a Muslim-majority town, a Muslim enclave within the wider Gurdaspur District in British Punjab.

In 1891 it became the venue for the community's annual gatherings. Qadian remained the administrative headquarters and capital of the Ahmadiyya Caliphate until the partition of India in 1947, when much of the Community migrated to Pakistan.

=== Partition ===
Prior to the Partition of India, Qadian being the central headquarters of the Ahmadiyya Muslim Community, had around 14,000 Ahmadis spread across approximately 19 different neighborhoods and villages. Following the partition, Mirza Bashir-ud-Din Mahmud Ahmad, the second Khalifa of the Community, carefully oversaw the safe migration of Ahmadis from Qadian to the newly founded state, instructing 313 men, including two of his own sons, to stay in Qadian and guard the sites holy to Ahmadis, conferring upon them the title darveshān-i qādiyān (the dervishes of Qadian) and eventually moving the headquarters to Rabwah, Pakistan.

Qadian experienced extreme violence and bloodshed during and after the partition of India, and many of its neighbouring areas and villages became devoid of Muslims, who were either lynched or displaced by militant Sikhs and Hindus backed by the Indian Army at that time. Despite many Muslims deciding to remain in India, in Qadian or its neighboring areas, they were, at a low, persecuted, or forthrightly killed. A curfew on Qadian was intermittent for several months after the partition. Many religious places were either forcibly occupied and converted, defaced, ransacked and or vandalised.

At the height of violence during the partition, Qadian had become a makeshift refugee camp for over 50,000 displaced Muslims.

== Geography ==
Qadian is located at 31.82°N 75.39°E. It has an average elevation of 250 metres (820 feet).

== Demographics ==
A welcome signboard in Qadian in Punjabi, Urdu, and English respectively

Qadian has a population of 23,632. Males constituted 54% of the population and females 46%. Qadian has an average literacy rate of 75%, slightly higher than the national average of 74.04%: male literacy is 78%, and female literacy is 70%. 10% of the population is under 6 years of age.

=== Languages ===
Most of the residents of Qadian are speakers of the Punjabi language. A significant minority, about a 1/10 of the population, also speak the Urdu language. In areas like Mohallah Ahmadiyya, Urdu signs are a common sight.

Languages by the number of speakers in Qadian according to the 2011 Census of India
1. Punjabi (86.0%)
2. Urdu (9.00%)
3. Hindi (4.00%)
4. Other (1.00%)

=== Religion ===
Religion in Qadian
Religion	Percent
Hinduism	51.89%
Sikhism	31.44%
Islam	12.97%
Christianity	3.33%
Others	0.37%

Hinduism is the largest religion in Qadian, with significant populations of the adherents of Sikhism and Islam. The table below shows the population of different religious groups in Qadian and their gender ratio, as of 2011 census.

Population by religious groups in Qadian, 2011 census
Religion	Total	Female	Male	Gender ratio
Hindu	12,263	5,764	6,499	886
Sikh	7,431	3,599	3,832	939
Muslim	3,065	1,312	1,753	748
Christian	788	375	413	907
Jain	2	0	2	--
Other religions	13	6	7	857
Not stated	70	27	43	627
Total	23,632	11,083	12,549	883

==== Islam ====
Today in Qadian, there are 11 mosques belonging to the Ahmadiyya community most of which date before the partition. Initially the majority of the mosques were based on the Urdu neighbourhood names (with the exception of Aqsa Mosque and Mubarak Mosque), but many have been renamed, following their renovation in 2012.

- Aqsa Mosque (1876)
- Mubarak Mosque (1883)
- Noor Mosque (1910)
- Nasirabad Mosque (1913)
- Fazl Mosque (1914)
- Rahman Mosque (1927)
- Subhan Mosque (1935)
- Mumtaz Mosque (1936)
- Anwaar Mosque (1939)
- Masroor Mosque (2015)

Further, three mosques existed prior to the partition, but have since been occupied, namely:

- Darul Fazl Mosque
- Darus Sa'at Mosque
- Starhousry Factory Mosque

Outside of Qadian, in the neighbouring areas, an additional four mosques of Kahlwan and Nangal Bagbana exist, namely:

Name	Year	Area
Tahir Mosque	1997	Nangal
Basharat Mosque	Pre-partition	Nangal
Basheer Mosque		Nangal
Mehdi Mosque	2004	Kahlwan
Mahmood Mosque	2012	Kahlwan

== Transport ==
=== Railway ===
Qadian is connected through its railway station, which was built back in November 1928. It is located in the Darul Barakat area and served by the 'Mela special line', a 55-kilometer track, linking it to Amritsar via Batala, with a proposed Qadian-Beas Line which was sanctioned back in 2011.

== Politics ==
The town is part of the Qadian Assembly Constituency.

== Notable monuments ==
- Jamia Ahmadiyya Qadian
- Bahishti Maqbara cemetery

== Hospitals ==
- Noor Hospital

== Education ==
Before the partition, two major educational institutes in Qadian were established. The Talim-ul-Islam High School was founded in 1889, and the Talim-ul-Islam College was founded in 1898. During the partition, these institutes were forcibly occupied and the college was converted and continues to operate as the Sikh National College.

Today around 13 educational institutes exist consisting of several public schools, along with a number of private educational institutes such as:

- Jamia Ahmadiyya Qadian
- Talim-ul-Islam Senior Secondary School
- Nusrat Girls High School
- Nusrat Women College

== Notable people ==
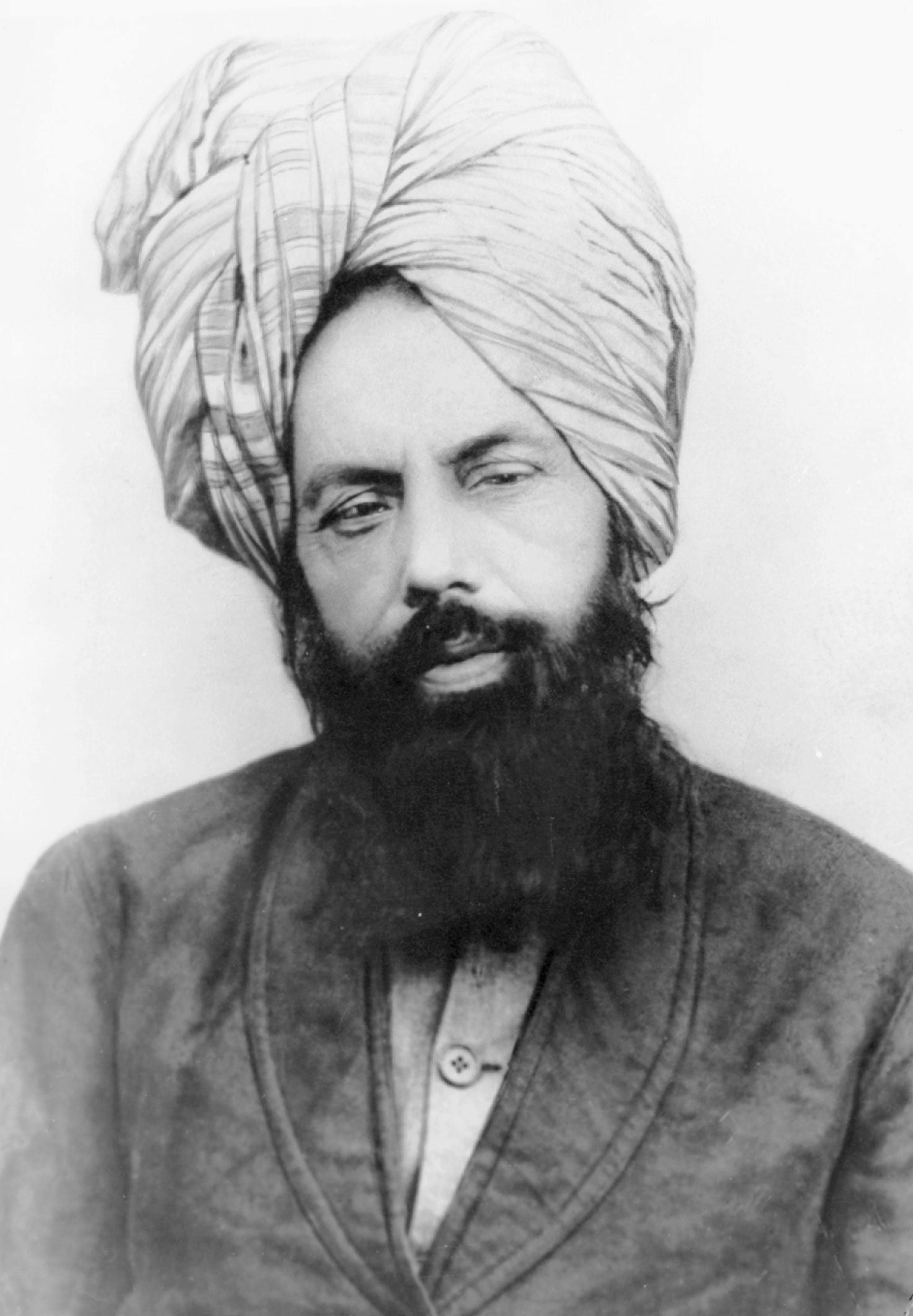
Mirza Ghulam Ahmad, founder of the Ahmadiyya Muslim Movement

Although Qadian is relatively remote and has a very small population, it has many notable historical, religious and political figures;

=== Religious Leaders ===
- Mirza Ghulam Ahmad

==== Ahmadiyya Caliphs ====
- Hakeem Noor-ud-Din from 1908 to 1914
- Mirza Basheer-ud-Din Mahmood Ahmad from 1914 to 1965
- Mirza Nasir Ahmad from 1965 to 1982
- Mirza Tahir Ahmad from 1982 to 2003

=== Poets ===
- Shiv Kumar Batalvi

=== Military Leaders ===
- Dilbagh Singh
- Mirza Ghulam Murtaza
- Mirza Hadi Baig

=== Politicians ===
- Tripat Rajinder Singh Bajwa
- Partap Singh Bajwa
- Charanjit Kaur Bajwa

== Bibliography ==
- Kobeisy, Ahmed Nezar (2004). Counseling American Muslims: Understanding the Faith and Helping the People. Greenwood Publishing Group. ISBN 9780313324727.
