= List of Ahmadis =

This is an incomplete list of notable Ahmadi Muslims, members of the Ahmadiyya Muslim Community - a movement within Islam.

== Religious figures ==
=== Founder ===
- Mirza Ghulam Ahmad – The founder of the Ahmadiyya movement

=== Caliphs ===
- Hakeem Noor-ud-Din – First Caliph
- Mirza Basheer-ud-Din Mahmood Ahmad – Second Caliph
- Mirza Nasir Ahmad – Third Caliph
- Mirza Tahir Ahmad – Fourth Caliph
- Mirza Masroor Ahmad – Fifth Caliph and current leader of the worldwide Ahmadiyya Muslim Community

=== Companions ===
- Mufti Muhammad Sadiq
- A. R. Dard
- Abdul Rahim Nayyar
- Maulvi Sher Ali
- Fateh Muhammad Sial
- Shams ud Din Khan
- Khwaja Kamal-ud-Din
- Maulana Muhammad Ali
- Malik Ghulam Farid
- Mirza Bashir Ahmad
- Khwaja Nazir Ahmad
- Qazi Muhammad Yousaf
- Mirza Muhammad Ismail
- Sayyid Abdul Latif

=== Missionaries ===
- Bashir Ahmad Orchard – First Missionary of the Ahmadiyya Community of European descent
- Abdul Wahab Adam – Ameer (Head) of the Ahmadiyya Muslim Mission, Ghana; member of National Peace Council; member of National Reconciliation Commission

=== Lahore Ahmadiyya Emirs ===
- Maulana Muhammad Ali
- Saeed Ahmad Khan
- Asghar Hameed
- Maulana Sadr-ud-Din
- Abdul Karim Saeed Pasha

== Royalty ==
=== Kings ===
==== Beninese ====
- Kpodégbé Lanmanfan Toyi Djigla – King of the Fon State of Alada; President of the Supreme Council of Kings of Benin
- Akpaki Dagbara II – King of the Bariba State of Paraku, Benin
- Egba Kotan II – King of the Yoruba State of Dassa, Benin
- Orou Igbo Akambi – King of Toui, Benin

==== Other nationalities ====
- Musendiku Buraimoh Adeniji Adele II – King of Lagos, Nigeria
- Mumuni Koray – Ruler of Wa, Ghana

=== Other royalty ===
- Khalil Gamanga – Paramount Chief of the Simbaru Chiefdom, Kenema District, Sierra Leone
- Kenawa Gamanga – Paramount Chief of the Simbaru Chiefdom, Kenema District, Sierra Leone

== Artists ==
=== Musicians ===
- Yusef Lateef – American Ahmadi spokesperson; Jazz multi-instrumentalist; Grammy Award winner
- Ahmad Jamal – American jazz pianist
- Art Blakey – American jazz drummer
- Rudy Powell – American jazz reed player
- Sahib Shihab – American jazz saxophonist
- Dakota Staton – American jazz vocalist
- McCoy Tyner – American jazz pianist
- Sadik Hakim – American jazz pianist
- Abbey Lincoln – American jazz vocalist, songwriter, actress
- Talib Dawud – Anitguan-born American jazz trumpeter
- Ahmed Abdul-Malik – American jazz double bassist
- Idrees Sulieman – American jazz trumpeter
- Aamir Zaki – Pakistani guitarist

=== Writers ===
- Aziz Kashmiri – Kashmiri journalist
- Wage Rudolf Supratman – Indonesian National Hero and songwriter; wrote the national anthem of Indonesia, "Indonesian Raya"
- Muhammad Fazal Khan Changwi – translator of works by Ibn Arabi
- Qalandar Momand – Pakistani poet, writer, journalist, critic, academician, lexicographer. Recipient of Pakistan's Pride of Performance civil award, the National Award for Democracy and Sitara-e-Imtiaz
- Obaidullah Aleem – Urdu poet
- Babatunde Jose – Nigerian journalist
- Hadayatullah Hübsch – German writer and journalist
- Khola Maryam Hübsch – German writer and journalist, daughter of Hadayatullah
- Qasim Rashid – American writer
- Sabir Zafar – Pakistani songwriter, lyricist and poet.
- Qamar Ajnalvi – Pakistani novelist

=== Actors ===
- Mahershala Ali – American actor, first Muslim actor to win an Oscar

== Politicians ==
=== Ghanaians ===
- Alhaji Mahama Iddrisu – member of the Council of State and former Minister for Defence
- Alhaji Malik Al-Hassan Yakubu – member of Pan-African Parliament and former Minister for Interior
- Kobina Tahir Hammond – Member of Parliament for Adansi Asokwa, Ashanti Region
- Ameen Salifu – Member of Parliament for Wa East, Upper West Region
- Alhaji Issifu Ali – former co-chairman of the National Democratic Congress
- Musheibu Mohammed Alfa – Deputy Minister of Environment, Science and Innovation
- Mahmud Khalid – former Minister of State for Upper West Region
- Alhaji Mumuni Abudu Seidu – former Minister of State without portfolio; former Member of Parliament, Wa Central, Upper West Region
- Alhaji Mogtari Sahanun – former Ghana ambassador to Burkina Faso; former Minister of State for Upper West Region

=== Nigerians ===
- Alhaji Abdul Azeez Kolawole Adeyemo – Member of Parliament, front-line member of Action Group political party, Ondo State Parliamentary Co-ordinator
- Alhaji Jibril Martin – president of the Nigerian Youth Movement; cofounder and chairman of the Hajj Pilgrims’ Board of Nigeria's western region

=== Pakistanis ===
- Muhammad Zafrulla Khan – President of the UN General Assembly, First Foreign Minister of Pakistan, President of the International Court of Justice

=== United Kingdom ===
- Tariq Ahmad, Baron Ahmad of Wimbledon – Member of the House of Lords, UK, Minister for the Commonwealth and the United Nations at the Foreign and Commonwealth Office.
- Iftikhar A. Ayaz – Tuvaluan consular official, UK
- Imran Ahmad Khan – Member of Parliament (MP) for Wakefield.

=== Other nationalities ===
- Farimang Mamadi Singateh – second and last Governor General of The Gambia
- Sahibzada Abdul Latif – Afghan Ahmadi Muslim martyr; king Abdur Rahman Khan's advisor; government representative for the Durand Line
- Amir Abedi – first African mayor of Dar es Salam, Tanzania
- Barakat Ahmad – Indian diplomat
- Muhammad Fiaz – Member of the Legislative Assembly of Saskatchewan, Canada

== International bodies ==
- Muhammad Zafrulla Khan – President of the UN General Assembly, first Foreign Minister of Pakistan, President of the International Court of Justice
- M M Ahmad – former executive director and vice president of the World Bank
- Karim Ahmad Khan – Chief prosecutor of the International Criminal Court

== Military ==
- Air Marshal Zafar Chaudhry – first Chief of Air Staff and a three-star general of the Pakistan Air Force
- Lieutenant General Akhtar Hussain Malik – lieutenant general of the Pakistan Army
- Major General Iftikhar Janjua Shaheed – major general of the Pakistan Army; 1965 war hero, killed in the 1971 war
- Major General A. M. Mahmuduzzaman – Former Principal Staff Officer of the Bangladesh Army and Bangladesh's ambassador to South Korea
- Lieutenant General Abdul Ali Malik – Pakistani war hero of the Chawinda, 1965 Indo-Pakistan war
- Major General Abdullah Saeed – Commandant of the Pakistan Military Academy at Kakul, Chief Martial Law Administrator for Baluchistan, Pakistan

== Business and economics ==
- M M Ahmad – former executive director and vice president of the World Bank
- Faysal Sohail – American venture capitalist
- Atif Mian – Top 25 Economist of the world. Prime Minister Imran Khan selected Mian as one of Pakistan's economists, he reached international notability in 2018 after his forced removal because he is an Ahmadi Muslim. The International Monetary Fund (IMF) identified Mian as one of twenty-five economists it expects to shape the world's thinking about the global economy in the future.
- Amjad Khan Chowdhury– Founder of PRAN-RFL Group

== Scientists ==
- Professor Abdus Salam – First Pakistani and first Ahmadi Muslim recipient of a Nobel Prize in Physics
- Mujaddid Ahmed Ijaz – Pakistani-American experimental physicist noted for his role in discovering new isotopes
- Mojib Latif – German meteorologist and oceanographer of Pakistani descent
- Hafiz Saleh Muhammad Alladin – Indian astronomer, professor at Osmania University, Hydrabad, India
- Baron Omar Rolf von Ehrenfels – Austrian German Orientalist and anthropologist

== Sportspersons ==
- Abdul Jeelani – American professional basketball player
- Adnan Virk – Canadian sports anchor
- Waseem Ahmed - Pakistani field hockey player and ex-captain of Pakistan hockey team
- Naseer Malik – Pakistani fast bowler (cricket), bowled the first ball for Pakistan in the first-ever Cricket World Cup

== Others ==
- Sitara Brooj Akbar – World's youngest O'Levels awardee and IELTS candidate.
- A. George Baker – American Protestant clergyman who converted to Islam
- Asad Shah – British murder victim of a religiously motivated attack
- Nazhat Shameem – Former High Court Judge, Fiji
- Shaista Shameem – Indo-Fijian lawyer; former director of the Fiji Human Rights Commission
