= Ahmadiyya in Ghana =

Islamic movement

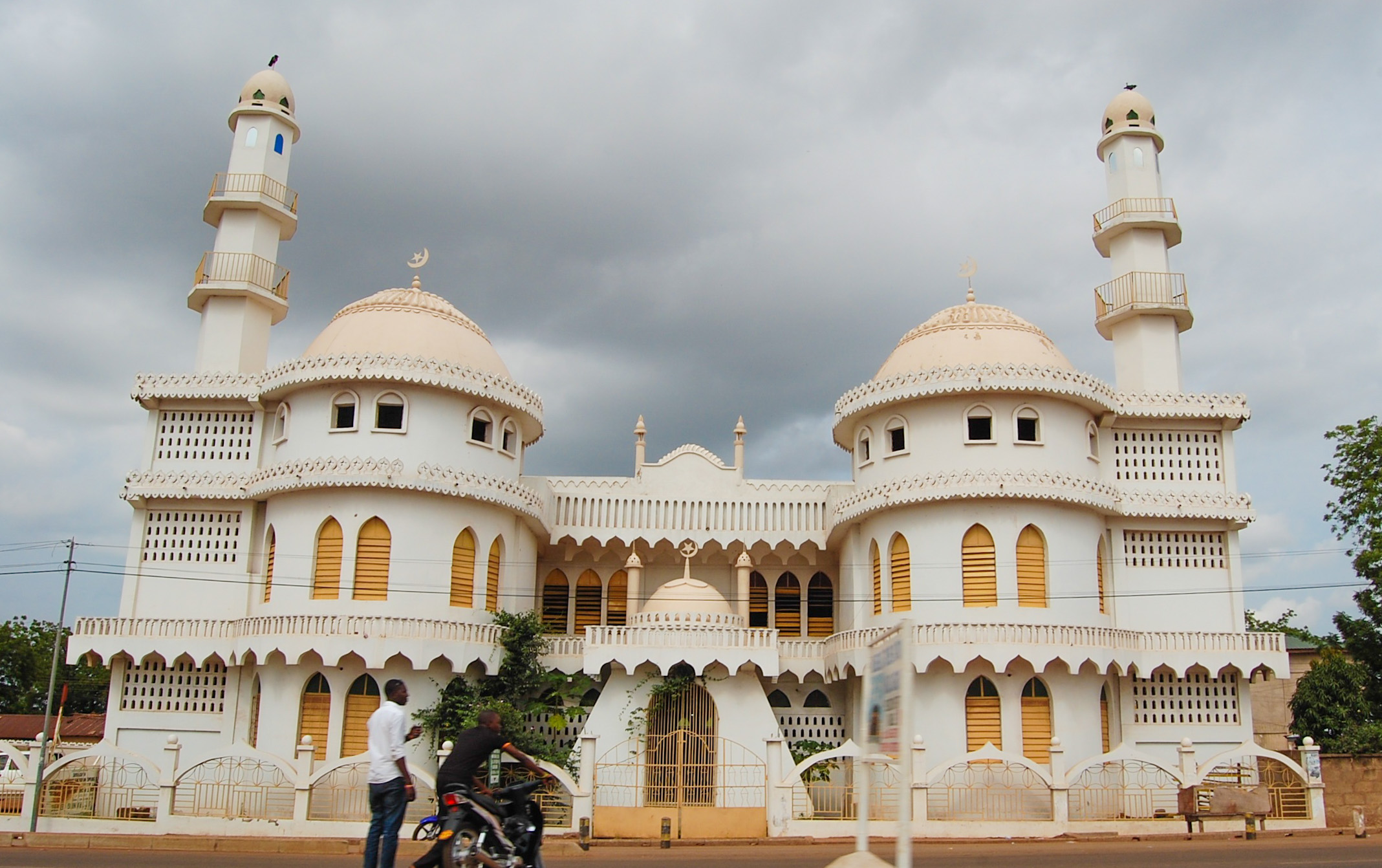
The Ahmadiyya Central Mosque, Tamale, in the Dagbon Kingdom

The Ahmadiyya Muslim community is the second largest group of Islam in Ghana after Sunni Islam. The early rise of the community in Ghana can be traced through a sequence of events beginning roughly at the same time as the birth of the Ahmadiyya movement in 1889 in British India. It was during the early period of the Second Caliphate that the first missionary, Abdul Rahim Nayyar was sent to what was then the Crown colony of Gold Coast in 1921 upon invitation from Sunni Muslims in Saltpond. Having established the movement in the country, Nayyar left and was replaced by the first permanent missionary, Al Hajj Fadl-ul-Rahman Hakim in 1922.

The Pew Research Center estimates the total number of Ahmadis in Ghana at 635,000 people, representing roughly 16.5% of Ghana's Muslim population, and roughly 2.5% of Ghana's population as a whole. The estimate is disputed due to the alleged undercounting of Muslims in Ghana (including Ahmadis), the Ahmadiyya Muslim Community estimates a population of two million Ghanaian Ahmadis. (Note: Ghana's Muslims have previously raised concern over the census figures which states that 17% of Ghanaians belong to the Muslim faith. It is claimed that Muslims represent somewhere between 30 and 45% of Ghana. Under this, the Ahmadiyya population would number almost 2 million. The Ahmadiyya Muslim Community itself gives an estimate of over 2 million Ahmadis in Ghana. See: "Muslims cry foul over population figures". News From Africa. Retrieved April 30, 2014. (ref 8); Ahmadiyya Muslim Mosques around the World. p. 70 (ref 11))

== History ==
=== Establishment ===
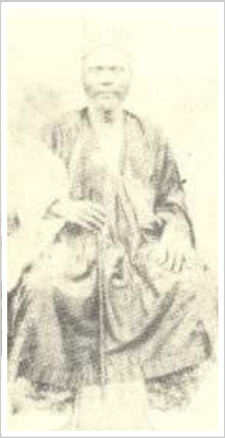
Aduogyir "Mahdi" Appah in his later years

The introduction of the Ahmadiyya Muslim Community in Ghana can be traced to a sequence of events, commencing several years prior to the establishment of the Community in 1889 in British India. Although, there were reports of small number of Muslims in southern Ghana in the early 19th century, Islam is said to have properly commenced in the region in 1885, among the Fante people. Roughly a decade prior to this, in 1872, during perhaps the third Anglo-Ashanti war, a northern Muslim cleric Abu Bakr arrived in southern Ghana to administer the spiritual needs of Muslim Nigerian Hausa soldiers brought by the British colonialists. In 1885, he converted two people who are regarded as the founding fathers of Islam among the Fante people; namely Benjamin Sam and Mahdi Appah. (Note: The birth name of Mahdi Appah was Aduogyir Appah. After converting to the Ahmadiyya movement, he changed his first name to Mahdi. See: Acquah 2011, p. 166) Both were formerly Christians. Sam was a Methodist evangelist and a trader who initially brought his friend Appah from Paganism to Christianity. The conversion of Sam is said to have been influenced through a vision and of Appah as a consequence of the fulfilment of his prayer.

Islam grew rapidly among the Fante people. Starting from Ekrofol, Sam self-designated himself as its Imam, and quickly built a community of 500 Fante Muslims across southern Ghana. At times, Muslim clerics from the northern regions continued to supervise the growing, but nascent group of Muslims in southern Ghana. In July 1896, a secular Muslim school was opened in Ekrofol, and Appah was appointed as its manager. However, the northern clerics expressed strong disapproval of a secular-leaning school. Despite this, the school prospered with governmental assistance until 1908 when it was infected by Guinea worm disease and attendance soon dropped. As a convert from Christianity, Sam taught customs, brought from Christianity, that were sometimes considered un-Islamic. This was a major cause of disagreement between him and his friend Appah. As a result, Appah left Ekrofol. Sam died soon after, in the same year the disease struck the school. Appah once again returned to Ekrofol and continued to propagate Islam among the Fante people.

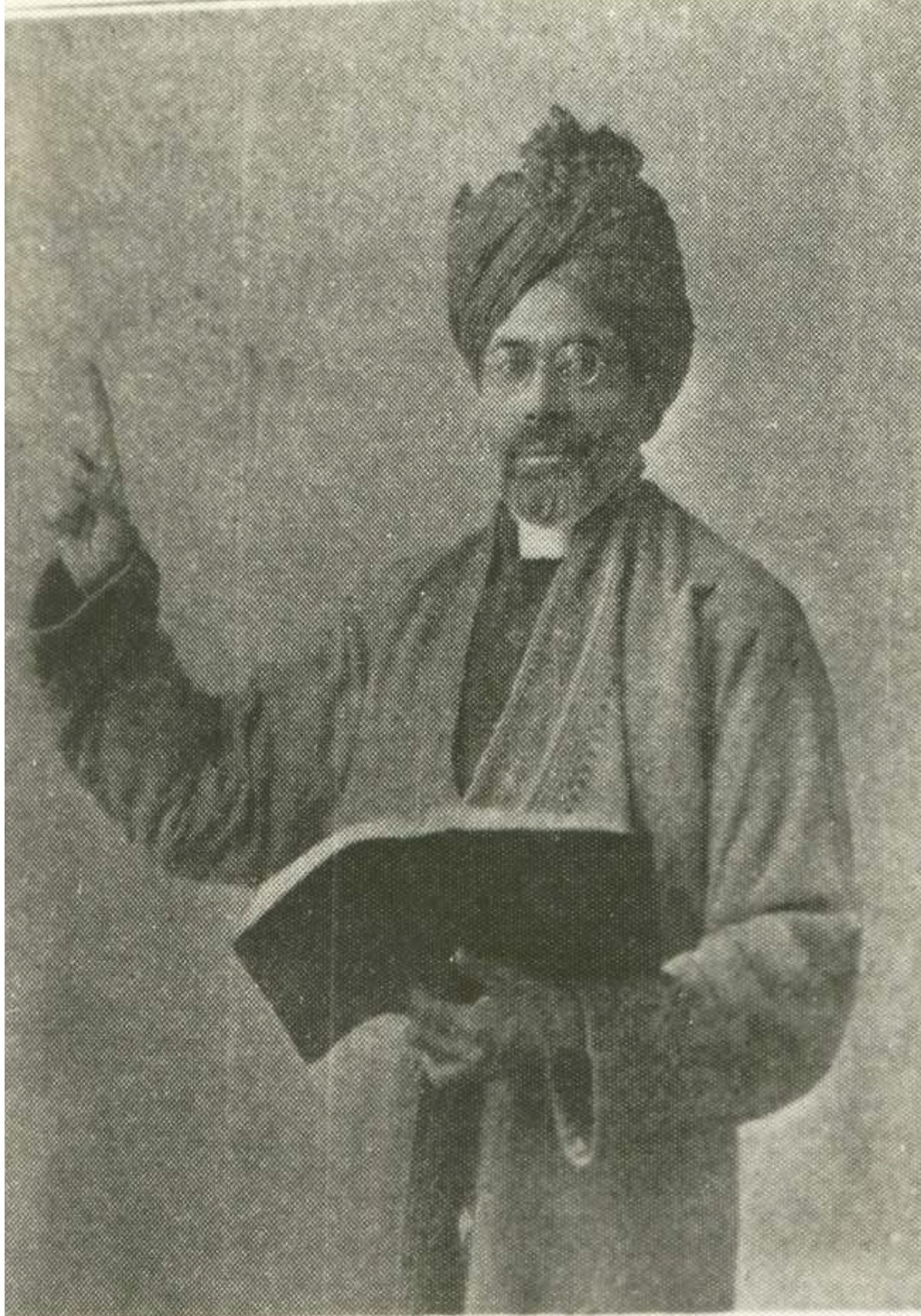
Abdul Rahim Nayyar, the first Ahmadi Muslim missionary to be sent to the Gold Coast, modern-day Ghana, was responsible for establishing the movement in the country.

The first contact with Ahmadiyya in Ghana can perhaps be attributed to a consequence of Sam's cousin who dreamt of white men called "Muslims", with whom he was praying. (Note: The term "white" corresponded to non-African foreigners. Thus, Ahmadi Muslims from the Indian subcontinent were counted among the "whites". Before the invitation, the young group of orthodox Muslims were not aware of the existence of "white" Muslims. See: Antoine 2010, p. 3; Antoine 2010, p. 77) It was believed by converts that the only people who prayed as Muslims were the northern Hausa. However, a resident in Saltpond, originally from Nigeria, informed the presence of the Indian-origin Ahmadiyya movement in Nigeria. Soon, through the Review of Religions, the Fante Muslims under the leadership of Appah made contact with the caliph, Mirza Bashir-ud-Din Mahmud Ahmad, in Qadian, India. The Muslims were no longer interested to remain under the spiritual guidance of the northern Ghanaians or Hausa Muslims. The caliph sent Al-Hajj Abdul Rahim Nayyar who sailed from London to Freetown, in Sierra Leone. After a short stay he arrived on 28 February 1921 to Saltpond, Ghana.and started preaching in the first week of March 1921. Following a lecture, the Fante community "believed there and then", following which an oath of allegiance was held. In the history of the Ahmadiyya Muslim Community, Mahdi Appah is regarded as the first Ghanaian to become an Ahmadi Muslim. Despite resistance from northern clerics, the Fante Muslims converted en masse, giving immediate rise to the Ahmadiyya movement in Ghana.

Having established the Ahmadiyya movement in Ghana, Nayyar left within a month for Lagos, in Nigeria, before returning again in fall of 1921. Nayyar left the colony once again in 1922 and was replaced by Al Hajj Fadl-ul-Rahman Hakim, as the first permanent missionary to Ghana. In 1923, Hakim started an elementary school in Saltpond. Further primary schools were opened in a number of other towns and villages, such as in Mumford and Potsin, all in the coastal regions. By 1927, the Community numbered 3,000 across forty localities in the southern regions and the Ashanti Empire. In 1927, an increased missionary outlook was adopted, which facilitated its spread among the Fante people in the south, the Wala people in the north, and the Ashanti people in between. In 1929, Hakim left the colony, only to return again in 1933, for another two years. According to Samwini, the rapid expansion posed a threat to the very existence of Christianity and the Sunni order in the country.

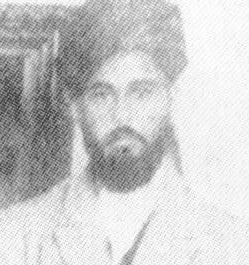
Al Hajj Fadl-ul-Rahman Hakim was the first permanent Ahmadi Muslim missionary in the Gold Coast.

=== Early twentieth century ===
Leading up to the 1950s, the presence of the Ahmadiyya movement was strongly felt throughout modern Ghana, stretching from the coastal towns, through to Kumasi, and up to Wa in the Upper West region and also among the Dagbon regions in the northeast.

For the first decade, the Ahmadiyya mission had only a single missionary at any one time, supported by a Fante interpreter. During the 1920s, Hakim conducted open-air lectures across notable locations along the southern coast. In his efforts he adopted the Quran and the Bible. Many of these discussions revolved around the death of Jesus, a perspective at odds with the non-Ahmadi Muslim and Christian populations of Ghana. Titles included "The Bible Shows Jesus did not die on the cross" and "Jesus did not die on the cross, nor is he sitting alive in the fourth heaven at the right hand of God." Such polemics, on the one hand, were a cause of confusion for the Christian peasants in the southern regions and on the other hand created a negative relationship between Hakim and some Christians. In some cases, polemics induced intra-religious violence directed towards Ahmadis.

From the very beginning, the Ahmadiyya movement adopted Western-style education system and at the same time advocated for Islamic curriculum. In 1928, the Community requested the colonial government for permission to build a mosque and a secondary school in Kumasi. However, the government rejected the application, on the basis that there already existed a Muslim mosque and a school in the region. The following year, another letter was sent with over 400 signatures from Asante members of the Community. With small number of Muslims being admitted to public schools, the Community petitioned the government, in 1931, to select Muslim members for the government's board of education. Another letter was written in 1946 to the Chief Commission of Ashanti, arguing that most rights and privileges are being afforded to Christians. It was not until 1950 that the colonial government first gave permission to establish an Ahmadiyya school in the Ashanti Empire. The T.I. Ahmadiyya Senior High School in Kumasi was founded on January 50, 1950.

As a consequence of the Community's missionary efforts, its claim towards its representation of Islam, and perhaps also because of its cooperation with the reigning colonial administration, the Community faced intolerance from certain locals and religious leaders, particularly by the Wala clerics who sometimes adopted a confrontational attitude towards the Ahmadi Muslims.

In 1932, a Suwarian religious scholar, Salih bin Hassan, originally from Wa, was teaching in Amumoso, a village, roughly nine miles from Kumasi. He inadvertently confronted a crowd of people gathered around a preacher, Nazir Ahmad Ali, who was to later become a pioneering missionary in Sierra Leone. Whilst Ali was preaching, a chief requested Salih to judge the message brought by Ali. With the exception of two things, which "held his throat", Salih found that the message coincided with the teachings of the Quran. He debated Ali on certain issues, but, a month later, he went to Saltpond to join the Ahmadiyya movement himself. Afterwards, he returned to his business, converting a number of his students and six of his Wala trade partners. In the same year, in 1932, Salih sent three of his colleagues to Wa, perhaps on a preaching mission. In June, the three were summoned to the ruler of Wa, Wa Na Pelpuo, and the chief Imam, Wa Limam Muhammad bin Uthman Dun. The Wala leaders expelled the Ahmadis from Wa, on hearing their views. In 1934, Salih himself attempted to introduce the Ahmadiyya teachings in the town. In response, restrictions were placed on him and his family; he was not permitted to leave his house and his family was placed under surveillance. However Salih managed to escape. It was not until 1936, that he returned to Wa, and as a consequence, the Ahmadiyya presence was strengthened but, on the other hand, Wa became a divided town, with little relationship between Wala's members of Sunni and Ahmadi faiths. Nevertheless, Salih's success in Wa led to his appointment as a preacher and a missionary for the entirety of Ahmadiyya in Ghana.

The presence of the Ahmadiyya movement in Wa exasperated the Sunni Muslims of Wa to the extent that in the 1940s, the district commissioner began to negotiate with the missionary in-charge of Ghana, Maulvi Nazir Mobashir, the relocation of the Wala Ahmadis. Mobashir accepted the relocation, under certain conditions. However, Salih interjected and refused the offer and the plan did not go ahead. In 1949, Wala tradition appointed Mumuni Koray, a 1929 Ahmadi convert, as the Wa Na, the ruler of the Wa. Three years later, in 1951, Koray rejected Wa Limam Alhaj Sa’id Soribo, a Sunni Muslim, and instead appointed Salih as the Wa Limam, the chief Imam of the Wala people. This further agitated the Wala Sunni Muslims. However, Koray died in 1953, and the office reverted to a Sunni ruler. Two years later, Salih was removed from the Imamate.

In a separate development, in the year 1939, through Salih's efforts a mission house was established outside Tamale in Dagbon, within the northern regions. The Ahmadis particularly targeted the Muslim populations in their preaching efforts. They engaged in debates with the Sunni Muslims and the Tijaniyyah Muslims to the extent that the Tamale's Muslims felt that their faith was threatened. As a consequence, a highly antagonistic position was adopted whereby the Ahmadi preachers were chased and stoned out of the town whenever the missionaries attempted to preach in the town. In comparison to the Ahmadiyya missions in Wa, the Ahmadis had little influence in Tamale in the early decades of its presence.

=== Late twentieth century ===
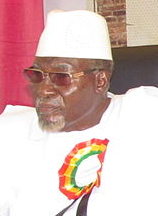
Abdul Wahab Adam was the head and missionary-in-charge of the Ahmadiyya movement in Ghana, until his death in 2014. Muhammad bin Salih is the current head of the movement.

On August 10, 1974, Abdul Wahab Adam was appointed as the Amir (Head) and missionary-in-charge of the Ahmadiyya Muslim Mission of Ghana by the then caliph of the Ahmadiyya movement, Mirza Nasir Ahmad. Adam was the first indigenous Ghanaian to hold this office. In the early part of his ministry, Adam shifted the headquarters of the Ghanaian Ahmadiyya Muslim Community from Saltpond to the capital of the country, Accra. The move came in response to Accra's growing economic and political influence in the country, which strongly contrasts with Saltpond, a small unknown town in coastal Ghana.

During the late twentieth century, the Ahmadi missionaries increasingly diverted their attention towards the Christian populations of the country. A large number of books, fliers and audio cassettes were published to meet the new objective. Articles published and public preaching sessions included titles such as, "Jesus Will not Come Again", "Jesus:Son of God or God?" and "50,000 errors in the Bible". Perhaps as a result of this, the Ahmadi Muslim teachings, and particularly its eschatological doctrines have been the most difficult theological challenge the Ghanaian Christians may have encountered since the late twentieth century. The Ahmadi Muslim missionaries, often seen as successful preachers by some locals, who adopt the Bible and Quran in their preaching efforts, have resulted in many Christian evangelists to adopt the two books as well. Another notable consequence is that, since 1964, the Christian denominations in Ghana have come to increasingly recognize the presence of Muslims as important and noticeable members of the Ghanaian society.

The Ahmadiyya Muslim Community significantly increased its social and humanitarian efforts in Ghana. Perhaps the most decisive was the visit to the Gambia by the then Caliph Mirza Nasir Ahmad, whose visit in 1970 was instrumental in the launch of the Nusrat Jahan Scheme which has been responsible for the establishment of a number of schools and hospitals all over West Africa. It has also been argued that besides the Nusrat Jahan Scheme, local missionaries and leaders boosted their efforts in humanitarian activities as well, to "restore the glory of Islam." While opening the fourth Ahmadiyya hospital in the country in 1971, at Agona Swedru, Central Region, Basharat Ahmad Bashir, a leading Ahmadiyya missionary stated that, "opening hospitals and educational facilities in the country was part of the programme of the Movement to regain the lost heritage and glory of Islam."

== Demographics ==
By 1927, Ahmadi Muslims were estimated to number 3,000 across the southern regions of Ghana. In comparison, among the northern regions, the city of Wa had roughly 100 Ahmadi Muslim, within five years of its existence. By 1948, Ahmadis were estimated to number over 22,000 and in the 1960 census Ahmadi Muslims were estimated at 175,620. According to Samwini, by the year 2000, the Ahmadiyya movement placed "itself and Islam in a centrally prominent position in Ghana". In 2010, Pew Research Center estimated Ahmadi Muslims at 16 percent of Ghana's Muslims, thereby representing the largest proportion of Ahmadis to Muslims in any known country. Taking into account census figures for the Muslim population, this corresponds to roughly 635,000 Ahmadi Muslims. However, the Coalition of Muslim Organizations maintain that the final census figures "contained serious flaws and as a result could not be used as reliable data for planning and projecting the country’s development agenda." Some estimates place Muslim population at over twice the figure presented by the census, which can give a corresponding Ahmadi population figure of almost 2 million.

During the first decade of the Ahmadiyya movement in modern-day Ghana, the Ahmadiyya mission had only a single Indian missionary at any one time, supported by a Fante interpreter. By 1946, there were up to three Indian missionaries and five West African missionaries, and four teachers in the country. After almost 15 years, by 1961, there were 21 West African missionaries, and only four foreign ones.

== Modern community ==
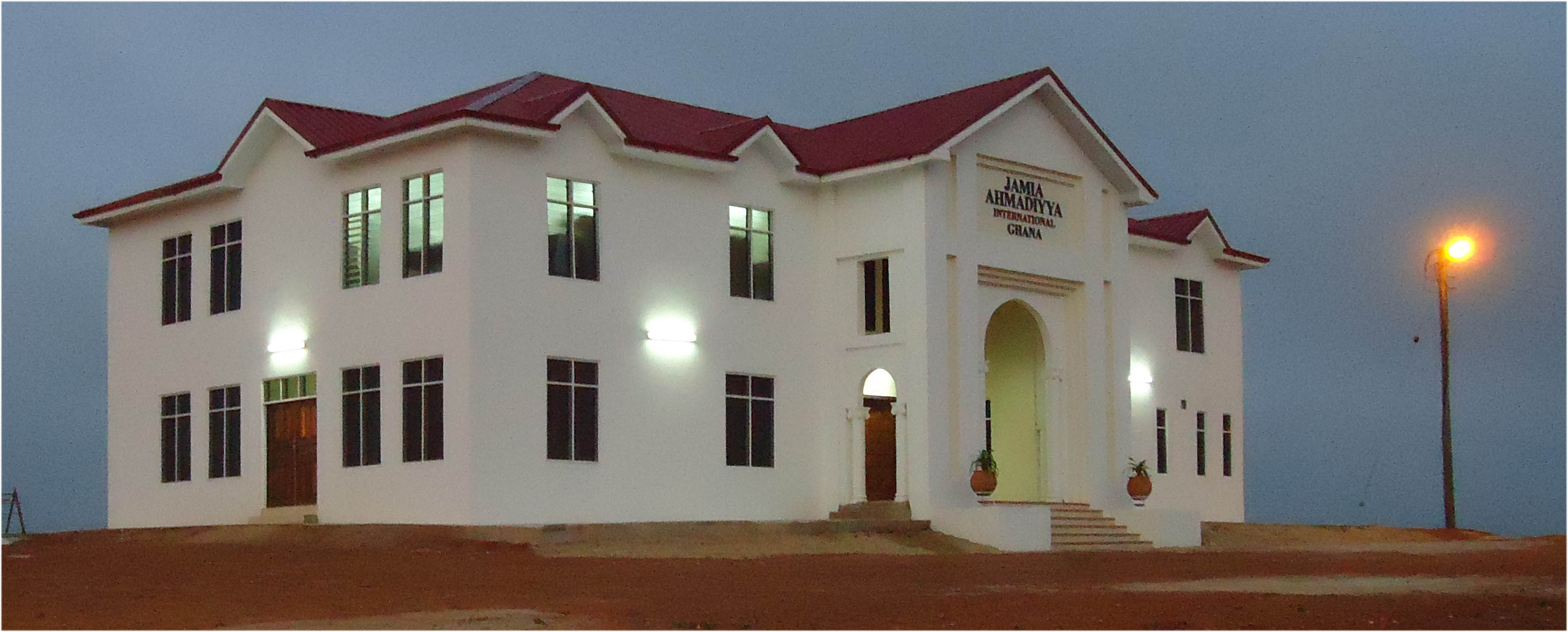
The Ghanaian campus of Ahmadiyya University of Theology and Languages in Mankessim, near Saltpond.

By 1961, there were 161 mosques and over 20 schools in Ghana. Today, the Ahmadiyya movement maintains a large number of schools, colleges and health facilities across Ghana. There are also a large number of Ahmadi mosques, including one missionary training college in Mankessim, near Saltpond, in the Central Region. A significant number the Muslims who hold prominent offices in politics, civil service, academia, and education in the country, are Ahmadi Muslims.

Unlike a number of Muslim-majority countries where the hostile attitude towards Ahmadi Muslims generates a negative relationship with the Sunni Muslims, there exists a level of cooperation between the two sects in Ghana. The national Hilal Committee comprises members from the Office of the Chief Imam of Ghana as well as leading figures of the Ahmadiyya Muslim Mission, Ghana. The date for Ramadhan is set upon a joint declaration by the Chief Imam and the Head of the Ahmadiyya Muslim Mission. However, due to various theological reasons, the two groups do not pray in congregation with each other.

== See also ==
- Islam in Ghana
