= Amidu Issahaku Chinnia =

Ghanaian politician

Hon Amidu Issahaku Chinnia
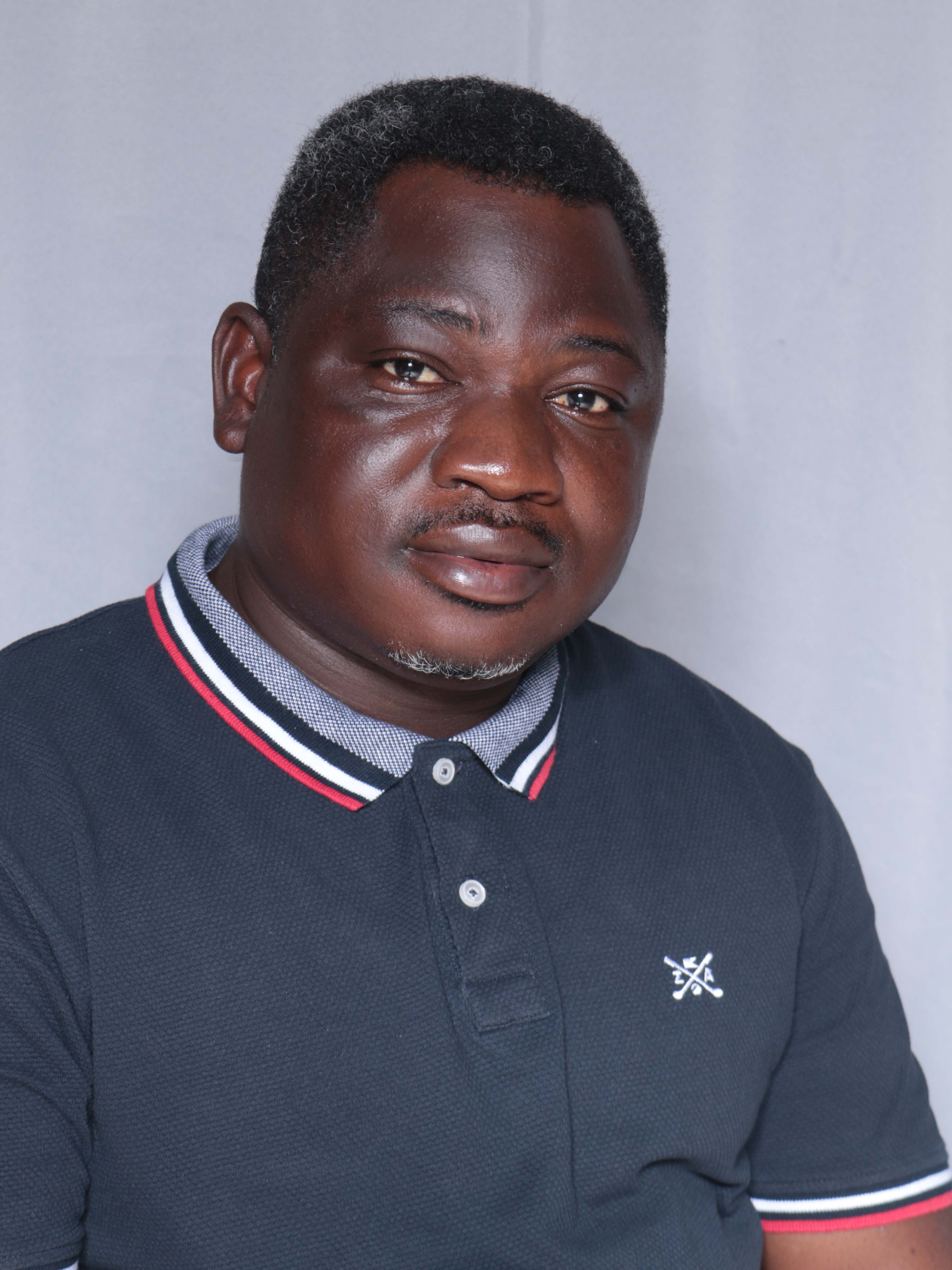

Member of the Ghana Parliament for Sissala East
- Incumbent
- Assumed office 7 January 2021

Personal details
- Born: Amidu Issahaku Chinnia; 20 May 1978 (age 48) Bugubelle
- Party: New Patriotic Party
- Education: Nusrat Jahan Ahmadiyya College of Education
- Occupation: Politician
- Committees: Public Accounts Committee, Environment, Science and Technology Committee

Amidu Issahaku Chinnia (born 20 May 1978) is a Ghanaian politician and member of the New Patriotic Party. He is the former member of parliament for the Sissala East Constituency, Upper West Region and also the Deputy Regional Minister.

== Early life and education ==
Amidu hails from Bugubelle in the Upper West Region of Ghana. He attended Tumu Secondary Technical School and continued to Nusrat Jahan Ahmadiyya College of Education in Wa to be trained as a professional teacher. He holds an MPhil in Agriculture (Horticulture).

He is married with one wife and three children.

== Personal life ==
Amidu Issahaku Chinnia is a Muslim.
