= Shamima Muslim =

Ghanaian broadcast journalist and gender advocate

Shamima Muslim is a Ghanaian broadcast journalist, development communication specialist, and gender advocate. She is known for her work in media, governance communication, and the promotion of women's participation in journalism and leadership. She currently serves as Deputy Presidential Spokesperson in the communications team of John Dramani Mahama.

== Personal life ==
Shamima Muslim is originally from the Upper West Region of Ghana and belongs to the Wala ethnic group. She has spoken publicly about her experiences as a Muslim woman in media and leadership and has encouraged young women to pursue careers in journalism,governance and public service.

== Early life and education ==
Shamima Muslim had her secondary education in Ghana before pursuing tertiary education in communication and development studies. She obtained a Bachelor’s degree in Communications Studies from the Ghana Institute of Journalism. She later earned a Master’s degree in Development Management from the Ghana Institute of Management and Public Administration.

== Career ==
Shamima Muslim began her career as a broadcast journalist and media presenter. She became widely known through her work with Citi FM and Metro TV Ghana, where she hosted current affairs programs and moderated discussions on governance, public policy and national development.

She has moderated and participated in several national policy dialogues and public debates in Ghana, contributing to discussions on governance, gender equality and social development.

She is the founder of the Alliance for Women in Media Africa, an organization established to promote gender equality and increase the visibility and professional advancement of women in the media industry across Africa.

In addition to her work in journalism, she has worked as a development communication specialist and policy advocate on governance, media development and gender issues.

== Advocacy and initiatives ==
Through the Alliance for Women in Media Africa, Shamima Muslim has promoted professional development opportunities, mentorship programs and leadership training for women journalists across Africa.

Shamima Muslim was one of two Ghanaian activists invited to introduce Kamala Harris during her address to young people from across Africa at Black Star Square in March 2023.

She is also a pioneering 2010 alumnus of the Young African Leaders Initiative, a leadership program established by Barack Obama to support emerging African leaders.
