= Dumba Festival =

Festival in Ghana by the people of Wa

Dumba Festival is an annual festival celebrated by the chiefs and people of Wa of the Wala Paramouncy in the Upper West Region of Ghana. It is usually celebrated in the month of September or October.

== Celebrations ==
During the festival, visitors are welcomed to share food and drinks. The people put on traditional clothes and there is durbar of chiefs. There is also dancing and drumming.

== Significance ==
This festival is celebrated to mark an event that took place in the past. This festival serves as an occasion for the people in the area to unite and renew their commitment to the Islamic religion. It is also claimed the Wa Naa life is prolonged if he is able to jump over a tethered cow successfully. The fitness of the chief is assessed as to whether he can continue to rule the people. The body or clothes of the chief must not touch the cow. In case the chief fails, it is said to be a bad omen that he is weak and should not continue to rule.
