= Notes on Afghanistan and Baluchistan =

1881 book by Henry George Raverty

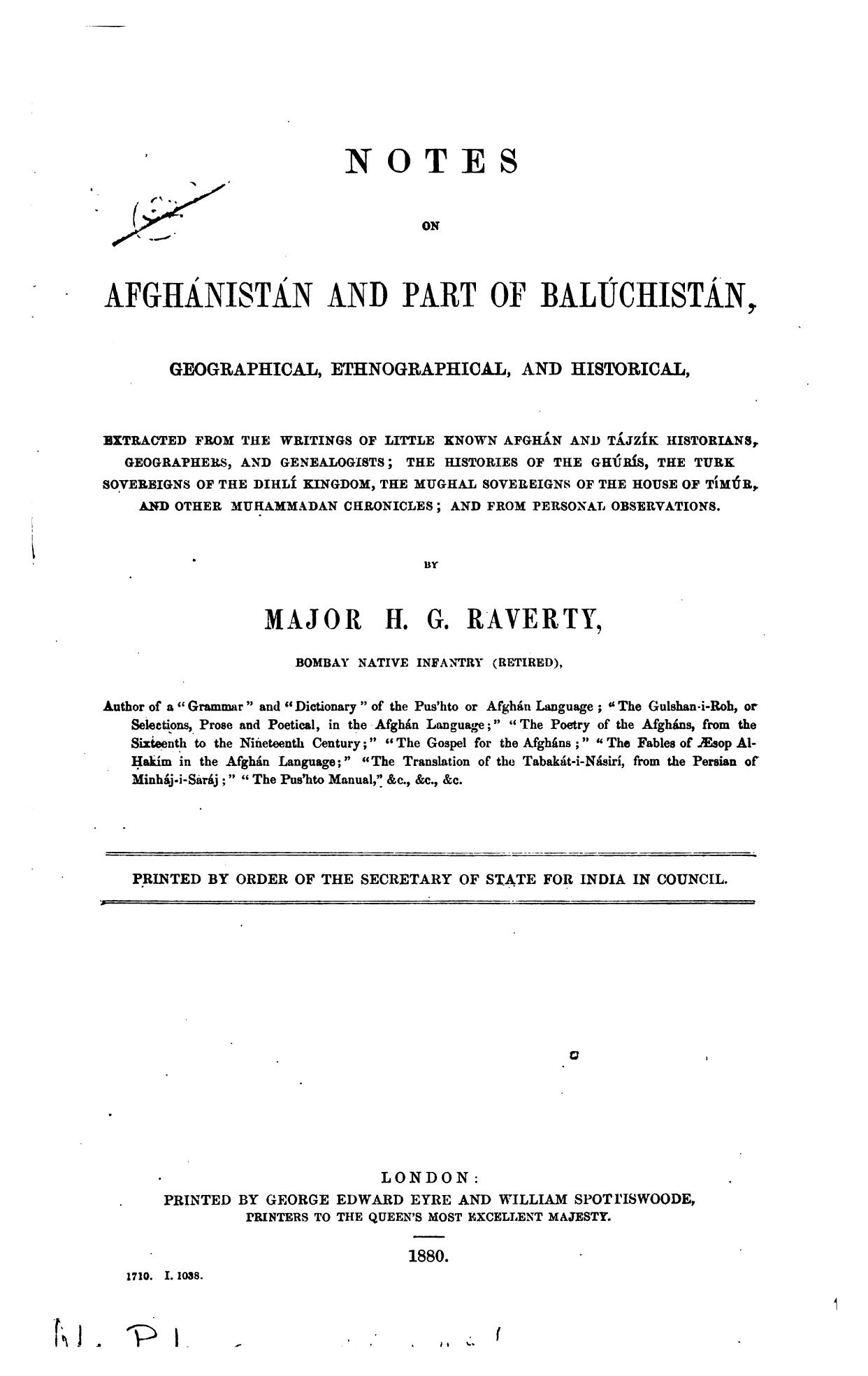
- Title page for Notes on Afghanistan and Baluchistan (1881)
- Author: Henry George Raverty
- Publication date: 1881

Notes on Afghánistan and Part of Balúchistán: Geographical, Ethnographical ... is a book by Major Henry George Raverty. The work was published in four installments between 1881 and 1888. The first Pakistani edition was published in 1978.

The book is an account and history of the tribal areas in the North-West Frontier Province of Pakistan and in Balochistan, Afghanistan.
