= Wa Technical University =

Public higher-education institution in Ghana

- Other names: WTU
- Former names: Wa Polytechnic
- Type: Technical University
- Established: 1999; 27 years ago
- Vice-Chancellor: Prof Baba Insah
- Location: Wa, Ghana; 10°00′49″N 2°30′45″W
- Campus: Main Campus
- Website: wapoly.edu.gh

The Wa Technical University (formerly Wa Polytechnic) is a public tertiary institution in the Upper West Region of Ghana.

Program run are:

- Pharmacy technology / dispensing technology
- Agricultural engineering
- Mechanical engineering
- Building technology / estate management
- Industrial arts
- Civil engineering
- Information communication technology
- Accountancy
- Banking and finance
- Purchasing and supply

== Graduation ==
The university held its first ever graduation ceremony on 14 November 2020.

== Vice Chancellors ==
- Vice Chancellor, Prof Baba Insah - 2020 to present

== See also ==
- List of universities in Ghana
- Education in Ghana
