= Wa Naa's Palace =

Palace in Wa, Upper West Region of Ghana

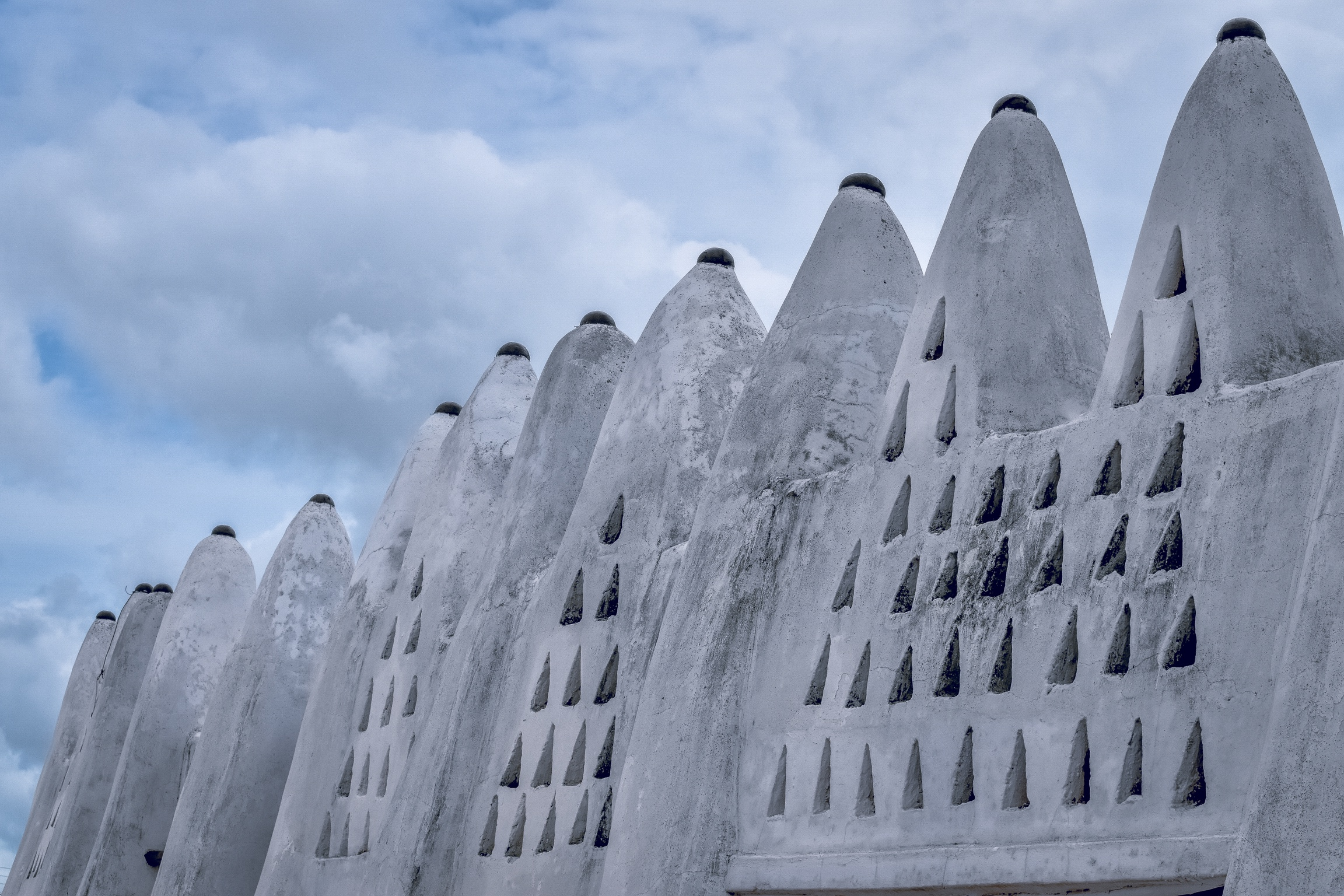
- Palace pillars

General information
- Architectural style: Sudano-Sahelian architecture
- Location: Wa, Ghana
- Coordinates: 10°03′49″N 2°30′02″W

Wa Naa's Palace is the home to the King of the Wala people who are said to be the majority in Wa in the Upper West Region of Ghana. It is located in the heart of the town and the home to the entire family, palace staff and officials of the kingdom. It is the place for cultural, political, religious and social importance for the local people. In the palace, the chief sits on either a skin of a lion or antelope where as others sit on the skin of a cow or sheep.

== Features ==
The building is made from traditional mud-brick Sudano-Sahelian architecture. The architectural style is a combination of forms and influences from the Moorish architecture and Sahel-Sudan according to some sources. It is claimed that few historic earthen buildings of this nature remained in the Upper West region because of inadequate skilled artisans that are needed to maintain the building.

== History ==
Historians claim the people of Wa migrated from Sudan in the northern part of Africa. They were mostly nomadic people and they traveled for miles to feed their livestock. After they settled in their present land, they installed a king and led to the creation of Wa Naa Title with Wa Naa as the supreme leader of the people. It is claimed in the 19th century, the building was built using sundried mud-brick walls and Y-shaped wooden columns to support the flat roofs of a bush-pole framework covered with mud. The place was built to prevent enemy attacks and contained weapons if they were ever attacked. It is also known to be the grave site for former kings who are buried in front of the palace.

== Partnership ==
In 2009, the World Monuments Fund collaborated with the Ghana Museums and Monuments Board to ponder on means on how to preserve the Y-shaped structure. It was claimed to be one of the 'finest' and last remains of ancient architectural buildings that has to be preserved. This project was completed in 2012.
