= SD Dombo University of Business and Integrated Development Studies =

Public university in Wa, Upper West Region of Ghana

University of Business and Integrated Development Studies
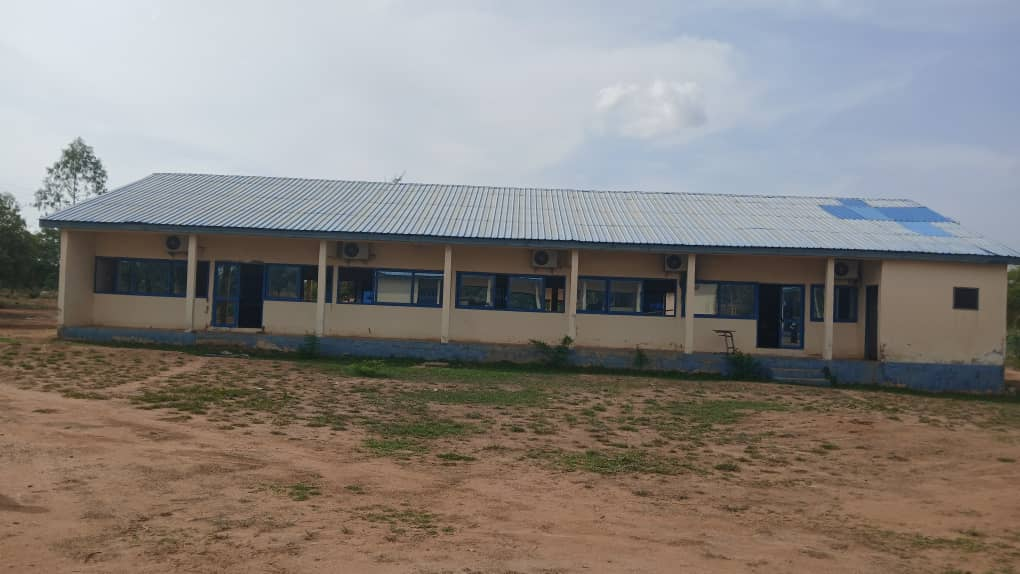
- Type: Public university
- Established: 1994
- Location: Wa, Upper West Region, Ghana
- Website: https://ubids.edu.gh/

University of Business and Integrated Development Studies (UBIDS) is a public university located in Wa Upper West Region of Ghana. The university was originally the Wa Campus of the University for Development Studies and the government made this campus into its own autonomous university. The university was established in 2019 under Act 1001 of the Parliament of the Republic of Ghana. It was established to provide opportunities for the people in the Upper West Region to access university education. In 2025 it was renamed, having previously been known as the Simon Diedong Dombo University.

== History ==
University of Business and Integrated Development Studies emerged from the UDS-Wa Campus through its Faculty of Integrated Development Studies (FIDS) established in 1994 which was formally known as University for Development Studies, Wa, Upper West and subsequently changed to Simon Diedong Dombo University of Business and Integrated Development Studies. The university was officially opened for operation in May 2020. The name of the university honors Simon [Simon Diedong Dombo Diedong Dombo], a Ghanaian politician, teacher, and King who was a Member of Parliament in the first and second Parliament of Ghana.

== Campuses ==
- Main Campus — Bamahu
- Old Campus - Sombo around Fire service Station

== Faculties and schools ==
=== Faculty of Integrated Development Studies (FIDS) ===
- Department of African and Endogenous studies
- Department of Development Studies
- Department of Environment and Resources Studies
- Department of Communication Studies

=== Faculty of Planning and Land Management (FPLM) ===
- Department of Planning
- Department of Community Development
- Department of Real Estate and Land Management
- Department of Urban Design and Infrastructure Development
- Department of Land management
- Department of Construction Studies

=== Faculty of Education and Life-Long Studies ===
- Department of Social Science Education
- Department of Business Education (DBE)
- Department of Foundation Studies (DFS)

=== School of Business (SoB) ===
- Department of Management Studies
- Department of Banking and Finance
- Department of Marketing Entrepreneurship
- Department of Hospitality and Tourism Management
- Department of Accounting
- Department of Health Services Management and Administration
- Department of Procurement and Supply Chain Management

=== Faculty of Social Science and Arts (FSSA) ===
- Department of Economics
- Department of Sociology and Social Work
- Department of Geography
- Department of History and Political studies
- Department of Modern Languages and Diasporan Studies
- Department of Applied Statistics

=== Faculty of Information and Communication Technology (FICT) ===
- Department of Informatics
- Department of Computer Science

=== School of Law ===
- Department of Public Law
- Department of Private Law
- Department of International Law
