= Abdullah Saeed (general) =

Pakistani general

- Died: 1988
- Military career
- Allegiance: Pakistan
- Rank: Major General
- Commands: Pakistan Military Academy
- Other work: Chief Martial Law Administrator for Baluchistan

Abdullah Saeed was a Pakistani general who served as Commandant of the Pakistan Military Academy at Kakul, Chief Martial Law Administrator for Baluchistan when Zia overthrew Bhutto and later Pakistan's ambassador to Mexico, Costa Rica, Panama, Venezuela and Cuba under Zia-ul-Haq.

== Early career ==
Saeed started his career in 6 Frontier Force (FF) Regiment after he graduated the Pakistan Military Academy (PMA) course in 1948.

== Personal life ==
He was born in Abbottabad in the northern Hazara region of the Khyber Pakhtunkhwa province. He was the son of Lahore Ahmadiyya Movement Emir Saeed Ahmad Khan and died in 1988 of colon cancer. Zia-ul-Haq personally went and offered condolences to his family in Lahore.
