= Mirza Muhammad Ismail =

Mirza Muhammad Ismail Qandahari (c 1813–1912), usually known as Mirza Muhammad Ismail, was an Afghan religious scholar and the first convert to the Ahmadiyya faith among the Pashtons of the North West Frontier Province of India.

He was an ethnic Turk, born about 1813 at Qandahar, Afghanistan. His father was a Qazi in the city of Qandahar, as well as being a some-time minister during the reign of Shah Shujah Durrani (1785-1842), King of Afghanistan. He was a scholar of Arabic, Persian and Pashto, a good poet and a calligrapher.

He was a Pashto and Persian teacher to Captain (later Major) Henry George Raverty (1825-1906), assisting him in many of his works on the Pashto language. He converted to Ahmadiyya Islam in response to a vision in 1887.

Ismail died on September 18, 1912, at Peshawar.

== Early life ==
Ismail was born in the house of a renowned religious scholar, a Qazi, in the city of Qandahar.

Raised speaking Pashto, he became a scholar of Arabic, Persian and his native language, as well as being an Islamic jurist who was able to assist his father in his profession as a Qazi. According to his biographer, Qazi Muhammad Yousaf, he never married

He had an interest in Pashto and Persian poetry, writing his own poetry. Henry George Raverty mentioned his skill as both a poet and scholar.

== Migration to India ==
At the age of 32, Ismail left Afghanistan and traveled to India. Leaving Qandahar, he passed through Chaman, Pashin, Quetta, Sibi, Shikarpur and Sind. He stayed in these places and continued his intellectual pursuits. Qazi Muhammad Yousaf has recorded his discussion of Shia and Sunni differences with a scholar at Shikarpur. He ended his journey in Bombay, where he was appointed tutor in Pashto and Persian to Captain Henry George Raverty of the 3rd Bombay Native Infantry, accompanying him on military campaigns, and ending up in Peshawar in 1852.

== Tutor to H G Raverty ==
Henry George Raverty makes clear reference to Ismail's contribution to his various works. In the introduction to Raverty's 'Dictionary of the Pashto Language' he writes:

"“During the whole time I had the valuable assistance of a Molawi of the Ghalzi tribe, located in central Afghanistan in the District around Khelat-iGhalzi, and whose father was for some time Kazi of the city of Kandahar, in which office the Molawi, who is better acquainted with Pashto both theoretically and practically, than any other man I ever saw or heard of, assisted. His profound knowledge of Arabic—the foundation of all Muhammadan languages—and without which the situation of Kazi, in the western Capital of Afghanistan, could not have been held, together with the fact of his possessing no mean poetical powers, rendered him peculiarly fitted for a task of this kind, in which many works had to be examined and collated.”

A similar comment about Ismail is found in Raverty's 'Preface' to the Grammar of the Afghan language, Pakhtu.

== Educational Services ==
In 1852, Mirza Muhammad Ismail was appointed District Inspector of Schools in the Peshawar and Hazara districts to look after the newly established schooling system in this region. He served in this position until his retirement in 1884. He travelled widely in the region to inspect schools in the villages of the North West Frontier.

Molvi Muhammad Ismail made a contribution to Pashto literature and to the learning of Pashto as a foreign language, publishing handbooks such as Pashto Tutor, Khazana-i-Afghani, Sawal-o-Jawa and Pushto Guide. Tariq Rahman writes:

"One of the first such books was Tutor to Pushto and it was published in 1896 by Moulvi Ismail Khan as ‘a perfect help to the lower and higher standard Pashto examination’ (Khan 1896). Khan, Ismail. 1896. Tutor to Pushto: With English, Urdu and Persian Translation and Pronunciation in Roman...."

While in Peshawar, Ismail was requested by T.P. Hughes and Worthington Jukes to translate parts of the Bible into Pashto. This translation work assisted his understanding the works of Mirza Ghulam Ahmad and his claims.

== Religious experiences ==
In 1887, he had a vision, which he reported to Qazi Muhammad Yousaf.

I was sitting on my prayer mat, after offering the Nimaz e Tahajjud [Midnight Prayers]. Suddenly I saw that the roof has lifted up from the walls on the eastern side and a strong light was coming inside the room. Then I saw a saintly figure entering in the enlightened room. I stood up and shook his hands and then sat in front of him in a humble and respectful squatting posture. After a while the scene disappeared. Years later, when I saw a photograph of Mirza Ghulam Ahmad, I could recognize that he was the person I had seen in the vision.

Ismail would always say he had taken his Bay'ah in that Vision in 1887. Yousaf named him as the first Ahmadi among the Pashtoons of the North West Frontier.

== Ismail and Ahmadiyya ==
He was a subscriber to Mirza Ghulam Ahmad's Barahin-e-Ahmadiyya.

When the Founder of the Ahmadiyya Community published his claim to be the promised Messiah in his books Fatah Islam and Tauzi Muram in 1891, Ismail commented that "The writer speaks like the Messengers of Bani Israel"; his Bible translation work had made him acquainted with the Biblical prophets.

He became a spiritual disciple of the Syed Amir of Kotah (Swabi), and claimed to have had a vision of the Syed in which he had 'seen' the ushering in of the era of the Mahdi of the End time.

In Tohfa e Golariya, Mirza Ghulam Ahmad wrote:

Among those narrators is one, Mirza Muhammad Ismail. He lives in street ‘Gul Badsha Ji’ at Peshawar City. He retired as District Inspector of Schools; he is an honorable and righteous person and has no oath of Bay’ah (Oath of Allegiance) with me. He remained in the company of Syed Amir Sahib of Kotha, being his longtime companion. He has deposed his testimony [in writing] to Syed Sarwar Shah sahib, “I have heard from the Syed of Kotha, he [Syed Amir] said "the Mahdi of the End-time is already born, but has not yet appeared". When asked, what is his name? He said, he would not tell the name, but could only tell, his tongue is Punjabi.”

== Death ==
Muhammad Ismail lived in Peshawar from 1852 to 1912, dying on September 18, 1912.
