= Henry George Raverty =

British Indian Army officer (1825–1906)

Henry George Raverty (31 May 1825 – 20 October 1906) was a Cornish officer and linguist in the British Indian Army.

== Life ==
Raverty was born in Falmouth, Cornwall.

He served from 1843 to 1864, rising to the rank of Major in the 3rd Bombay Native Infantry.

Raverty fought in the Punjab campaign of 1849–1850 and Swat campaign of 1850. He compiled a gazetteer of Peshawar. While serving in Peshawar he was taught Pashto by the scholar Qazi Abdur Rahman Khan Muhammadzai (1827–1899) and Mirza Muhammad Ismail (1813–1912) and he began to study Afghan poetry.

On retirement from the army, he returned to England and continued his oriental studies, culminating in his vast Notes on Afghanistan and part of Baluchistan and his unpublished History of Herat. He died at Grampound Road, Cornwall, England in 1906.

== Works ==
- A Grammar of the Pukhto, Pushto or Language of the Afghans (1855; 2nd edition 1860; 3rd edition, 1867)
- Thesaurus of English and Hindūstānī Technical Terms (1859)
- A Dictionary of the Puk'hto, Pushto, or Language of the Afghans (1860; 2nd edition, 1867)
- Selections from the Poetry of the Afghāns, from the Sixteenth to the Nineteenth Century (1862)
- The Gulshan-i-roh : being selections, prose and poetical, in the Pus'hto, or Afghān language (1867)
- The Fables of Aesop al-Hakīm (1871)
- A Pushto Manual (1880)
- The Tabakat-i-Nasiri of Minhaj-i-Saraj, Abu-Umar-i-Usman: A general history of the Muhammadan dynasties of Asia, including Hindustan from A. H. 194 (810 A. D.) to A. H. 658 (1260 A. D.), and the irruption of the infidel Mughals into Islam (1881) (translation from the Persian)
- Notes on Afghanistan and part of Baluchistan (1881–1888, Pakistani edition 1978)
- The Mihran of Sind and its Tributaries a Geographical and Historical Study (1892, ASIATIC SOCIETY OF BENGAL, Extra No.)
