= Wa Technical Institute =

School in Wa, Ghana

- Wa Municipal, Upper West Region; Ghana

Information
- Type: Technical
- Grades: Forms [1-3]
- Nickname: WATECH

Wa Technical Institute (also known as WATECH or WTI) is an educational institution located in the Wa Municipal in the Upper West Region of Ghana. In September 2025, the school took part in a capacity-training for members of She Lead Girls Clubs organized by the Community Aid for Rural Development (CARD Ghana) in Wa.

== History ==
In May 2016, the school was a beneficiary of a facility estimated at $124 million under the Development of Skills for Industry Projects (DSIP).

As at 2019, the Principal of the school is Mr. Saaka Adams.

As at 2021, the Vice Principal of the school is Mr Osbert Salifu Dambia.

== Amenities ==
- Sick bay
