= Akpaki Dagbara II =

Former Beninese king

Akpaki Dagbara II was the king of the Bariba State of Paraku, in eastern Benin, until his death in 2004. The throne remained vacant for almost eight years. Two candidates, one designated by the Baparapé chief, the other by chief of Gbégourou, both customarily empowered to appoint the successor of a deceased king, had battling for the throne. In 2012 Akpaki Boukou Kinnin II rose to become the king of State of Paraku.

== See also ==
- List of rulers of the Bariba state of Paraku
- List of current constituent African monarchs
