= Abdul Rahim Nayyar =

Missionary and pioneer of the Ahmadiyya movement in West Africa (1883–1948)

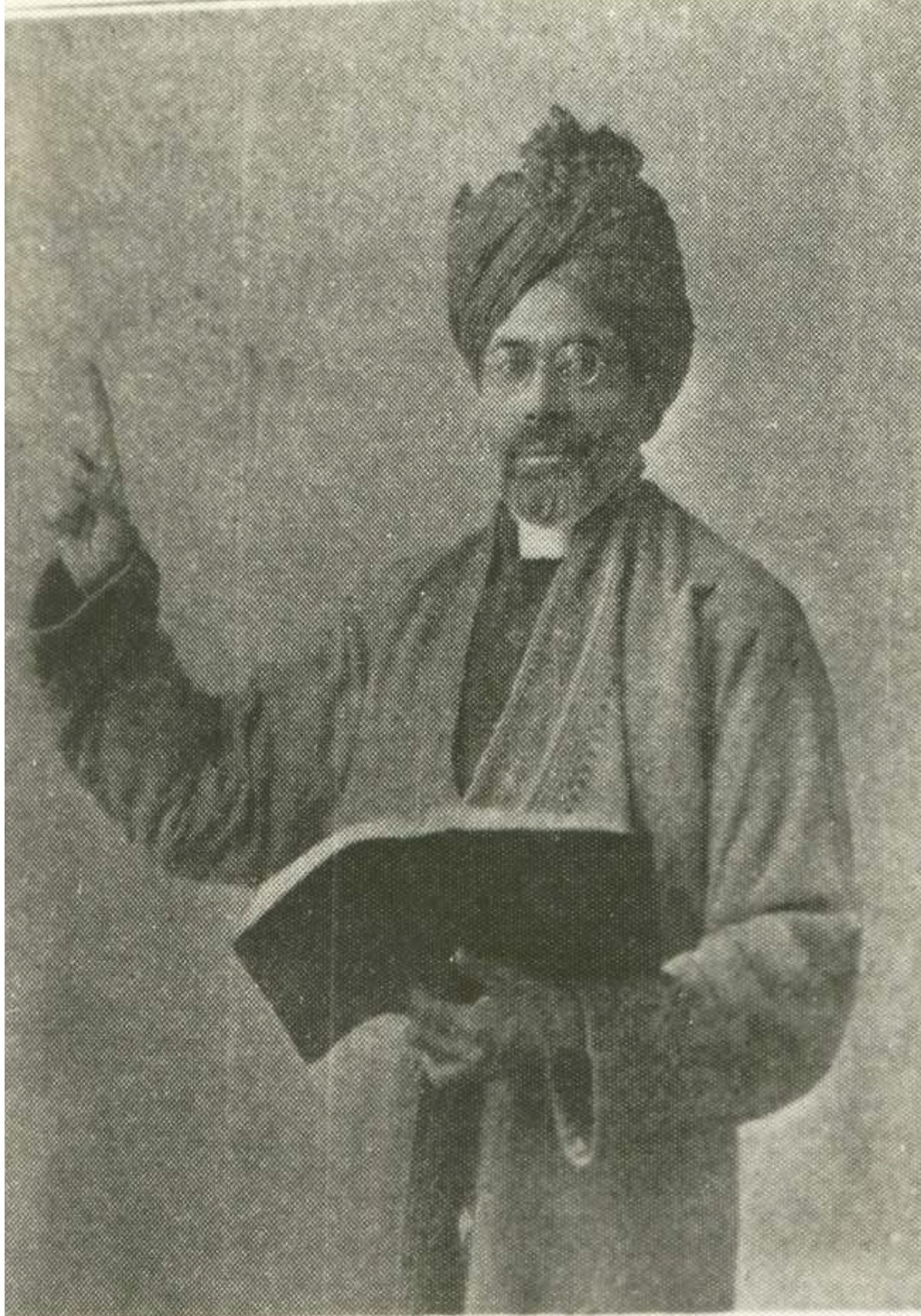
- Born: December 1883; Kapurthala, Punjab, British India
- Died: 17 September 1948 (aged 64); Gujranwala, Punjab, Pakistan
- Occupation(s): Muslim Missionary, Religious Scholar
- Known for: establishing Ahmadiyya Islam in West Africa

Al-Hajj Abdul Rahim Nayyar (December 1883 – September 17, 1948) was a companion of Mirza Ghulam Ahmad and a missionary of the Ahmadiyya Islamic movement in West Africa. He pledged allegiance to Ghulam Ahmad, formally joining the Ahmadiyya movement, in 1901. Travelling to the Gold Coast (present day Ghana) in 1921 upon invitation from Muslims in Saltpond, Nayyar was instrumental in consolidating Ahmadiyya missions in several West African countries.

== Missionary work ==
Abdul Rahim Nayyar was initially sent by the caliph Mirza Bashir-ud-Din Mahmud Ahmad to London in 1919 where he worked, briefly, with Fateh Muhammad Sial. He was instructed by the caliph to leave for the Gold Coast, however, when a nascent group of Sunni Muslims and ex-Christians among the Fante people in the southern region of the colony, no longer interested in remaining under the spiritual supervision of Hausa Muslim clerics from the north, made contact with the caliph in Qadian, India, through the Review of Religions and requested assistance. The Fante Muslims were initially informed of the presence of the Indian-origin Ahmadiyya movement in Nigeria by a resident of Saltpond who himself was originally from Nigeria. Nayyar sailed from London to Freetown, in Sierra Leone. While in Freetown Nayyar delivered a lecture at a mosque in Fourah Bay, in the east end of the city at the request of the city's chief Imam. Although at least six people are said to have conveyed their adherence to the Ahmadiyya movement in Sierra Leone as early as 1916 after being influenced by the circulation of Ahmadiyya literature from neighbouring West African nations, no conversions were recorded following Nayyar's visit.

After the brief Hiatus in Freetown, Nayyar continued towards Saltpond in the Gold Coast where he arrived in March 1921. Following a lecture, the Fante community "believed there and then", following which an oath of allegiance was held. In the history of the Ahmadiyya Muslim Community, Mahdi Appah, the leader of this group, is regarded as the first Ghanaian to become an Ahmadi Muslim. Despite resistance from northern clerics, the Fante Muslims converted en masse, giving immediate rise to the Ahmadiyya movement in the region. Nayyar also toured Accra and Kumase. Having established the movement in the Gold Coast, Nayyar left within a month for Lagos, in Nigeria, before returning again in fall of 1921. While in Nigeria, Nayyar made very early connections with other Muslim groups from which many also joined the Ahmadiyya movement including the Imam of a Quranist group. Nayyar left the colony once again in 1922 and was replaced by Al Hajj Fadl-ul-Rahman Hakim, as the first permanent missionary to the Gold Coast. After consolidating the Ahmadiyya missions in West Africa, Nayyar returned to London where he was present when the caliph visited the city to lay the foundation of the London mosque in 1924 and thence returned with the caliph to India.

== See also ==
- Ahmadiyya in Ghana
