= Shams ud Din Khan =

Indian Ahmadi leader (1900–1969)

Khan in 1965

Shams ud Din Khan (26 January 1900 – 7 November 1969) was an early Pashtun Ahmadi in the North West Frontier province of India. (Now Khyber Pakhtunkhwa Pakistan) He remained its Provincial Ameer [Head] (1969). He was a close associate of Khalifatul Masih II and III.( Mirza Basheer-ud-Din Mahmood Ahmad and Mirza Nasir Ahmad) in his lifetime. He was a member of the Jama'at Khilafat Committee [Electoral College] and was one of the two proposers of the name of Mirza Nasir Ahmad at the time of his Election to the seat of Khilafat in November 1965. He remained a member of the Majlis Shura [Consultative Assembly] of the Ahmadiyya Muslim Community in Pakistan.

== Early life ==
Khan was born on 26 January 1900, to Hafiz Haji Noor Muhammad (1835-1904). His father died when he was four. Noor Muhammad, had an important legacy associated with him in the history of Ahmadiyya Community. Something which ultimately led Shams ud Din Khan to convert to Ahmadiyya in 1927. He received his education from the Islamia Collegite High School at Peshawar.(1917) He married three times, every time after the death of his wives. He had thirteen children, six sons and seven daughters. He was son-in-law to Sahibzada Abdul Lateef, a cousin of Sahibzada Nawab Sir Sahibzada Abdul Qayyum (1863 – 1937) (Once Chief Minister North West Frontier Province (1937) and Founder of the Islamia College Peshawar) His wife Amatul Aziz Begum (1924-2016) had been Sadar (Head) of the Women Wing Ahmadiyya Community, Lajna Imaillah North West Frontier Province.

== Conversion ==
The family of Khan had a unique historical link with the Ahmadiyya movement. His father Hafiz Haji Noor Muhammad, went to Qadian in 1901. He met the Founder of Ahmadiyya Community, Mirza Ghulam Ahmad. In fact Noor Muhammad had taken all this trouble, in his old age, and took the journey from Kotha Gari Amazai, District Swabi to Qadian to testify and see for himself the fulfillment of a vision of his own spiritual master Syed Ameer Sahib of Khota (1800-1879) Swabi.

This witness of Noor Muhammad, said to be a vision, of Syed Ameer sahib of Kotha (1800-1879), and has been recorded in his book ‘Tohfa e Golarviyya’ by Mirza Ghulam Ahmad (1902); Noor Muhammad narrated his master’s vision:

"I am now living in someone else’s Era. … The Mahdi is born, but the time of his appearance has not yet come…. His tongue is Punjabi…" [ Pashto Transcription: us mong da bal cha pa zamana ke oso...Mahdi paida shawey dey, kho la wakht ye da zuhoor na dey...da hagha jaba Punjabi da ]

The vision has also been mentioned independently, by other sources, not associated with the Ahmadiyya Community, Sahibzada Muhammad Ashraf (of the progeny of Syed Ameer sahib) in his biography of Syed Ameer sahib mentions the same experience of the Syed.

It is reported that Shams ud Din's father did not accept Mirza Ghulam Ahmad, he was old and weak, and he could not go back to his home and died at Nainital India in 1904. This strong emotional legacy must have touched Shams ud Din. He read the book 'Tohfa e Golarviyya' in 1927, with all the transforming effects of his father being mentioned by Mirza Ghulam Ahmad, his journey to Qadian India and never returning home, leaving Shams ud Din an orphan at age four. He took Bay'ah at the hands of Khalifatul Masih II in 1927.

== Death ==
Khan took part in the Election of the Third Caliph of the Ahmadiyya Community after the demise of Mirza Basheer-ud-Din Mahmood Ahmad on the 7 November 1965. He served as the Provincial Head of the Jamaat in Khyber Pakhtunkhwa until his death on 14 February 1969. He was buried at Rabwah in the Bahishti Maqbara (English : The Heavenly Graveyard). Mirza Nasir Ahmad Khalifatul Masih III offered his funeral prayers and personally participated in the funeral procession.
