= Khalil Gamanga =

Paramount Chief of the Simbaru Chiefdom

Khalil Gamanga was a Paramount Chief of the Simbaru Chiefdom, in Kenema District, Sierra Leone. Boajibu, a town in Kenema District is the chiefdom headquarters.
