= Kenawa Gamanga =

Kenawa Gamanga was a Paramount Chief of the Simbaru Chiefdom, in Kenema District, Sierra Leone. Boajibu, a town in Kenema District is the chiefdom headquarters.
