= Saleh Muhammad Alladin =

Indian astrophysicist (1931–2011)

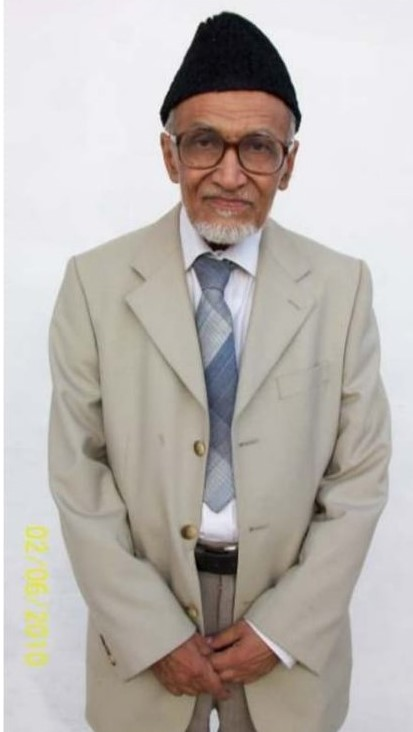
Dr. Hafiz Saleh Muhammad Alladin

Dr. Hafiz Saleh Muhammad Alladin (3 March 1931 – 20 March 2011) was an Indian Ahmadi Muslim astronomer. Alladin received a PhD from the University of Chicago in 1963. He was among the most famous 100 astronomers of the world and served as the educational advisor to former President APJ Abdul Kalam of India. He wrote many books, penned hundreds of articles and published more than 50 research papers. He then became a professor at the Osmania University in Hyderabad, where he was Director of the Center of Advanced Study in Astronomy.

Alladin was a prominent member of many scientific societies such as the International Astronomical Union, Astronomical Society of India, Plasma Science Society of India, the Indian Association for General Relativity and Gravitation and the Indian Association of Physics Teachers.

== Solar and lunar eclipse in 1894 ==
Alladin showed that solar and lunar eclipses occur simultaneously every 22 years during Ramadan but for them to occur at a specific area is almost impossible, and that the last solar and lunar eclipses above Qadian occurred 600 years ago.

== Religion ==
Alladin's grandfather Seth Abdullah Alladin was the first in his family to join the Ahmadiyya Muslim Community and devoted a large part of his wealth to that cause. He was the president of Sadar Anjuman Ahmadiyya, the highest body of Ahmadiyya Muslim Jamat in India under the Khalifatul Masih V Mirza Masroor Ahmad for 4 years. He was referred as Ulul Albab by Mirza Masroor Ahmad which means one of those gifted with understanding.

== Personal life ==
Alladin was born in Hyderabad, India. He died on 20 March 2011 after a brief illness.

== Awards ==
- Meghnad Saha Award der UGC New Delhi (1981)
- Bharat Excellence Award
- Friendship Forum of India
