= Hadayatullah Hübsch =

German author

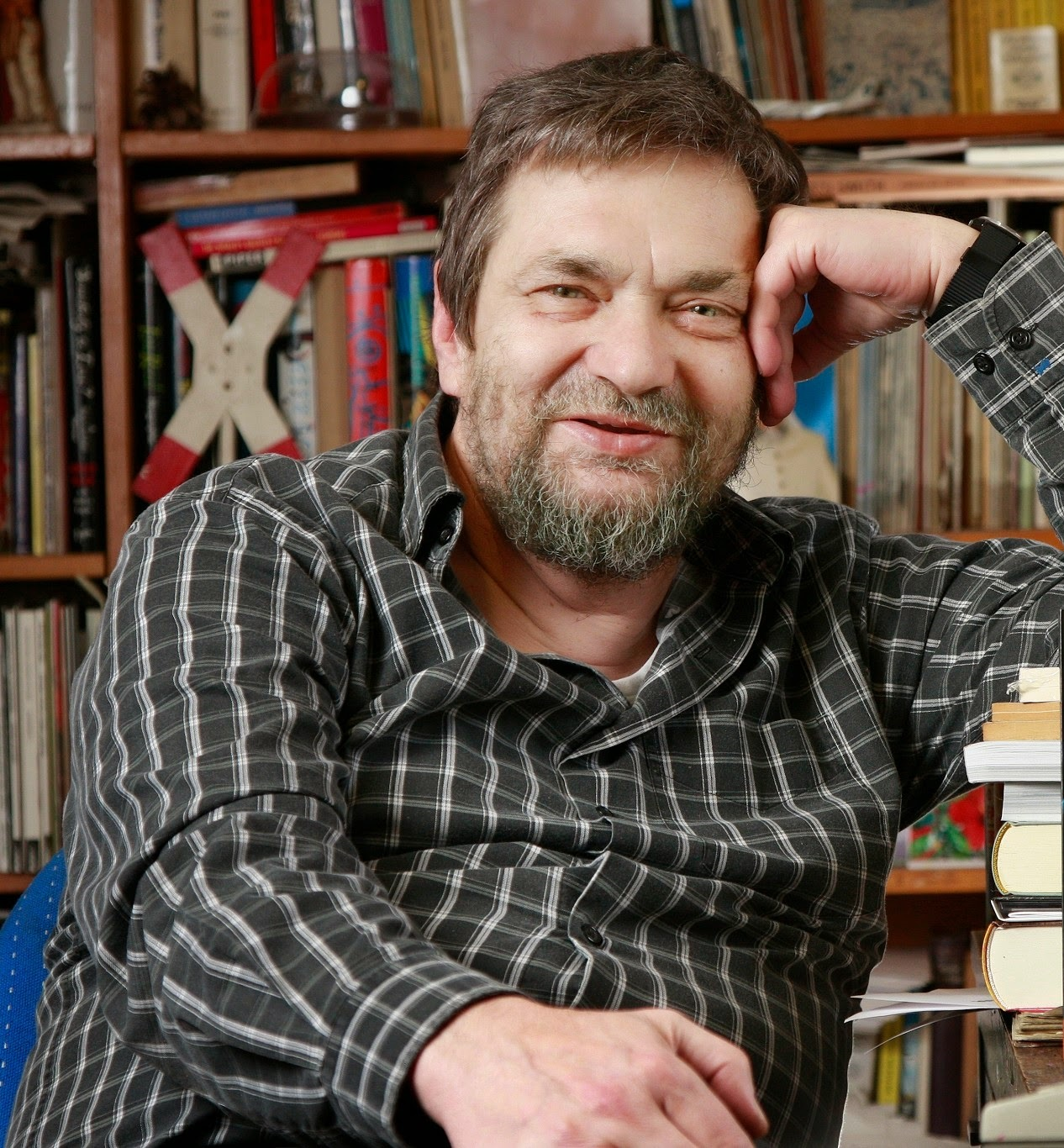
- Hübsch in 2009
- Born: Paul-Gerhard Hübsch; 8 January 1946; Chemnitz
- Died: 4 January 2011 (aged 64); Frankfurt
- Occupations: Writer, journalist, poet, activist, Imam, translator, artist
- Children: Khola Maryam Hübsch, 7 others
- Writing career
- Genres: Beat literature, poetry, non-fiction, essay, journalism, memoir, Islamic literature
- Website: hadayatullah.de

Hadayatullah Hübsch (January 8, 1946 in Chemnitz – January 4, 2011; born as Paul-Gerhard Hübsch) was a German author, journalist, poet, political activist of the 68s movement and, following his conversion to Ahmadiyya Islam, long-time spokesman of the Ahmadi Community in Germany. He also served as an Imam of the Noor Mosque in Frankfurt. From 1991 to 1998 he was chairman of the Association of German Writers (VdS) in Hesse and in his last years he worked as a writer in Frankfurt.

== Life and work ==
=== Early life and activism ===
Born into a middle-class Christian family, Paul-Gerhard Hübsch attended the Paul-Gerhardt-school in Laubach (Oberhessen), later going on to study at the Laubach-Kolleg. He was not interested in school but developed a liking for philosophy and poetry. Between 1965 and 1967, he was a member of the Hessian anti-war committee Ostermarschs and became active in radical left-wing politics, particularly in initiating anti-Vietnam war demonstrations. After completing his Abitur, Hübsch refused military service and during the German student movement of the APO, he was affiliated with, inter alia, the Kommune 1. During this period, he also experimented with a number of drugs, especially with LSD. He was also the co-founder of the leftist organisation Club Voltaire in Frankfurt and opened the first alternative bookstore in Germany, the "Heidi Loves You" shop in Frankfurt-Bockenheim.

=== Conversion to Islam ===
Hübsch inclined towards Islam during a trip to Morocco in 1969 where he claimed to have had a spiritual experience in the Moroccan desert steppe. Some years later, after a meeting with Mirza Nasir Ahmad, the third Ahmadi Caliph, back in Germany, he joined the Ahmadiyya movement, took on the name Hadayatullah (Guided by Allah) and dedicated himself to the study of Islam, being associated with the Noor Mosque in Frankfurt, where he would later serve as Imam himself and deliver the Friday sermons in German.

In the early 1970s, several volumes of his poetry were published, still under the name of Paul-Gerhard Hübsch by various publishers. His work featured regularly for eight years in the Frankfurter Allgemeine Zeitung which also published his poems until 1979, although after he embraced Islam, he had received a notice of termination which stated that Hübsch was "an extraordinary phenomenon that bustled every bourgeois frame of the West".

=== Literary activity and Journalism ===
Hübsch continued to publish in various national dailies such as Die Welt; taz; and the Süddeutsche Zeitung as well as various alternative literary magazines such as Ulcus Molle Info; Der Metzger; and Die Brücke – Forum für antirassistische Politik und Kultur. From 1991 to 1998, he was the chairman of the Association of German Writers in Hessen and worked for the Ethics Council of the country. He also devoted himself to the visual arts, specifically collage as a leisure time activity which he exhibited. Besides poetry, Hübsch also wrote prose work such as essays novels, several plays and satires, as well as non-fiction works related to topics ranging from rock music to Islam and the Ahmadiyya movement. His works on Islam, included Der Weg Mohammeds (The Way of Muhammad); Prophezeiungen des Islam (Prophecies of Islam); and Fanatische Krieger im Namen Allahs (Fanatical Warriors in the Name of Allah). He also translated several books from English into German, including Jesus in India and the classical Islamic work Tazkirat al-Awliya by Attar of Nishapur. As a journalist, he wrote reviews and made contributions on radio and in literary magazines. In the late 1970s and early 1980s he worked as a reporter and feature writer for the youth radio Hessischer Rundfunk (hr). Since 1990, Hübsch was the director of the Ahmadi Muslim publishing house Der Islam and as a spokesman for the Ahmadi community in Germany, had committed himself to interreligious dialogue, delivering lectures on Ahmadiyya teachings, throughout Germany.

Hübsch also worked as a guest author and interview partner for the newspapers Junge Welt and the Junge Freiheit with contributions on Islam and on integration. In 2006 he was interviewed by the far-right magazine, Hier & Jetzt of the NPD’s youth organisation. His attempts to foster an understanding of migrants and Islam among the New Right partially received strong criticism by those on the left who thought his engagement with the movement was inappropriate. Hübsch responded to these criticisms in his piece Von der Liebe zur Wahrheit (From Love to Truth) in which he referred to his decades of political and literary commitment against racism and declared as his Islamic duty to clarify “the truths” of his religion whenever and wherever the opportunity arose, stating that this was the reason he also gave interviews to the Bild newspaper. Hübsch also made television appearances on programmes such as the ZDF political talk show Maybrit Illner and Friedman on N24, as well as other televised debates.

He published his memoirs in 1991 under the title Keine Zeit für Trips (No Time for Trips) and a summary of his life was published in 1998 under the title Alles war Geheimnis (Everything was Secret) in Claus Wolfschlag’s anthology Bye-bye '68. Towards the end of his life he was working on his book Der muslimische Witz (The Muslim Joke).

Hübsch married twice and was the father of eight children. The journalist and writer Khola Maryam Hübsch is his daughter. He died on the morning of January 4, 2011. The Hessian Minister for Justice and Integration, Jörg-Uwe Hahn acknowledged Hübsch’s literary work and his contribution to integration, describing him as “one of the most prominent German converts” a supporter of “liberal Islam” and “like hardly any other, a bridge between the worlds”. On the first anniversary of his death, the first Poetry Memorial was held for Hadayatullah Hübsch, organized by the Association of German Writers of Hesse.

== Publications ==
- Der Weg Mohammeds. Islam – Religion der Zukunft? Reinbek bei Hamburg, 1989; ISBN 978-3-499-18475-8
- Keine Zeit für Trips. Autobiographischer Bericht; Verlag Der Islam, Frankfurt am Main 1991; o. ISBN
- Jazz hat keine Worte. Über Jazz und Lyrik; 1991; ISBN 978-3-923588-26-8
- Stop Mond 18; Pendragon Verlag, Bielefeld 1992; ISBN 978-3-923306-56-5
- Ein Ort des Friedens; Verlag Der Islam, Frankfurt 1992; ISBN 978-3-921458-77-8
- Umgeben von sanften Zellen. Gedichte; Nosmas Verlag, Hanau 1992; nummerierte und vom Autor signierte Auflage, 50 Ex.;
- Muslima. Zur Position der Frauen im Islam; Verlag Der Islam, Frankfurt/Main 1992; ISBN 978-3-921458-78-5
- Prophezeiungen des Islam; Droemer Knaur, 1993; ISBN 978-3-426-86022-9
- PENG. Langer Brief eines 68ers an seine Tochter; Betzel Verlag, Nienburg 1993; ISBN 978-3-929017-16-8
- Zur Stadt der glücklichen Tränen (Herausgeber); Verlag Der Islam, Frankfurt/Main 1994; ISBN 978-3-921458-93-8
- Die Kosmologie des Islam; Clemens Zerling, Berlin 1995; ISBN 978-3-88468-061-2
- Mein Weg zum Islam; Verlag Der Islam, Frankfurt/Main 1996; o. ISBN
- Frauen im Islam. 55 Fragen und Antworten; Betzel Verlag, Nienburg 1997; ISBN 978-3-929017-77-9
- Islam 99. Fragen und Antworten zum Islam; Betzel Verlag, Nienburg 1998; ISBN 978-3-929017-23-6
- Alles war Geheimnis. Vom LSD zum Islam; in: Claus-M. Wolfschlag (Hrsg.): Bye-bye ’68. Renegaten der Linke, APO-Abweichler und allerlei Querdenker berichten; Graz, Stuttgart 1998
- little mags. Unabhängige Literaturzeitschriften; Berlin 2001; ISBN 978-3-932909-80-1
- Fanatische Krieger im Namen Allahs. Die Wurzeln des islamistischen Terrors; Hugendubel/Diederichs, München 2001; ISBN 978-3-7205-2296-0
- Muslimische Heilige und Mystiker (Übersetzer); Hugendubel/Diederichs, München 2002; ISBN 978-3-7205-2342-4
- Macht den Weg frei. Gedichte; Horlemann Verlag, 2002; ISBN 978-3-89502-076-6
- Paradies und Hölle. Jenseitsvorstellungen im Islam; Patmos, 2003; ISBN 978-3-491-72471-6
- Die ersten Hundert. Bücher von Hadayatullah Hübsch aus über 30 Jahren Subkultur in Deutschland; Ariel-Verlag, 2003; ISBN 978-3-930148-24-0
- Vorkriegsgedichte, mit einer Zeichnung von Frank Wildenhahn; Corvinus Presse, Berlin 2003; ISBN 978-3-910172-84-5. Desgleichen ist eine Vorzugsausgabe mit einer Kaltnadelradierung von Frank Wildenhahn erschienen. Druck der Radierung: Dieter Bela, Berlin.
- Mein erstes Buch der Tiere: Islam für Kinder (zusammen mit Fareed Ahmad); Verlag Der Islam, Frankfurt 2007; ISBN 978-3-932244-26-1
- Peace Train: Von Cat Stevens zu Yusuf Islam; Palmyra Verlag, Heidelberg 2009; ISBN 978-3-930378-76-0
- Marock'n'Roll (Beat-Gedichte); gONZoverlag, Mainz 2010; ISBN 978-3-9812237-5-0
- Monolith (Pop-Gedichte, letzte Buchveröffentlichung zu Lebzeiten); Edition Schwarzdruck, Berlin November 2010; ISBN 978-3-935194-34-1
- Der Muslimische Witz; Patmos, 2011; ISBN 978-3-8436-0001-9
