= Mumuni Koray =

Wa Na Mumuni Koray
- Wa Na
- Reign: 1949 - 1953
- Coronation: November 1949
- Predecessor: Pelepuo
- Successor: Momori Bondiri
- Born: Wa, Gold Coast
- Died: 1953
- Religion: Islam

Wa Na Mumuni Koray was the ruler of Wa, in modern-day Ghana. He succeeded Wa Na Pelepuo in November 1949 and died four years later in 1953.
