= Orou Igbo Akambi =

King of Toui, in central Benin

Orou Igbo Akambi is the king of Toui, in central Benin.
