= M. M. Ahmad =

Pakistani civil servant

- Born: Mirza Muzaffar Ahmad; 18 February 1913; Qadian, Punjab, British India
- Died: 23 July 2002 (aged 89); Washington DC, United States

Mirza Muzaffar Ahmad (28 February 1913 – 23 July 2002), commonly known as M. M. Ahmad, was the former executive director and Vice President of the World Bank. MM Ahmad was also a Pakistani civil servant, and a member of the Ahmadiyya Muslim Community

== Education and early life ==
He was educated first at Government College, Lahore, and later at the University of London and the University of Oxford in the United Kingdom. He joined the Indian Civil Service - the ICS - in 1939. Following Partition in 1947, he joined the CSP (Civil Service of Pakistan), this was to mark the beginning of an illustrious and distinguished career within the Pakistan Civil Service. Mirza Muzaffar Ahmad was a member of the Ahmadiyya Community.

== International career in the World Bank and IMF ==
MM Ahmad is notable for his career as the former executive director and Vice President of the World Bank.

A few months after the religiously motivated knife attack on MM Ahmad, he left Pakistan for Washington DC. Following retirement from the Civil Service of Pakistan, he joined the World Bank initially as Executive Director for Pakistan and the Middle East and was later elected to become deputy executive secretary of the joint ministerial committee of the World Bank and the International Monetary Fund, better known as the Development Committee. He retired from that position in 1984.

== Significant achievements ==
MM Ahmad's biggest contribution was in the signing of the Indus Basin Treaty and the procurement of development assistance from bilateral and multilateral donors for the construction of Mangla and Tarbela Dams as well as a huge irrigation network. At that time he was Federal Finance Secretary. Years later, as Executive Director of the World Bank, he helped in the servicing and rescheduling of these loans after the division of Pakistan and Bangladesh in 1971. MM Ahmad also played a key role in acting as a go between China and the United States, facilitating a meeting between the then U.S. Secretary of State Henry Kissinger and the Chinese Leadership.

== Pakistani career ==
Most of this contingent of highly able and trained civil servants who opted for service in Pakistan were to play important roles in establishing the state of Pakistan. Most of them went to Karachi, the country's first capital. MM Ahmad was first posted in Lahore, the capital of the part of Punjab that was attached to Pakistan. Among the many positions MM Ahmad held in Lahore was that of secretary of finance. Later, he went to Islamabad, Pakistan's capital, where he served in a number of senior positions, including secretary of commerce, secretary of finance, and deputy chairman of the Planning Commission.

At this juncture in his career, MM was arguably the most powerful civil servant in Pakistan, with supervisory authority over all three ministries. M M Ahmad's contribution to the process of economic development was recognised by President Ayub Khan in a presidential address in 1967, celebrating 20 years of an independent Pakistan. When General Yahya Khan deposed President Ayub Khan and placed Pakistan under martial law, M M Ahmad was appointed adviser to the new president and given the rank of a federal minister. During M M Ahmad's service, Pakistan underwent rapid industrialization and growth. This received acknowledgment both within Pakistan and amongst the international development community. MM's success was attributable to his ability to assemble a highly capable team of economists, planners and engineers such as the late Mahbub ul Haq, Sartaj Aziz and many others.

The difficult task of dismantling the One Unit was entrusted to a committee of officials headed by MM Ahmad. MM represented Punjab while Ghulam Ishaq Khan represented the Frontier Province, A.G.N. Kazi, Sindh and Yusuf Achkzai Balochitsn. MM guided the 'One Unit dissolution committee', towards resolving all outstanding issues in time set by the Yahya government. The committee's plan went into effect on 1 July 1970, when West Pakistan "One Unit" was dissolved and all power was transferred to the provinces of Balochistan, the North-west Frontier Province, Punjab and Sindh.

MM was also entrusted with the delicate task of getting the governments of East and West Pakistan to accept the macroeconomic framework developed by the Planning Commission for the Fourth Five-Year Plan. The plan was to run for the period between 1970 and 1975. Two panels of economists were set up, one chaired by Pervez Hasan, West Pakistan's Chief Economist, and the other by Professor Nurul Islam, a Bengali economist, to resolve the differences between the two provinces. The two panels arrived at different conclusions. MM Ahmad stepped into the breach to resolve the dispute between the two groups of experts and the two provinces they represented.

== Hate campaign and attempted murder ==
MM Ahmad faced a hate campaign and knife attack for his faith, he was a member of the Ahmadiyya Muslim Community.

On 15 September 1971 a CDA employee and lift operator named Aslam Qureshi attempted to stab MM Ahmad to death inside the Finance Ministry, inflamed by the conspiracy theories circulated in publications like Chattan.

MM Ahmad had been the target of a number of attacks in the right-wing Urdu press on account of his faith and the prominence of his position. Militantly religious forces which had been suppressed in the Ayub Khan era felt emboldened under the subsequent Yahya Khan government which strongly backed them against left-wing and ethnic parties.

Many radicalising messages were put out during the campaign for Pakistan's first general election in December 1970 and the subsequent atmosphere of crisis - religious parties were upset about their poor showing, and redoubled attacks on the Ahmadi community which had backed the successful PPP.

Aslam Qureshi was subsequently tried and convicted for attempted murder by a military court, but released early by Zulfiqar Ali Bhutto as part of his accommodation with Islamist parties in 1973-74. Qureshi's legal defence was provided for free by PML member Raja Zafar ul Haq who organised support along with a number of other Rawalpindi Bar Association members.

Aslam Qureshi's temporary disappearance in February 1983 was used by his Khatm-e-Nabuwwat movement to pressure General Zia's government into the passage of Ordinance XX, once again with the support of Raja Zafar ul Haq who was serving at the time as Minister for Religious Affairs.
