= Nusrat Jahan Ahmadiyya College of Education =

Teacher training college in Wa, Ghana

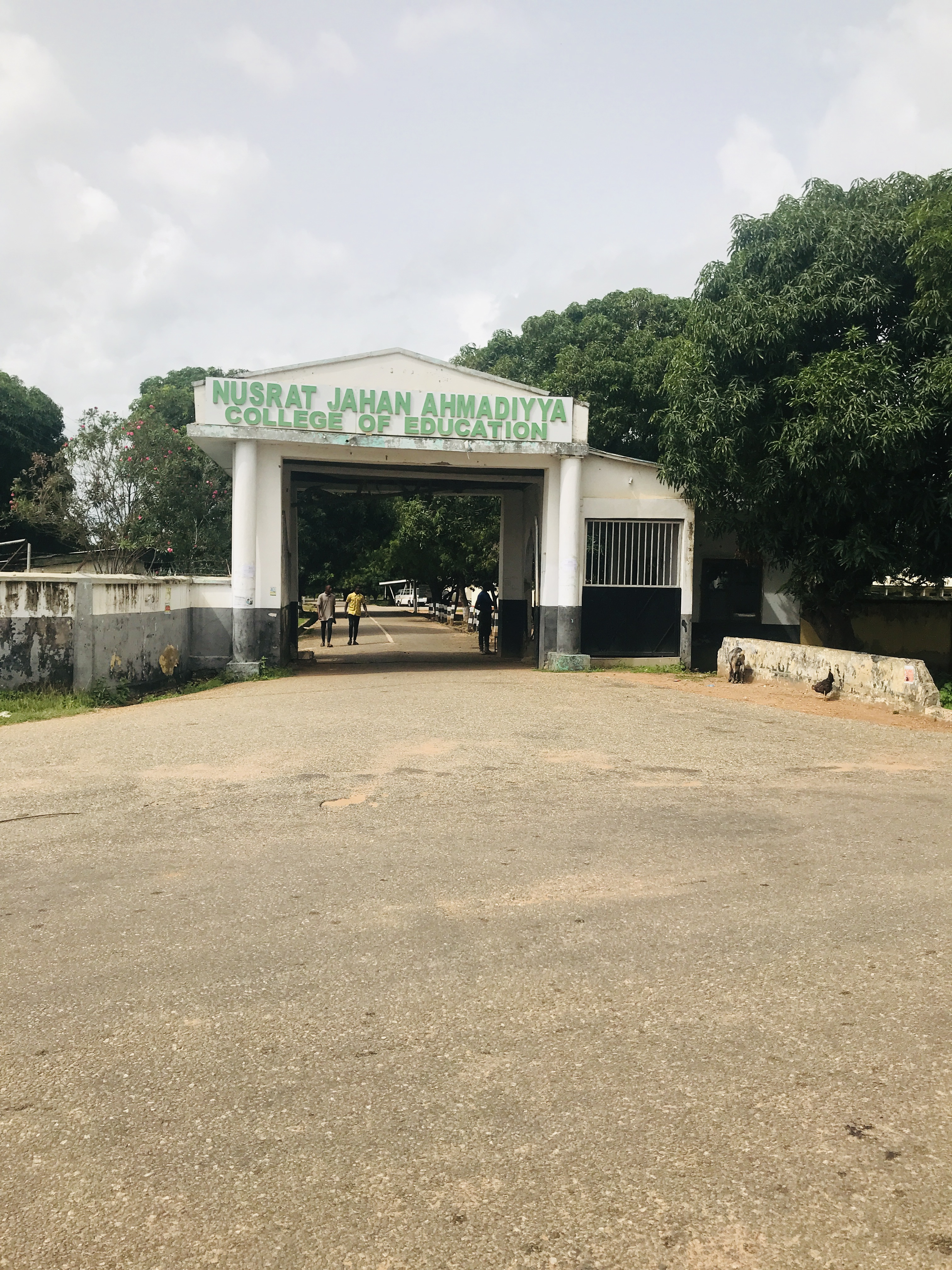
- Other name: N. J. Ahmadiyya College of Education
- Established: 1982; 44 years ago
- Affiliations: Government of Ghana
- Location: Wa, Wa Municipal District, XW0051, Ghana; 10.06669°N 2.48125°W
- Language: English
- Region Zone: Upper West; Northern Zone
- Short name: NJA
- Source: An Atlas of The Forty Colleges of Education in Ghana.

Nusrat Jahan Ahmadiyya College of Education is a teacher education college in Wa (Wa Municipal District, Upper West Region, Ghana) established in 1982. The college is located in Northern Zone. It is one of the 46 colleges of education in Ghana. The college participated in the DFID-funded T-TEL programme. The college was transformed into a three-year post secondary training college in 1991 and admits visually impaired students to be trained as teachers.

== History ==
Nusrat Jahan Ahmadiyya College of Education was established in 1982. The first principal was Mr. Mashood Ahmad Shams. The College started with Certificate ‘A’ 4-year post middle course. In 1991, the college was turned into a three-year post secondary training college, with the first batch graduating in 1993. Between the years 1985 and 1991, a two-year modular programme, which gave access to untrained teachers to enter training colleges on full-time for two years to be awarded Teacher's Certificate ‘A’ was offered in the college in addition to the three-year post secondary programme.

In 2004, the Diploma in Basic Education programme was introduced in the College. The first batch of graduates who offered this programme passed out in July 2007. The College is among the 15 colleges that were designated in October 2007 to offer quasi specialization in Science and Mathematics. Visually impaired students are also enrolled in the college to be trained as teachers. Among the 2007/2008 students are seven visually impaired trainees, two of whom are women. Nusrat Jahan College of Education was given accreditation to the tertiary level of education in October 2007 after assessment from the national Accreditation Board after she had been assessed by the National Accreditation Board (Ghana). Owusu Hakim was elected as the new SRC President in the month of March 15th 2026.@Hakman Terrascribe

The College has been administered by the following principals since it was established
Name	Years served
Mr. Mashood Ahmad	1982–1987
Mr. Kokro Ambrose	1987 (Acting)
Mr. Mumuni Seidu	1987–1993
Mr. Mumuni Zakaria	1994–1998
Mr. Khalid Mahmud	1998–2009
Mr. Yeboah - Druye C. Iddris	2009–2014
Hajia Asmau Ismail	2014–2021
Alhaj Salih Saeed	2022 (Acting)
Mr. Abdul Aziz Abdul Moomin	2023 (Acting)
Mr. Shani Osman	2024–present
