= Musheibu Mohammed Alfa =

Ghanaian politician

Hon. Musheibu Mohammed Alfa

Deputy Upper West Regional Minister
- Incumbent
- Assumed office June 2014
- President: John Dramani Mahama
- Preceded by: Abu Kabienbata Kansangabata

Deputy Minister of Environment, Science and Innovation
- In office ? – June 2014
- President: John Dramani Mahama
- Succeeded by: Tia Sugri

Personal details
- Party: National Democratic Congress

Musheibu Mohammed Alfa is a Ghanaian politician and the Deputy Minister of State for the Upper West Region of Ghana. Until June 2014, Alfa served as the Deputy Minister of Environment, Science and Innovation.
