= Khola Maryam Hübsch =

German journalist and writer

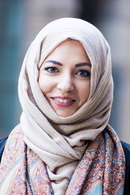
- Hübsch in 2017
- Born: 25 October 1980 (age 45); Frankfurt am Main, Hesse, Germany
- Education: University of Mainz
- Occupations: Journalist; Writer

Khola Maryam Hübsch (born 25 October 1980, in Frankfurt am Main) is a German journalist and writer of German-Indian origin. Hübsch is the daughter of the German writer Hadayatullah Hübsch. She is a prominent member of the Ahmadiyya Muslim Community of Germany.

== Work ==
Khola Maryam Hübsch studied journalism, the German language, book science and psychology at the Johannes Gutenberg University in Mainz. She writes for German newspapers, including the Frankfurter Allgemeine Zeitung, the Frankfurter Rundschau the Die Welt and a number of scientific publications and holds nationwide lectures about Islam. The German broadcaster, ARD designated Hübsch as the "öffentliche Gesicht der muslimischen Frauen in Deutschland", i.e., "the public face of Muslim women in Germany" and declared Hübsch was as "gern gesehener Gast in Talkshows; ihre Meinung findet Gehör", in other words, a guest in talk shows whose opinion will always be heard. For seven years she served as the national representative for interfaith dialogue of Lajna Imaillah, the women's auxiliary organisation of the Ahmadiyya Muslim Community of Germany and as well as a presenter for Aspekte des Islam and Islam im Brennpunkt on MTA, an Islamic TV channel.

== Publications ==
- Rebellion der Sehsucht: Warum ich mir den Glauben nicht nehmen lasse Herder 2018, ISBN 978-3451381102
- Störfaktor Glaube? Warum ein Gottesbezug in einer deutschen Landesverfassung auch Muslimen wichtig ist Bäumer, Beate/ Zabel, Frank Hrsg.: Wie viel Glaube braucht das Land? Antworten aus Politik, Kirche und Gesellschaft. Freiburg, 2017
- Von "Kopftuchmädchen" und "Ehrenmorden" - Das Bild der muslimischen Frau im öffentlichen Diskurs. Cheema, Saba-Nur, ed., (K)Eine Glaubensfrage. Religiöse Vielfalt im pädagogischen Miteinander. Frankfurt 2017.
- Zur „Muslimifizierung“ sozialer Probleme. Informations- und Dokumentationszentrum für Antirassismusarbeit e. V. Hrsg.: Rassismuskritik. Düsseldorf 2017, ISSN 1616-6027
- Ein Ring an der Hand. In: Genazino, Wilhelm, Hrsg.: Freiheit und Verantwortung. 95 Thesen heute. Stuttgart 2016., ISBN 978-3476026866
- Handbuch Christentum und Islam in Deutschland, Mouhanad Khorchide, Hrsg., Herder Verlag 2014, ISBN 978-3451311888.
- Unter dem Schleier die Freiheit - Was der Islam zu einem wirklich emanzipierten Frauenbild beitragen kann, Patmos Verlag 2014, ISBN 978-3843604734.
- Toleranz im Islam Yousefi, Hamid Reza und Seubert, Harald: Toleranz im Weltkontext: Geschichten - Erscheinungsformen - Neue Entwicklungen. Springer VS 2012, ISBN 978-3-658-00115-5.
- Selbst- und Fremdbilder der muslimischen Frau, Barbara Stollberg-Rilinger, Hrsg., "Als Mann und Frau schuf er sie". Religion und Geschlecht. Würzburg: Ergon Verlag 2013.
- Der Sinn des Lebens. Eine theologische Betrachtung Dialog – Zeitschrift für Interreligiöse und Interkulturelle Begegnung. Institut für Human- und Islamwissenschaften e.V., 2012.
- Der Islam in den Medien. Das Framing bei der Darstellung der muslimischen Frau Saarbrücken 2008, ISBN 978-3-639-04817-9.
