= Mumford, Ghana =

Mumford
- Town
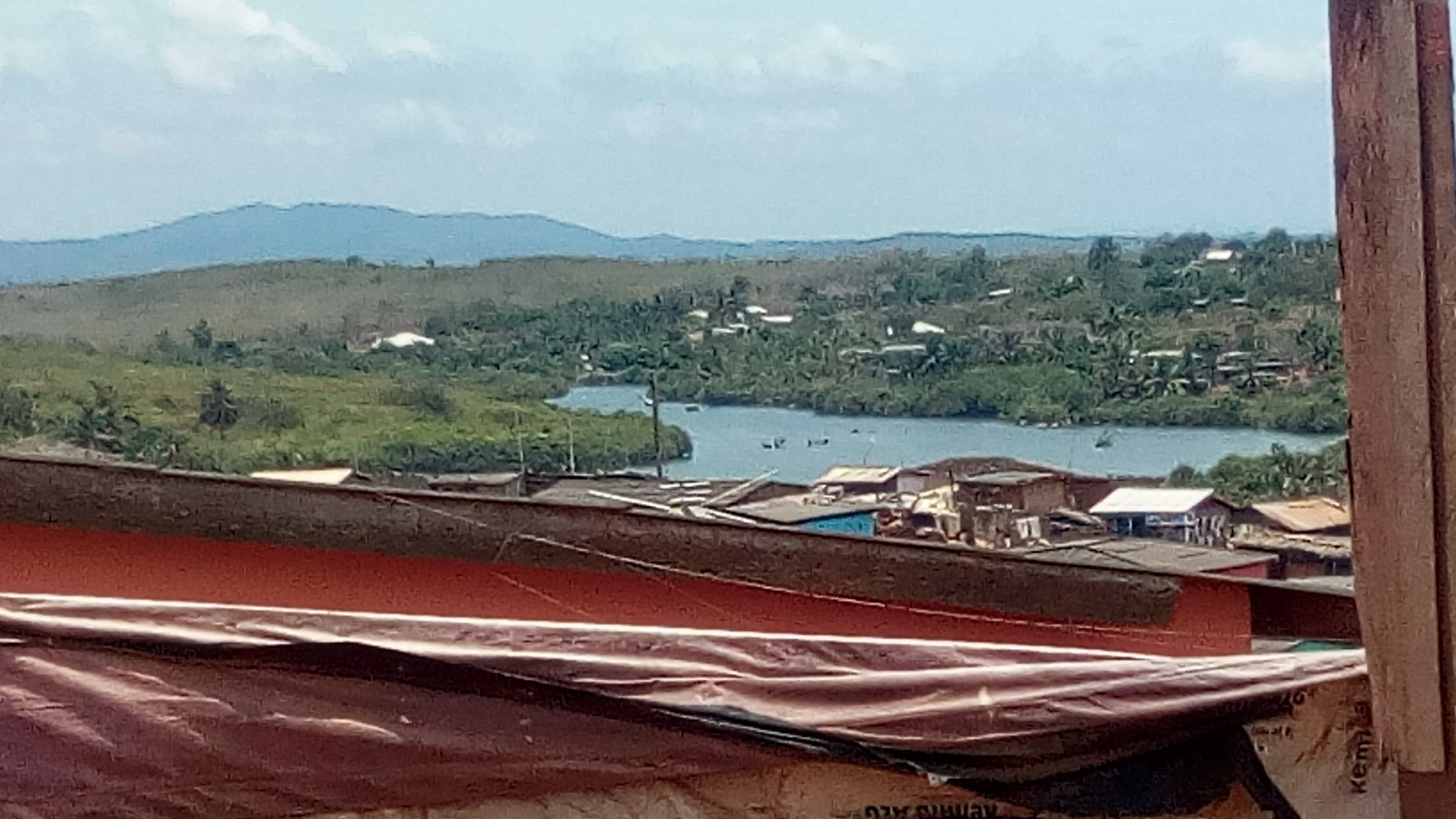
- Mumford Lagoon

- Location of Mumford in Central region
- Coordinates: 5°15′45″N 0°45′28″W
- Country: Ghana
- Region: Central Region
- District: Gomoa West District

Population (2013)
  - Total: 18,368
- Demonym: Mumfordian
- Time zone: GMT
  - Summer (DST): GMT
- Ethnicity: Akans (Fanti people)

Mumford is a town in the Gomoa West District of the Central Region of Ghana, near the Central regional capital Cape Coast. As of 2013, Mumford has a settlement population of 18,368 people. It is a fishing community and also celebrate Akwambo festival in first week of November every year.

== See also ==
- List of Railway lines
