= Qazi Muhammad Yousaf =

Qazi Muhammad Yousaf (1 September 1883 – 4 January 1963) was a companion of Mirza Ghulam Ahmad. He was regional head Amir of North West Frontier chapter of the Ahmadiyya Community.

== Early life ==
Qazi Muhammad Yousaf was born September 1, 1883, at Hoti, Maradan. The family shifted to Peshawar in 1884. His father, Qazi Muhammad Siddique, was a religious scholar and occasional imam at the Mosque in Gul Badhsh Ji Street, Peshawar. In 1896, at age 12, Muhammad Yousaf was admitted to Mission High School Peshawar He later studied at Islamia High School, completing his Secondary School Certificate Examination.

== Introduction to Ahmadiyya ==
In 1901, he came across books by Mirza Ghulam Ahmad, namely ‘Shuhna e Haq’ and ‘Izala e Auhaam’.

== Conversion and Bay'ah (Ahmadiyya) ==
On January 15, 1902, Qazi Muhammad Yousaf converted to Ahmadiyya Islam due to the efforts of his English teacher Munshi Khadim Hussain He attended the Annual Ahmadiyya Convention in December 1902 and physically took the Bay'ah (Ahmadiyya) at the hands of Mirza Ghulam Ahmad. In Qadian, he also had the opportunity to meet Sahibzada Abdul Latif.

== A dream of Khalifa Hakeem Noor-ud-Din ==
On May 28, 1908, he participated in the funeral prayers of Mirza Ghulam Ahmad and took his fresh Oath of Allegiance ( Bay'ah (Ahmadiyya) ) at the hands of the newly elected Khalifa Hakeem Noor-ud-Din. In 1912, Yousaf met Khalifa Hakeem Noor-ud-Din and presented his book Iblagh e Haq to him, giving him a written request for prayers. On the same letter, the Khalifa wrote, he would pray for him. He also wrote a ‘Ro’ya’ (dream) of his own upon the same letter. He wrote: “Insha Allah I shall pray for you. You must also persist in prayers. I saw Hadhrat Umar in a Ro’ya (dream). He was saying, ‘Iran is destroyed’. They [Iranis] abuse me, (Tabarra) l but I don’t care, I am now preparing armies. May Allah make you a commander of that army.”

== The Split and Re-patriation ==
On March 14, 1914, Khalifa Hakeem Noor-ud-Din died. The Community was split into two. Muhammad Yousaf sided with the group headed by Muhammad Ali of the Ahmadiyya Anjuman Ishaat-i-Islam Lahore.

== Personal life ==
He has listed 113 persons who converted to Ahmadiyya Islam due to his efforts. He died on January 4, 1963, and was buried at Mardan.

== List of his Works ==
He wrote regularly for the monthly Review of Religions, (Urdu) 1919-1921. the Al-Hakam, the Badar, the Al-Fazal, the Farooq. Here is a list of his Works below.

=== Bibliography ===
1. Wafat al masih nasiri (pages 52)
2. Asaar e qiamat (pages 32)
3. Nazool al masih (pages 142) (1912)
4. Aqaid e Ahmadiyya (pages 72) (1912)
5. Khurooj e dabatul al arz (pages 12) (1911)
6. Khurooj e dajjal (pages 80) (1912)
7. Tuhfa tun nubuwah (pages 80) (1912)
8. Khurooj e yajooj majooj (pages 80) (1912)
9. Zameema tuha tun nabuwah (pages 52)
10. Iblagh e haq-collected. 11. Al Islam (pages 80) (1912)
11. Attab leegh no-1 (1913)
12. Pashto poem (Pages 8)
13. Dalayal qaraniya bar wafat Isa nasiri (pages 16)
14. Attab leegh no-3
15. Dalaya wafat isa nasiri az salaf saliheen (pages 24) (1913)
16. Tardeed dalayal hayat hazrat isa nasir (pages 26) (1913)
17. Haqeeqa tul mahdi (pages 432) (1913)
18. Tazkira tun nabi (pages 240)
19. Durre adan pushto (pages 96)
20. Haqeeqa tu Yasuu
21. Al nubuwwah fil quran
22. Haqeeqa tul Masih
23. Al-mauood fil Quran (pages 56)
24. Tafseer khatam unnabiyyeen (Page 34)
25. Muta'a nabi
26. Mutalibaat burhaniyya (Pages 28)
27. Azaab aur rasool (Pages 12)
28. Al tableegh no-1 (Pages 80)
29. Pashto Lughat (Unpublished)
30. Tafseer al Quraan (4 vol) (Unpublished)
31. Pashto divan ahmadi (Pages 408)
32. Ah Nadir Shah su sho
33. Ahmadiyyat aur Afghanistan
34. Ahsanal Hadith
35. Tareekh bani Israel (unpublished)
36. Pushto zarbul amsaal
37. Pushto Qawaid
38. Afghanistan au Ahmadiyyat
39. Pashto ka Qaida
40. Wurmbay Kitaab
41. Dwayam kitaab
42. Durre Adan Farsi
43. Ahmad Mauood
44. Insaan e kamil
45. Ayat khatam an nabiyyeen wa tafseer salf saliheen
46. Wafaat hazarat Isa Nasiri
47. Aqaid Ahmadiyya
48. Khitaab ba bani Israel (Unpublished)
49. Fazeelat syedna hazrat Muhammad saw bar jamee anbiya
50. Aqaid Ahmadiyya Farsi manzoom
51. Al Nubuwat fil Quran (Pages 432)
52. Al nubuwat fil wahi wal ilhaam
53. Al nubuwat fil Ahadeeth
54. Challenge inaami yak sad rupya darbara nubuwat
55. Durre adan nazam Urdu
56. Kitaab al hayat
57. Mulvi Muhammad Ali ka maujooda mazhab- khilaf Ahmad aakhir zaman
58. Imtiaz
59. Ahmad jari ullah
60. Ahmad mudday Nubuwat
61. Ahmad madaar-e-nijaat
62. Ismu-hu-Ahnad
63. Ahmad ke dawe ki bunyaat
64. Tazkira tul hasan
65. Aik ghalat fahmi ka izala (Pages 32)
66. Anajeel ka yusu aur Quran ka Isa
67. Sianat –u-swalihhen
68. Ahmad ki pakeeza zindagi
69. Hazrat Muhammad saw ki taleemat e muqadisa
70. Muje mera mazhab kion piara he
71. Wafaat hazrat isa nasiri (Urdu)
72. Tanqeed bar ishtihaar yome dua
73. Ane wala masih aa gia
74. Do darjan challenge
75. Syedna Muhammad saw aur qiam aman
76. Aqibatul mukazibeen aul Afghanistan
77. Aqibatul mukazibeen hissa dom (Unpublished)
78. Yusu aur aasman
79. Yusu aur saleeb
80. Kia Yusu khuda tha
81. Kia Yusu khuda ka beta tha
82. Kia Yusu nabi tha
83. Kia Yusu bey guna tha
84. Issayeat ki asliyyat part-1, part-2
85. Yusu aur tasleeth
86. Khliq u tuyyor
87. Aalim ul ghaib
88. Mohaye ul mouta
89. Kalimatullah
90. Rooho Allah
91. Roohul qudus
92. Isayon ke naam aik khat
93. Isa dare Kashmir
94. Khula khat banaam molvi Sana u llah
95. Fathe mubeen
96. Master Nizam u din ke naam challenge
97. Master Nizam u din ke naam dosara challenge
98. Khula khat banam molvi Muhammad Ali
99. Mir Mudasir Shah ka mazhab khilaf hazrat ahmas as
100. Mir Mudasir Shah ke do mazhab
101. Molvi Muhammad Ali ke do swalon ka jawab
102. Ishtiharat tardded ghair mubaieen dar bara toheen rasool
103. Ishtiharat tardeed molvi Kifayat Hussain shiah
104. Ishtiaar tardeed Anjuman Ishat Islam Peshawar
105. Qaati ul anf u shiah
106. Aqaid Ahmadiyya
107. Khwaja Kamal Din ke 5 swalon ka jawab
108. Mukhtasar Tareek Ahmadiyyat Sarhad
