= Saeed Ahmad Khan =

Third emir of the Lahore Ahmadiyya Movement

Saeed Ahmad Khan (Urdu: سيد احمد خان) (1900 – 1996) was an adherent, and later third Emir, of the Lahore Ahmadiyya Movement, religious movement which evolved as a sect of Islam. He was Emir from 1981 to 1996.
