= Wala people =

Ethnic group in Ghana

Total population
- 117,000

Languages
- Wali

Religion
- Sunni Islam, Animism

The Wala or Waala live in the Upper West Region of Ghana. They are a predominantly Muslim people who are the founders of the city of Wa and the Kingdom of Wala. They speak the Wali language, which belongs to the Gur group. There are 84,800 speakers of the language as of 2013. Their neighbors are the Birifor, Dagaaba, and Vagla peoples.

Their culture is similar to other Gur-speaking, Senoufo and Mande groups in northern Côte d'Ivoire, Burkina Faso and Mali. They are known for their impressive Sudano-Sahelian style mosques and palaces. They are ruled by their traditional ruler, the Wa-Naa whose traditional residence Wa-Naa's palace is a mud-brick built palace in Wa.

According to the 1921 census of Ghana the Wala numbered 16,905, although it is thought that that census missed some of the small villages in the Wa District. This meant that at the time they were outnumbered in Wa District by the Dagarti. In many ways the difference between Dagarti and Wa is which side of the rebellion they were on in 1894, those who sided with the Wa-Na coming to be the Wala, and those who rebelled being considered part of the Dagarti people. The number of Dagarti was so high because the British had imposed the pre-1894 boundaries of the Kingdom of Wala as the boundaries of the District of Wa.

== Notable people ==
- Abdul-Rashid Pelpuo
- Salma Mumin
- Mahamud Khalid
