= Wa, Ghana =

Town in Upper West Region, Ghana

Wa
- Town
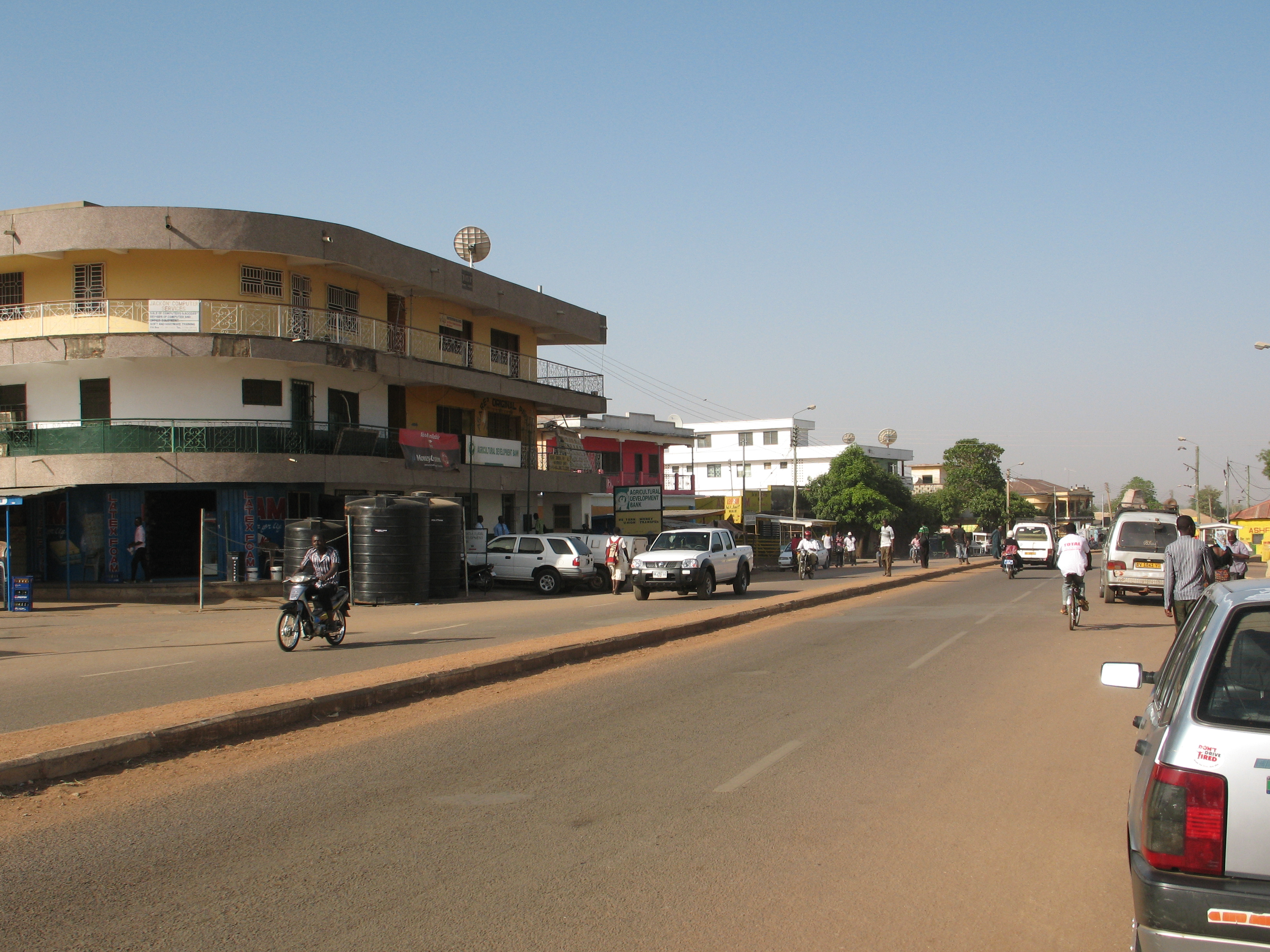
- View of a high street in Wa
- Etymology: Dagbani: Wa ("te wa kaa yeng seore", English: "we came to watch a dance")
- Location of Wa in Upper West Region
- Coordinates: 10°4′N 2°30′W
- Country: Ghana
- Region: Upper West Region
- District: Wa Municipal District
- Elevation: 305 m (1,001 ft)

Population (2021)
  - Total: 200,672
- Time zone: GMT
  - Summer (DST): GMT
- Postal code: XW
- Area code: 039
- Website: wamunicipal.gov.gh

Wa is a town and the capital of the Wa Metropolitan Assembly and the Upper West Region of Ghana. It has a population of 200,672 people, according to the 2021 census.

The town is a transportation hub for the Upper West region, with major roads leading north to Hamile, and northeast to Tumu and the Upper East Region. There is also an airport, named the Wa Airport. The name Wa is a Dagbani word meaning 'we came to watch a dance'. The town emerged as an important center of trade.

== History ==
=== Etymology ===
Wa is a Dagbani word meaning te wa kaa yeng seore ('we came to watch a dance').

=== Formation ===
Wa emerged as an important center of trade.

Under the Northern Protectorates, the town experienced slow infrastructure development due to neglect by the colonial administration.

== Administration ==
Wa has a mayor–council form of government. The mayor is appointed/approved by the town council, the Wa Municipal Assembly. The current mayor of Wa is Hon. Tahiru Issahaku Moomin.

== Economy ==
Despite its urban status, Wa is in many ways still an agricultural community with the majority of the town's population engaged in small scale farming. Main crops grown include corn, millet, yams, okra and groundnuts. The town also grows cash crops, which include soya beans, and groundnuts, bambara beans.

== Demographics ==
Historical population
Year	Pop.	±%
1921	2,806	—
1931	13,025	+364.2%
1948	14,406	+10.6%
1970	13,740	−4.6%
1984	36,067	+162.5%
2000	66,644	+84.8%
2010	125,479	+88.3%
Source: Ghana Statistical Service.

In 1880, Wa's population was estimated at about 8,000 people. This number is thought to have fallen to 2,000 by 1900. In the 1921 census, the population of the town was 2,806. The population had risen to 5,207 by 1931. In that same year, the Wa district, which was now a part of the Wala Native Authority had a population of 13,025. In 1948, Wa had a population of 14,406 while the district had 15,827 people. In 1960 the population was 14,406. In 1970 the population had risen to 13,740. The town's population was 66,644 in the 2000 census, and 125,479 in the 2010 census.

Islam is the largest religion in the town, and its followers make up 65.9% of the population. This is followed by Christianity (29%), traditionalists (4.1%), and other religions (0.4%). Major ethic groups who resided in Wa include the Wala, the Sisaala, and the Dagaaba.

== Transportation ==
There is public transport from Wa to major cities such as Accra; Kumasi, Mim, Ahafo; Cape Coast, Sunyani; Tamale; Tema; Ho; Bolgatanga; Elubo; Aflao, and Techiman.

== Geography ==
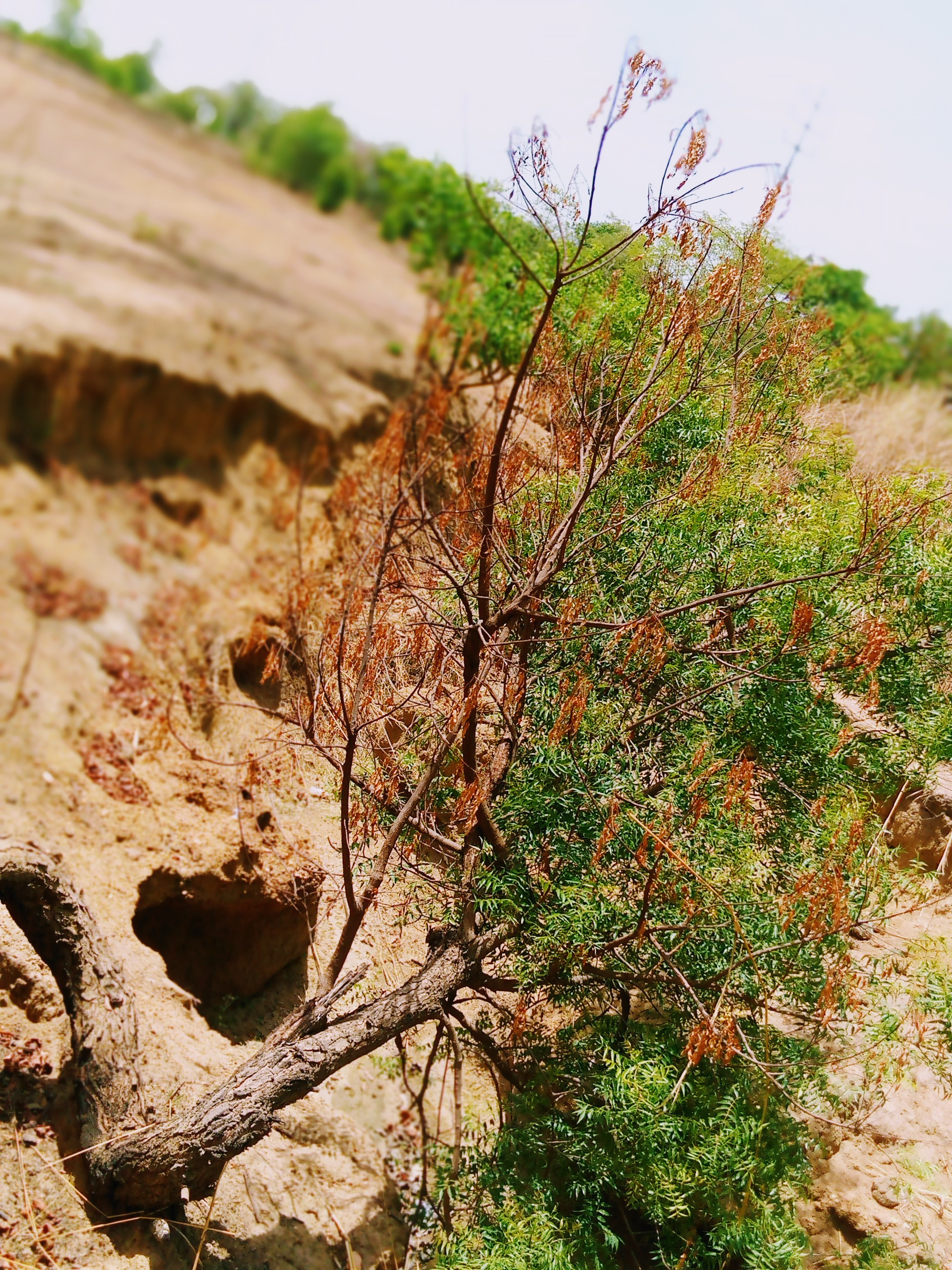
A plant in Wa

Wa is located in the north-western part of Ghana. It has a size that covers a total land area of 579.86 km^{2} (223.89 sq mi). The average land height of the town sits between 160 mm (0.52 ft) and 300 mm (0.98 ft) above sea level. The municipal share surrounding borders Daffiama-Bussie-Issa District to the north-west, Nadowli-Kaleo District to the north-east, Wa East District to the east and to the west and south the Wa West District.

=== Climate ===
Wa has a tropical savanna climate (Köppen climate classification Aw), with a wet season and a dry season and the temperature being hot year-round. The wet season usually occurs between March and July while the dry season can happen from September to November. The mean maximum temperatures can range from 34–40 °C (93–104 °F) whilst the mean minimum temperatures can reach 29 °C (84 °F). The average monthly relative humidity stands around 40.67%.

Climate data for Wa (1991-2020, extremes 1952-present)
Month	Jan	Feb	Mar	Apr	May	Jun	Jul	Aug	Sep	Oct	Nov	Dec	Year
Record high °C (°F)	39.5 (103.1)	42.0 (107.6)	42.6 (108.7)	42.5 (108.5)	40.0 (104.0)	38.0 (100.4)	38.2 (100.8)	35.7 (96.3)	36.5 (97.7)	37.5 (99.5)	39.0 (102.2)	38.5 (101.3)	42.6 (108.7)
Mean daily maximum °C (°F)	35.1 (95.2)	37.2 (99.0)	38.1 (100.6)	36.5 (97.7)	34.2 (93.6)	32.1 (89.8)	30.6 (87.1)	29.8 (85.6)	30.7 (87.3)	33.3 (91.9)	35.5 (95.9)	35.3 (95.5)	34.0 (93.2)
Daily mean °C (°F)	27.7 (81.9)	30.3 (86.5)	31.8 (89.2)	30.9 (87.6)	29.3 (84.7)	27.6 (81.7)	26.6 (79.9)	26.0 (78.8)	26.4 (79.5)	28.0 (82.4)	28.8 (83.8)	27.8 (82.0)	28.4 (83.1)
Mean daily minimum °C (°F)	20.4 (68.7)	23.3 (73.9)	25.6 (78.1)	25.4 (77.7)	24.3 (75.7)	23.2 (73.8)	22.5 (72.5)	22.1 (71.8)	22.1 (71.8)	22.7 (72.9)	22.0 (71.6)	20.3 (68.5)	22.8 (73.0)
Record low °C (°F)	12.8 (55.0)	15.6 (60.1)	17.9 (64.2)	17.5 (63.5)	17.4 (63.3)	18.4 (65.1)	17.9 (64.2)	18.3 (64.9)	18.3 (64.9)	18.9 (66.0)	16.0 (60.8)	12.2 (54.0)	12.2 (54.0)
Average precipitation mm (inches)	5.0 (0.20)	10.9 (0.43)	20.9 (0.82)	86.4 (3.40)	130.1 (5.12)	141.8 (5.58)	139.7 (5.50)	241.0 (9.49)	198.1 (7.80)	82.9 (3.26)	5.2 (0.20)	0.3 (0.01)	1,035.3 (40.76)
Average precipitation days (≥ 1.0 mm)	0.2	0.7	2.4	5.5	8.8	9.2	10.6	13.0	14.0	7.4	0.8	0.0	72.6
Average relative humidity (%) (at 15:00)	16	18	28	44	55	63	66	69	68	51	33	19	44
Mean monthly sunshine hours	271.7	241.6	239.3	235.5	247.6	219.2	193.4	161.9	187.0	256.9	269.7	276.0	2,799.8
Mean daily sunshine hours	9.2	9.4	8.6	7.5	8.6	7.6	6.7	5.7	6.3	9.2	9.3	9.6	8.1
Source 1: NOAA
Source 2: Deutscher Wetterdienst (extremes, humidity 1973-1994, daily sun 1958-1962)

== Culture ==
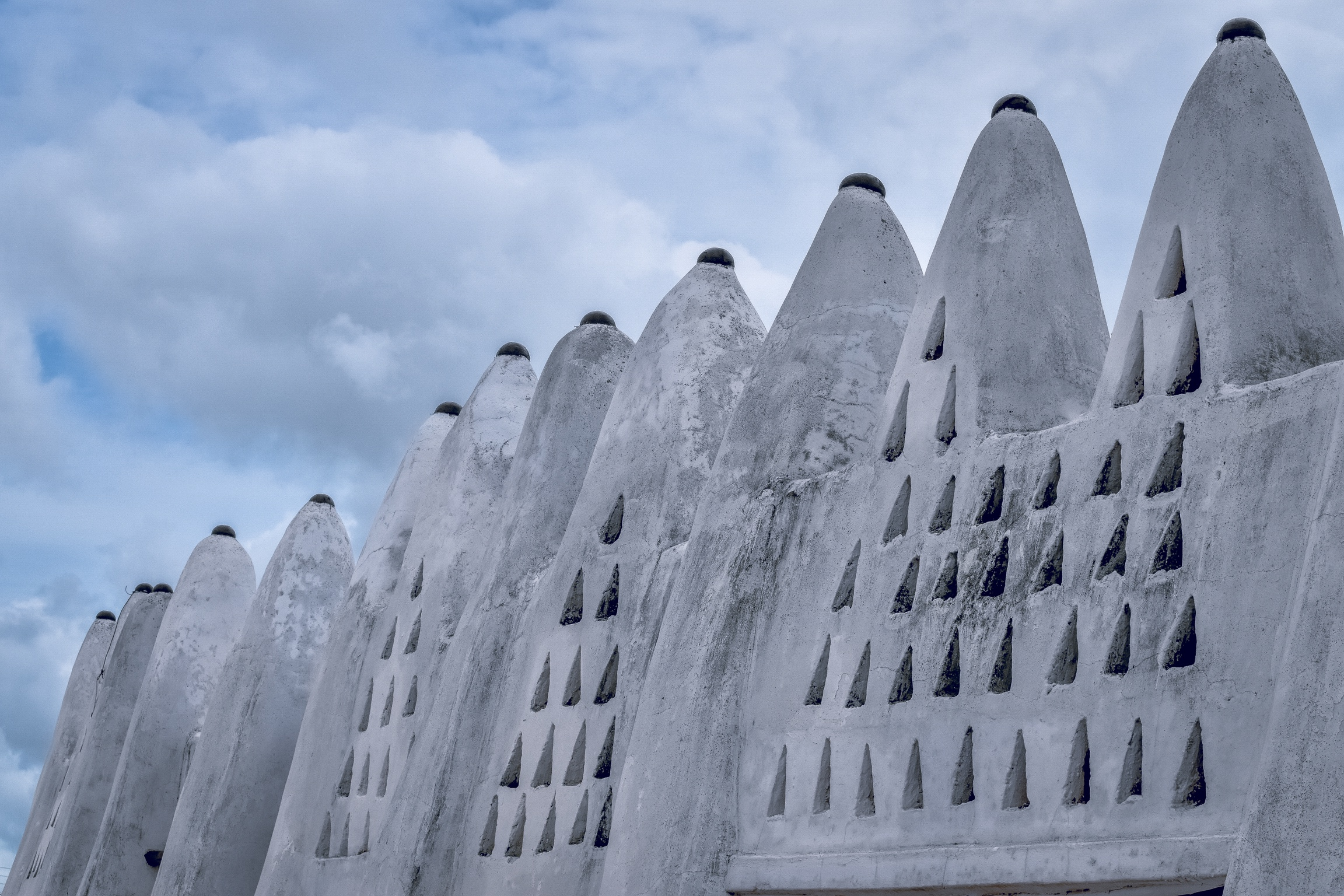
Front view of Wa Naa's Palace

The Wa Naa's Palace, located in Wa, is home to chief (Wa Naa) of the Wala people. Cattle is a symbol of wealth in the town and is sometimes used for marriage payment.

=== Festivals ===
The Damba festival is an annual event celebrated in the town and throughout Northern Ghana. It is typically held in late September. The Dumba festival is another annual event celebrated in the town. It is usually celebrated in the month of September or October.

== Human resources ==
=== Health ===
Wa has a total of 26 health facilities, including community health planning services and four private facilities. The largest hospital in the town is the Wa regional hospital. It is a 160-bed facility that opened in 2019 with a project cost of GH₵5,254,500,000 (US$339 million).

=== Education ===
The town is the educational hub of the region. University for Development Studies, Nusrat Jahan Ahmadiyya College of Education and Wa Polytechnic have branches or are located in Wa. The Wa Technical University, formerly Wa Polytechnic, was established in 1999 and begin program offerings in 2004. There are currently 600 students enrolled in the institution.

The following is a list of educational institutions in Wa:

Senior high schools

- Wa Islamic Senior High School
- Jamiat Al-Hidayyat Al-Islamiat Girls Senior High School
- Northern Star Senior High School
- St. Francis Xavier Minor Seminary
- Wa Senior High School
- Wa Senior High Technical School
- Wa Technical Institute
- T. I. Ahmadiyya Senior High School

Colleges/Universities

- SD Dombo University of Business and Integrated Development Studies
- Nusrat Jahan Ahmadiyya College of Education
- Wa Nursing Training College
- Wa Technical University (formally Wa Polytechnic)

== Notable people ==
- Wiyaala
- Samini
- Mohammed Kudus
- Abdul-Rashid Pelpuo
- Salma Mumin
- Abdul Haye Mumin
- Shamima Muslim
- Mahmud Khalid

== See also ==
- Lobi people
- Wala people
- Roman Catholic Diocese of Wa
