= Mahmud Khalid =

Ghanaian politician

Upper West Regional Minister
- In office 2009–2010
- President: John Atta Mills
- Preceded by: George Hikah Benson
- Succeeded by: Isaaku Saliah
- Constituency: Wa Central Constituency

Personal details
- Born: Khalid Wa, Upper West Region
- Party: National Democratic Congress
- Children: 3
- Profession: Teacher and Politician

Mahmud Khalid is a Ghanaian politician and a former Minister of State. He is a member of the National Democratic Congress (Ghana) of Ghana. He served briefly as the Minister for the Upper West Region in the Mills government.

While he was in office, allegations of bias towards Ahmadi Muslims. Due to this, on 11 May 2010, he was dismissed by the President of Ghana, John Atta Mills. Khalid suggested members of his party lobbied for his dismissal. Alhaji Issaku Saliah, a former MP for Wa East was nominated as his replacement and approved by parliament on 23 July 2010.

== See also ==
- List of Mills government ministers
- National Democratic Congress (Ghana)

Political offices
Preceded by George Hikah Benson	Upper West Regional Minister; 2009 – 2010	Succeeded by Isaaku Saliah
