= Aqsa Mosque, Rabwah =

Mosque in Rabwah, Punjab, Pakistan

Aqsa Mosque
- مسجدِ اقصیٰ
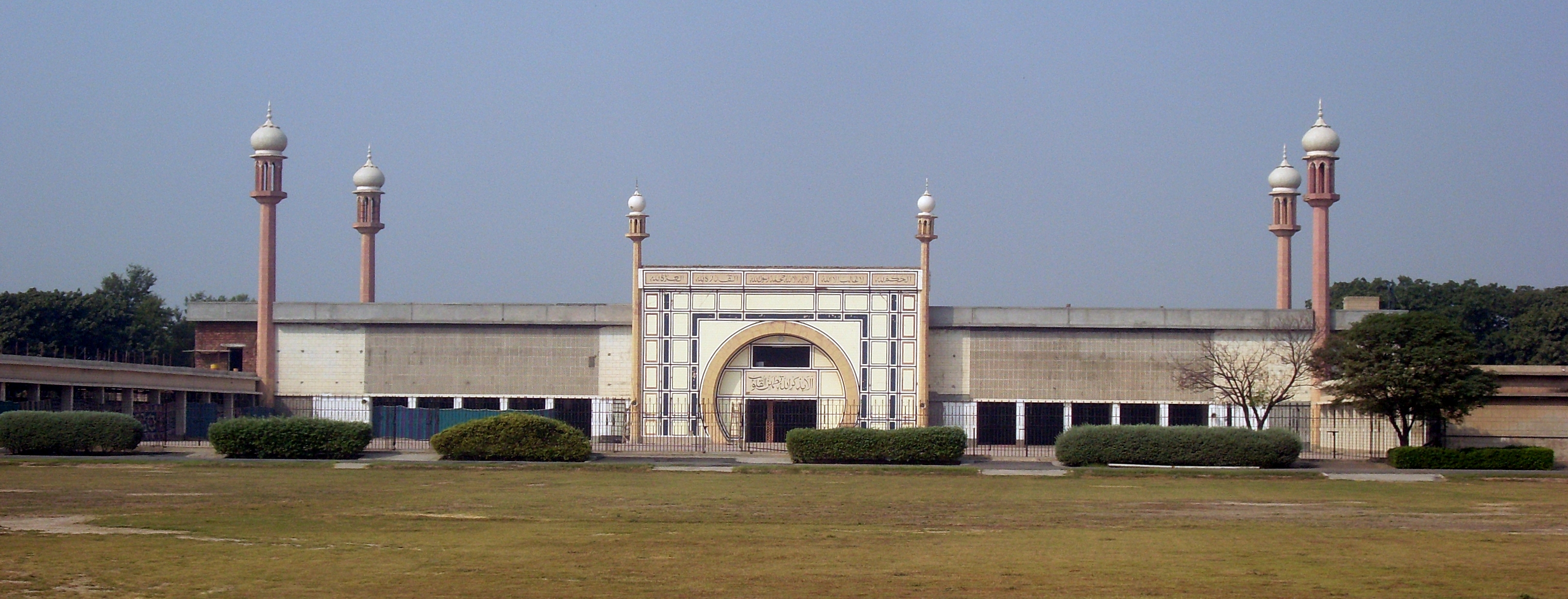

- Location within Punjab, Pakistan

Religion
- Affiliation: Islam
- Branch/tradition: Ahmadiyya

Location
- Location: Rabwah, Punjab
- Country: Pakistan
- Coordinates: 31°45′6″N 72°54′38″E

Architecture
- Architects: Abdul Rashid and Aziz Malik
- Type: mosque
- Style: Mughal
- Completed: 1972
- Construction cost: 1.5 million Rupees

Specifications
- Capacity: 20,000 worshipers
- Minaret: 6
- Minaret height: 20 meters, 12 meters
- Site area: 1.6 acres (6,500 m^{2})

The Aqsa Mosque (Urdu: مسجدِ اقصیٰ, romanized: Masjid-i Aqsa) in Rabwah is the main and largest mosque of the Ahmadiyya Muslim Community in Pakistan. Its foundation stone was laid down in 1966. The mosque was inaugurated on 31 March 1972 by the head of the worldwide community, Mirza Nasir Ahmad. The building can accommodate up to 20,000 worshippers.

== History ==
=== Construction ===
In 1964, it was decided that a jama masjid should be built in Rabwah as the capacity of the previous mosque (Masjid Mubarak) became insufficient. A donation appeal was launched on 7 July 1964 in Al-Fazl newspaper. The necessary funds were collected already on 21 July and appeal was stopped. The foundation stone, originated from the Aqsa Mosque in Qadian, was laid on 28 October 1966 by Mirza Nasir Ahmad in a ceremony attended by 5,000 guests.

== Architecture ==
The design was prepared by Abdul Rashid, at the behest of Mirza Basheer-ud-Din Mahmood Ahmad who was the caliph of the Ahmadiyya Muslim Community at the time. The construction blueprint was already prepared during his lifetime, but the foundation could not be laid down by him due to the Indo-Pakistani War of 1965. The column-free main hall is 1,640 square meter and courtyard is 4,520 square meter in size. The design was said to be inspired by the Badshahi Mosque and Jama Masjid, Delhi. Together with the 6,500 m^{2} large compound, the mosque can accommodate up to 20,000 worshippers. The mosque has a total of 6 minarets, four of which are about 20 m and two are 12 m high.

The construction of the mosque cost approximately 1.5 million Rupees, most of which was borne by Muhammad Siddique Bani, on his request, his name was not published till his death. After his demise, the rest of the cost was paid by Sheikh Abdul Majeed.

== Security ==
On 26 April 1984, Pakistan passed an Ordinance XX and the head of worldwide Ahmadiyya Muslim Community, Mirza Tahir Ahmad, migrated to London. Due to security concerns and persecution of Ahmadis in Pakistan, a boundary wall was built around the mosque premises. The construction started in July 1987 and was completed by February 1989.

== See also ==
- Nusrat Jehan Academy
