= Ahmadiyya in Spain =

Islamic movement

Ahmadiyya is an Islamic branch in Spain, under the spiritual leadership of the caliph in London. The earliest history of the Community in Spain dates back to the period of the Second Caliph, when Malik Mohammad Sharid Gujrati, a missionary of the Community, arrived in Madrid on March 10, 1936. However, in the same year the Spanish Civil War broke out forcing Gujrati to abandon the country. Missionary efforts commenced once again following the Second World War, in 1946 when Karam Ilahi Zafar was sent by the caliph. The Basharat Mosque in Pedro Abad, built by the Ahmadiyya in the 1980s is the first mosque to be built in Spain since the Fall of Granada and the end of Muslim rule at the end of the 15th century. Today there are two purpose-built Ahmadi Muslim mosques and roughly 500 adherents in Spain.

== History ==
=== Early contact ===
In the 1930s, during the era of the Second Caliphate, Malik Mohammad Sharid Gujrati arrived in Madrid on March 10, 1936. A Community consisting of five Ahmadi Muslims was said to have been established, among whom the first convert was Count Antonio Logothete. He later adopted the name Ghulam Ahmad and his wife adopted the name Amina. That year the Spanish Civil War broke out between the Republicans, the Second Spanish Republic, and the Nationalists. As a consequence Gujrati had to leave the country and the Community became dormant.

=== Establishment ===
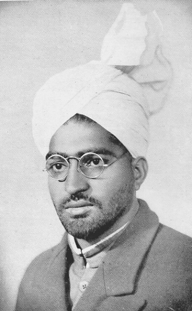
Karam Ilahi Zafar, the first longterm missionary in Spain

Several years after the Civil War, missionary efforts commenced once again. In 1945, following the Second World War, Mirza Basheer-ud-Din Mahmood Ahmad, the Second Caliph, summoned a meeting for a batch of missionaries to be sent to Europe. Though not originally intended, Karam Ilali Zafar was appointed for a mission in Spain. The caravan departed in 1945 from the headquarters of the Ahmadiyya Muslim Community, Qadian towards Bombay harbour, via New Delhi. The group embarked on SS Batory and after three weeks landed in Liverpool where they confronted Jalal al-Din Shams, then a pioneering missionary stationed in England. The caravan spent six months in London at the Fazl Mosque. On June 24, 1946, Karam Ilali Zafar arrived in Madrid through the French port of Hendaye.

Zafar studied Spanish for six months before he was able to preach to the people of Spain. A noted early convert of this period was Enrique Ku Zhin, an ethnic Russian translator who adopted the name Muhammad Ahmad. A year later, in 1947, the Indian subcontinent was facing a partition. Subsequently, the Ahmadiyya Muslim Community, then headquartered in Qadian, India, had to be relocated to the newly created Pakistan. Since the Community was primarily concentrated in the Subcontinent during the 1940s, it was facing severe financial difficulties. As a result, the caliph requested many of the missionaries who were then stationed in Europe, to return home. Zafar, having read the message from the caliph, wrote back to him requesting permission to continue to work, but as a self-financed missionary. After receiving permission from the caliph, Zafar worked as a street vendor selling homemade perfumes, primarily in El Rastro an open-air market in Madrid. He often used his stalls as opportunity to introduce the Islamic faith. For example, he reportedly used to chant, "Huelan esta fragancia tan agradable, sin embargo esta fragancia no durará mucho tiempo entre vosotros, pero yo conozco un aroma que es permanente y eterno. Si lo desean, pueden tomar mi tarjeta y contactarme", meaning that the pleasant fragrance that he is selling does not last long, but there is a scent that is permanent and eternal, i.e. Islamic teachings. Under the rule of Francisco Franco, non-catholic missionary work was banned and as a result Zafar faced several arrests by the state police. Often his perfume stall was subject to vandalism from members of the general public. In spite of this he managed to publish a number of books into Spanish during the Franco era, including Estructura económica de la sociedad islámica (Islamic Economic system) and La filosofía de las enseñanzas del islam a translation of a book by Ahmad, The Philosophy of the Teachings of Islam.

In 1969, Zafar wrote a letter to Francisco Franco, the dictator of Spain, about Islam and the claims of Ahmad. The letter discussed eight points with reference to the prevailing Catholic beliefs, including the Islamic teaching on the Unity of God, the status of Muhammad as a prophet, and a number of basic Quranic injunctions. The letter also discussed the Ahmadi belief concerning the survival of Jesus from the Cross and his eventual journey towards India, and also the claims of Ahmad as the spiritual return of Christ. On December 24, 1969, Felipe Polo Martínez Valdés, the secretary to Franco returned his gratitude for the letter.

Two years later, in 1971, following the democratic transition in the 1960s and the 1970s, offering greater religious freedom, the Ahmadiyya Muslim Community was finally able to register as a non-Catholic religious organization. The Community was registered as La Misión Ahmadia del Islam.

=== Journeys by caliphs ===
Locations of the two purpose-built mosques in Spain. One was inaugurated by Caliph IV and the other by Caliph V

Following the democratic transition in the 1970s, offering greater religious freedom, the Community under the directions of Caliph III stepped up efforts to proselytize and began to search for a plot of land to build a mosque. On October 9, 1980, the caliph laid the foundation stone for the mosque in Pedro Abad, northeast of Córdoba, to which he gave the name "Basharat Mosque". It was the first time in the history of Ahmadiyya that an Ahmadi caliph had visited Spain. Most notably, it was also in this occasion of the ceremony that the caliph coined the motto of the Community, "Love for All, Hatred for None". This was also the caliph's final journey to Spain.

In 1982, just a few months into his caliphate, Caliph IV landed in Spain to inaugurate the Basharat Mosque. Over 3,000 guests from various countries attended the opening ceremony on September 10, 1982, including a number of public figures, such as the former president of UN General Assembly, Muhammad Zafarullah Khan, Nobel Prize winner Abdus Salam and a vicar representing the bishop of the Roman Catholic Diocese of Córdoba. Built at a cost of 30 million pesetas, the mosque is the first purpose-built mosque since the expulsion of Muslims from Spain. Karam Ilali Zafar, then still a missionary in Spain, was sent to Granada, Andalusia, in 1982. After spending five years he was transferred to Portugal in 1987 where he spent nine years. He then returned to Granada and after serving almost 60 years, mostly in Spain, he died in 1996. He is buried in a cemetery in Pedro Abad.

On his first visit to Spain, Caliph V urged local Ahmadis to make special effort to convey the teachings of Islam and Ahmadiyya to the people of Spain. On March 26, 2013, the caliph arrived for another visit in order to inaugurate another mosque of the Ahmadiyya Muslim Community, in Valencia to which he gave the name Baitur Rahman Mosque. Built at a cost of 1.2 million euros, the mosque can support up to 750 worshippers.

== Demographics ==
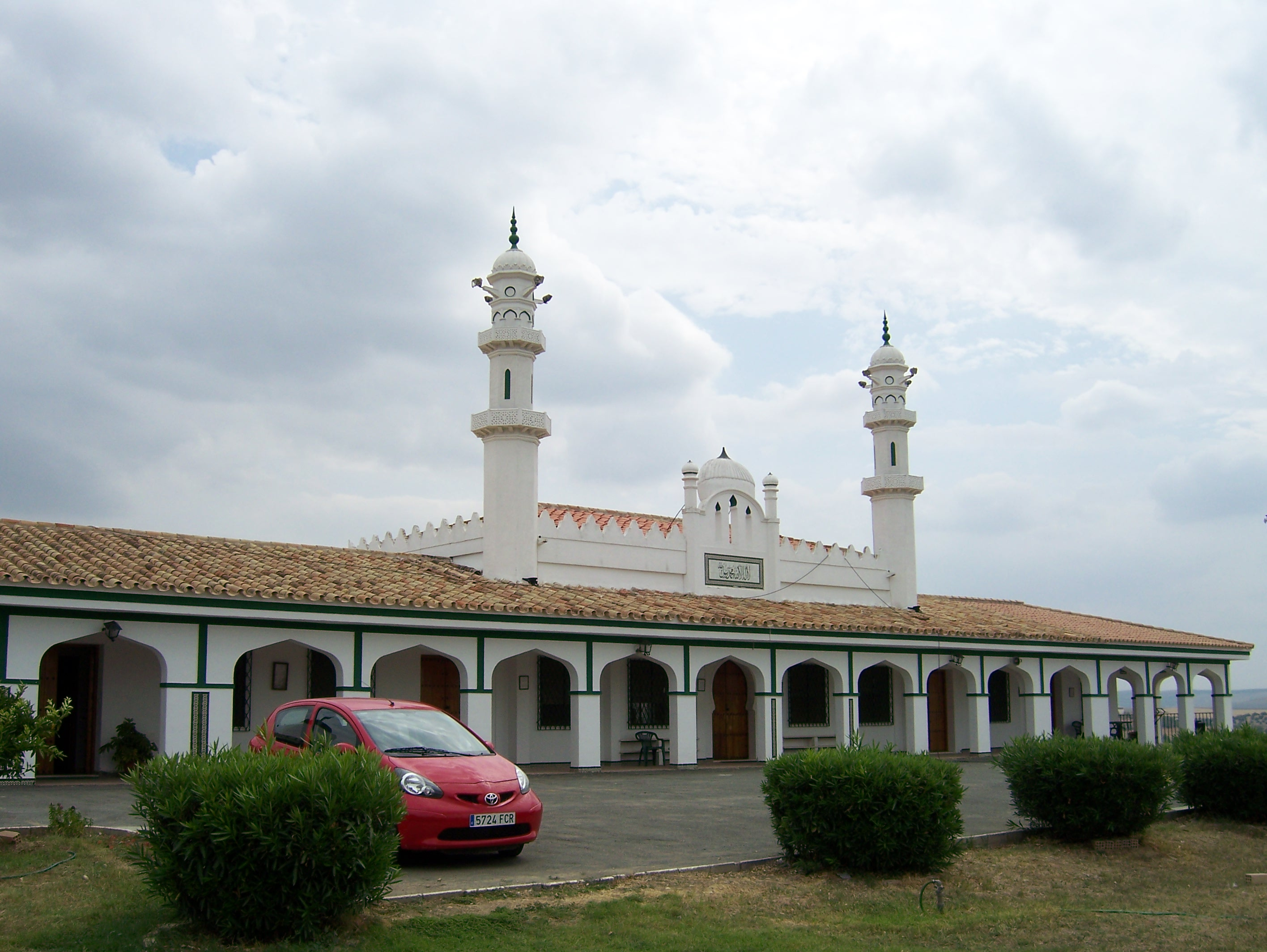
Basharat Mosque is the first purpose-built mosque in Spain for over 500 years.

During the 1930s, when Malik Mohammad Sharid Gujrati arrived in Spain a community consisting of five Ahmadi Muslims was said to have been established. During the early period of Karam Ilali Zafar's ministry in the late 1940s, Ahmadi Muslims were largely concentrated in Madrid and Barcelona. After more than 30 years, the Community had not grown significantly. By the 1970s, there were an estimated 30 Spaniards who had converted to the faith. Today, the Community is established in 13 towns and cities across Spain. In particular, Ahmadi Muslims maintain a presence in Madrid, Barcelona, Valencia, Logroño and a number of towns and cities across the autonomous community of Andalusia. In Andalusia, there are approximately 100 Ahmadi Muslims. Whilst this primarily consists of immigrant populations from Pakistan, there are a few dozen Spaniards. There are roughly 500 Ahmadi Muslim across Spain.

There are two purpose-built mosques; Basharat Mosque in Pedro Abad, northeast of Córdoba and the Baitur Rahman Mosque in La Pobla de Vallbona, northwest of Valencia. The Basharat Mosque is the first purpose-built mosque since the expulsion of Muslims from Spain.

== See also ==
- Islam in Spain
