= Nusrat Jehan Academy =

Danish Malik(10A)
- نصرت جہاں سکولز
- Rabwah, Punjab; Pakistan

Information
- Type: Private
- Motto: علم و عمل
- Founded: 1987; 39 years ago
- Authority: Nazarat Taleem Sadr Anjuman Ahmadiyya Pakistan
- Language: English, Urdu
- Colours: White and grey
- Publication: The Avante-Garde Magazine,نامود اردو,فانوس
- Affiliation: Aga Khan University Examination Board
- Website: nusratjehan.com

Nusrat Jahan Schools (نصرت جہان سکولز) are a group of non-profit, private, educational institutions in Rabwah (ربوہ), a town in district Chiniot (چنیوٹ), in the province of Punjab. They are owned by the Ahmadiyya Muslim Community and are operated by the Nazarat Taleem Sadr Anjuman Ahmadiyya Pakistan (نظارت تعلیم صدر انجمن احمدیہ پاکستان). These schools were established under and named after the Nusrat Jahan Scheme; a scheme launched by the community for the educational betterment of its members. These institutions offer programmes of primary, secondary, higher secondary and undergraduate and postgraduate education. Majority of the students enrolled in these schools are Ahmadi Muslims, mostly the residents of Rabwah though these institutions are not exclusively for Ahmadi Muslims and also enroll non-Ahmadi students from Rabwah and its surrounding areas.

== History ==
The first educational institution to be established under the Nusrat Jahan Scheme was named Nusrat Jahan Academy. It was founded in the year 1987 at Darul Rehmat East, adjacent to the Aqsa Mosque. The Nusrat Jahan Academy had one campus partitioned into two sections; one for boys and the other for girls. The medium of instruction at Nusrat Jahan Academy was Urdu in the four years after its inception.

In 1991, English medium of instruction was introduced at the Nusrat Jahan Academy. For this purpose, both sections of the school were further divided into Urdu and English medium sections. Higher secondary education was later introduced in the section for boys and hence the name of the school was changed to Nusrat Jahan Academy and Inter College.

In 2005, a new campus called Nusrat Jahan Academy Urdu Medium Boys was established at Darul Nasr West, to provide secondary education exclusively to boys. The medium of instruction at this school was Urdu. The Urdu medium sections at the Darul Rehmat East campus were then abolished.

In September 2011, Nusrat Jahan College was established to provide higher secondary and higher education to young men and women.

For the next two years it provided higher education exclusively to women; until September 2014. Classes for the undergraduate programmes were taught in evening in the Nusrat Jahan Academy Girls School campus.

In August 2013, a separate building for the Nusrat Jahan Girls College was put into operation.

In September 2014, following certain changes in the national educational policy of the Government of Pakistan, Nusrat Jahan Academy Urdu medium boys was abolished which gave way to Nusrat Jahan Boys College. It was established at the Darul Nasr West campus.

== Nusrat Jahan Academy ==
Nusrat Jahan Academy (NJA) was established in 1987. It has separate campuses for boys and girls. It has an estimated worth of 7 million Pakistani Rupees.

=== Nusrat Jahan Academy Boys School ===
Nusrat Jehan Academy Boys School is an all boys high school. It provides secondary education to boys. The medium of instruction at Nusrat Jehan Academy Boys School is English. It is located in Darul Rehmat East; adjacent to the Aqsa Mosque. It was established in the year 1991 but became a separate English medium school in 2005. Currently more than 700 students are enrolled in the Nusrat Jehan Academy Boys School.

=== Nusrat Jahan Academy Girls School ===
Nusrat Jahan Academy Girls School provides primary and secondary education to girls and primary education to boys. It is located adjacent to the Nusrat Jahan Academy Boys school in Darul Rehmat East. It was established in the year 1991. Nusrat Jehan Academy Girls School has more than 700 students enrolled. At present.it is one of the best schools in city.

== Nusrat Jahan College ==
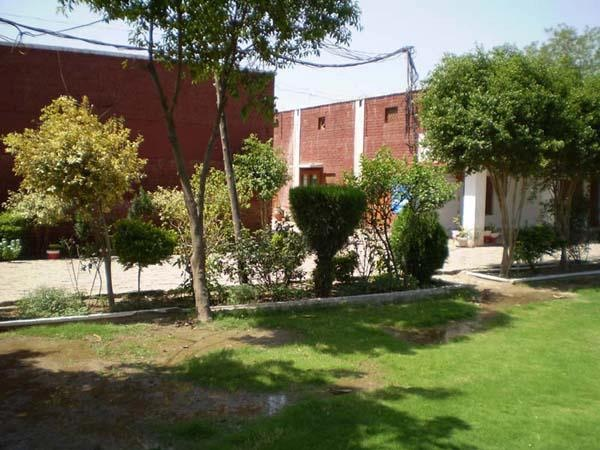
Nusrat Jahan Academy Boys High School

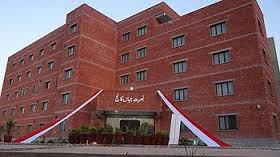
Nusrat Jahan College

Nusrat Jahan College (NJC) was established in September 2011. It has separate campuses for boys and girls.

=== Nusrat Jahan Boys College ===
Nusrat Jehan Boys College (NJBC) is an all boys college located in Darul Nasr West, Rabwah. It provides higher secondary education to boys. It also offers a number of undergraduate programmes. For this purpose it is affiliated with University of the Punjab. Efforts to affiliate NJBC with University of the Sargodha are underway. Publications : The Avant Garde Magazine

=== Nusrat Jahan Girls College ===
Nusrat Jahan Girls College is located in Central Darul Rehmat. It is dedicated to providing higher secondary and higher education to girls and young women. It offers undergraduate and postgraduate programmes, for which it is affiliated with the University of the Punjab and University of Sargodha. It has 1495 students.

== Affiliation with Aga Khan University Examination Board ==
Nusrat Jahan Academy Boys School and Nusrat Jahan Academy Girls School were affiliated with the Board of Intermediate and Secondary Education (BISE) Faisalabad since their inception, up until the year 2011. Students of classes nine, ten, eleven and twelve would write an annual examination conducted by the Board of Intermediate and Secondary Education Faisalabad. Whereas students of classes five and eight would write an annual, external examination conducted by the Punjab Education Commission (PEC).In February 2011, the PEC issued admit cards for the students writing these exams but the admit card of every student of these two schools said 'non-Muslim' as opposed to 'Ahmadi' as their religion.

This blatant violation of the terms of their contract impelled the Sadr Anjuman Ahmadiyya Pakistan (صدر انجمن احمدیہ پاکستان)— the central governing council of the Ahmadiyya Muslim Community— to terminate all affiliations between all Nusrat Jahan Schools and BISE, Faisalabad and PEC.

These schools were then affiliated with the Aga Khan University Examination Board (AKU-EB) in March and April 2011. Aga Khan University Examination Board is a private examination board founded by the Aga Khan University in Karachi. AKU-EB has no history of religious intolerance or sectarian persecution.

Students of Secondary School Certificate (SSC) and Higher Secondary School Certificate (HSSC) write the AKU-EB examinations in April and May every year. Supplementary and improvement examinations are held in the month of September every year.

== Major events ==
- جلسہ سیرت النبی

All teachers and most students at Nusrat Jahan Schools are Ahmadi Muslims and as dictated by their religious beliefs سیرت النبی programmes are held on Rabbee ul avval 12, every year.

- Exhibitions

Exhibitions including book exhibitions are held from time to time in Nusrat Jahan Academy Boys School and Nusrat Jahan Academy Girls School. These are arranged by students in collaboration with their teachers.

- Prize distribution ceremonies

Prize distribution ceremonies are held at the Nusrat Jahan Academy Boys School and Nusrat Jahan Academy Girls School on an annual basis to acknowledge the achievements of those students who stand at the top three positions in their class in annual or term examinations conducted by the schools every year.

== Extra-curricular activities ==
- Sports and Games

Sports and Games including Cricket, Football, Badminton tournaments and athletic competitions are arranged within and between schools on an annual basis.

- Competitions

Competitions of various kinds are held every year in these schools. These include competitions of Tilawat e Qur'an (تلاوت قرآن کریم), English speech, extempore speech, Bai'at baazi (بیعت بازی), Urdu speech, nazm khuwani (of selected verses from the works of Hadhrat Masseh e mau'ood and other poets of the community), essay writing and quizzes of different types.

== Facilities ==
Nusrat Jahan Academy Boys School, Nusrat Jahan Academy Girls School and Nusrat Jahan Boys College are functioning in buildings owned by a separate organisation of the Ahmadiyya Muslim Community: Jalsa Salana Rabwah (جلسہ سالانہ ربوہ). Furthermore, all Nusrat Jahan Schools are non-profit organisations that take nominal fees for the services they provide. This puts a limit to the facilities that they can provide. However, all these institutions are equipped with basic educational facilities such as libraries and science laboratories including laboratories for Physics, Chemistry, Biology and Computer Science.
