= Mirza Nasir Ahmad =

Ahmadiyya religious leader (1909–1982)

- مرزا ناصر احمد
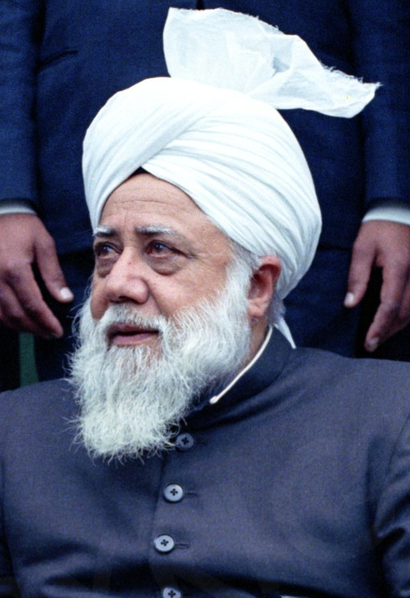
- Mirza Nasir Ahmad in 1967

Personal life
- Born: 16 November 1909 Qadian, Punjab, British India
- Died: 9 June 1982 (aged 72) Islamabad, Pakistan
- Resting place: Bahishti Maqbara, Rabwah, Pakistan
- Spouse: Mansoora Begum (m. 1934 – d. 1981); Tahira Siddiqua Nasir (m. 1982)
- Parents: Mirza Basheer-ud-Din Mahmood Ahmad (father); Mahmooda Begum (mother)
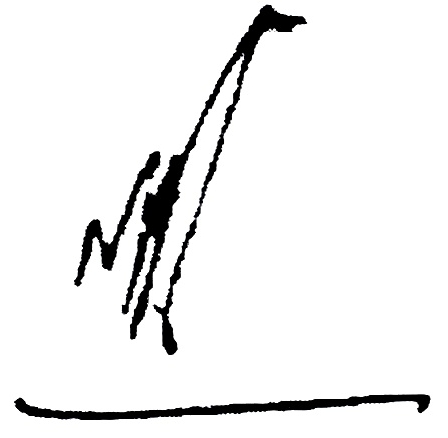
- Signature

Religious life
- Religion: Ahmadiyya Islam
- Consecration: 8 November 1965

Senior posting
- Post: Caliph
- Predecessor: Mirza Basheer-ud-Din Mahmood Ahmad
- Successor: Mirza Tahir Ahmad

Mirza Nasir Ahmad (مرزا ناصر احمد; 16 November 1909 – 9 June 1982) was the third Caliph (Arabic: خليفة المسيح الثالث, romanized: khalīfatul masīh al-Thālith) of the Ahmadiyya Muslim Community from Pakistan. He was elected as the third successor of Mirza Ghulam Ahmad on 8 November 1965, the day after the death of his predecessor and father, Mirza Basheer-ud-Din Mahmood Ahmad.

Under his leadership, there was further expansion of missionary work started by his predecessor the second caliph, particularly in Africa and Europe. In 1974, he represented the Ahmadiyya Community in the National Assembly of Pakistan in an eleven-day inquisition. Despite his efforts, the National Assembly declared Ahmadis to be non-Muslims and he led the Community through this period of increased hostility and government repression. The 'Nusrat Jehan Scheme', a scheme dedicated to serving parts of Africa by running numerous medical clinics and schools was one of the many outcomes of his 1970 tour of West Africa, the first visit to the continent made by an Ahmadi caliph. In 1980, Nasir Ahmad traveled to Spain, where he laid the foundation stone of the Basharat Mosque in Pedro Abad and announced "Love for All, Hatred for None" as the community's motto. The mosque was inaugurated posthumously in 1982 and was the first purpose-built mosque in Spain since the Reconquista and the Fall of Granada in 1492.

Nasir Ahmad also orchestrated the compilation and arrangement of Ghulam Ahmad's literary output. The writings of Ghulam Ahmad, which had hitherto been published as individual books, pamphlets or articles were compiled in the twenty-three volume corpus known as Rūhānī Khazā᾽in (Spiritual Treasures). His sayings and discourses were collected in the ten volume Malfūzāt (spoken words) and his announcements and advertisements were published in three volumes under the title of Majmu'a Ishtihārāt (Collection of Flyers or Posters).

== Early life ==
Mirza Nasir Ahmad was born in Qadian, India on 16 November 1909. His early education was both religious and secular. By the age of thirteen, with guidance from his father Mirza Basheer-ud-Din Mahmood Ahmad, Nasir Ahmad had committed all 114 chapters of the Qur’an to memory, making him a Hafiz. His father placed great emphasis on the acquisition of religious education. In pursuit of that goal, Nasir Ahmad was enrolled at the Madrassa Ahmadiyya, Qadian, graduated with honors in July 1929. After graduation, he went through his post-secondary education and by 1934, obtained his Bachelor of Arts Degree from the Government College, Lahore.

On 5 August 1934, Nasir Ahmad married Syeda Mansoora Begum, a granddaughter of Mirza Ghulam Ahmad and eldest daughter of Nawab Muhammad Ali Khan of Malerkotla, India. Within a month of getting married, Nasir Ahmad left India and proceeded for postgraduate studies to England.

In England, he obtained Masters of Arts degree in the Tripos (P.P.E.) Political Science, Philosophy and Economics from Balliol College, University of Oxford. He impressed his college professors as a very well-behaved and deep-thinking student. During a subsequent visit to England, he met one of his former professors who welcomed him to his residence. The professor told other members of the Community that he had seen signs of leadership in Nasir Ahmad and was certain that he would be a leader one day.

Before returning to India he visited Egypt for three months from July to November 1938 in order to improve his Arabic and to meet up with his brother Mirza Mubarik Ahmad to analyse the progress of the Community in Cairo. During his stay, he also visited numerous sites of historical interest.

=== Career under Basheer-ud-din Mahmood Ahmad's leadership ===
In November 1938, he returned to the town of his birth, Qadian, where he was appointed a professor at Jamia Ahmadiyya, the missionary theological training college of the Ahmadiyya Muslim Community. In 1939, he was appointed principal where he remained for five years. From May 1944 to November 1965, he was principal of the Talim-ul-Islam College, first in Qadian, then after partition, in Rabwah, Pakistan.

During the anti-Ahmadiyya riots in 1953, Nasir Ahmad was imprisoned briefly but released on 28 May 1953. Upon his release, he served in various other offices of the community, until being elected as Khalifatul Masih after the demise of his father, Khalifatul Masih II.

== Leadership ==
Mirza Nasir Ahmad was elected as Khalifatul Masih III on 9 November 1965, shortly after Isha prayer at Mubarak Mosque in Rabwah, Pakistan. The Majlis Intikhab Khilafat (Electoral College) was presided by Mirza Aziz Ahmad.

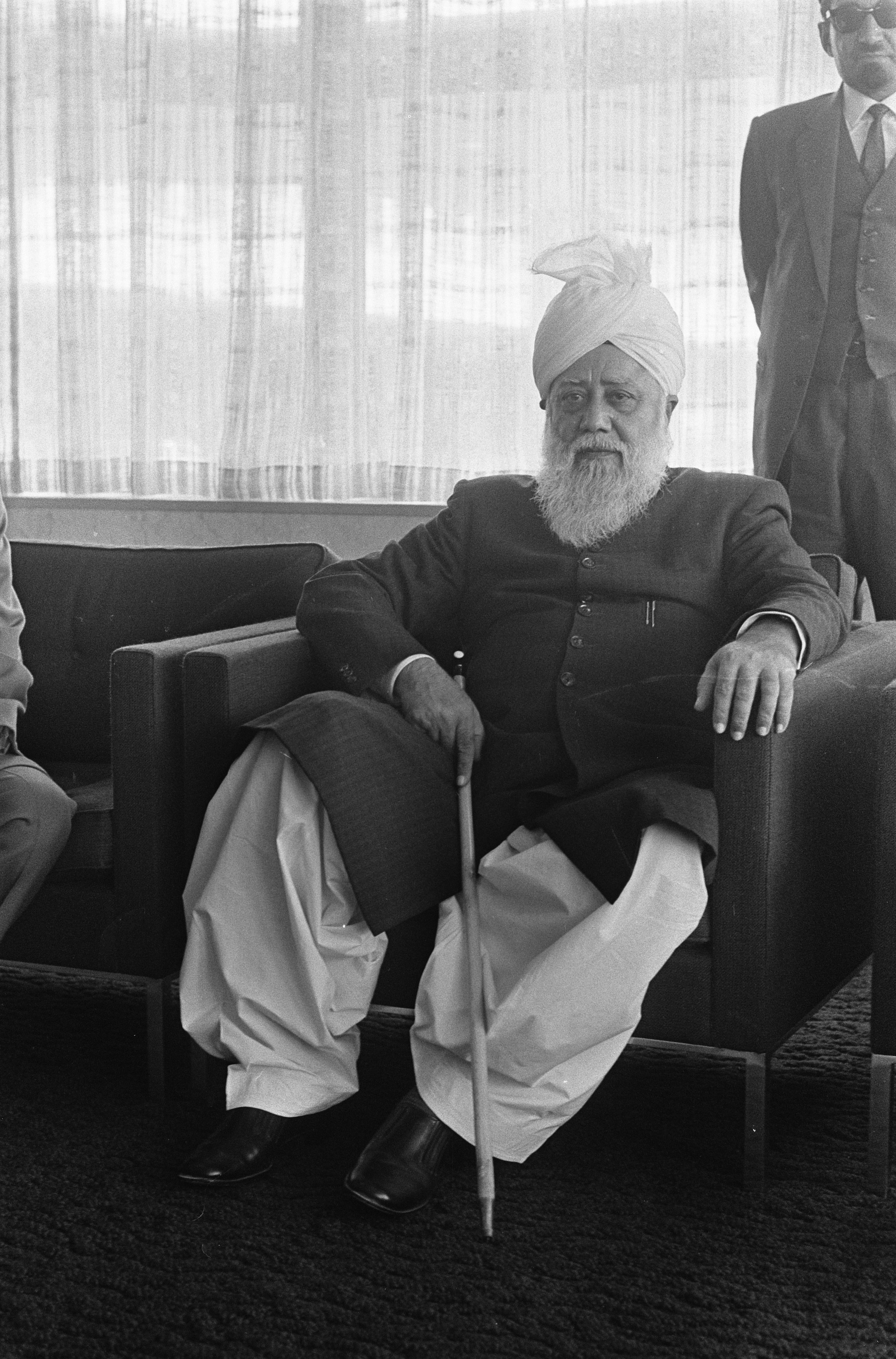
Nasir Ahmad pictured at Schipol Airport in 1967 during his early Europe trip.

Shortly after his election as Khalifatul Masih, he established the Fazl-e-Umar Foundation in honour and memory of Khalifatul Masih II Mirza Basheer-ud-Din Mahmood Ahmad. One of the projects envisioned by the foundation was the construction of a library. In 1971, the Khilafat Library in Rabwah was inaugurated, which today houses over 100,000 books, rare manuscripts, a children's section and science displays.

=== Africa ===
In 1970, Khalifatul Masih III embarked on a nine-week tour of various African countries. During his visit, he attended numerous receptions held in his honour and inspected the educational, social as well as spiritual services rendered by the Ahmadiyya Muslim Community of various African countries. He started the Nusrat Jehan scheme and appealed for financial contributions from the community. Under this scheme, Ahmadi doctors and teachers are serving in various parts of Africa by running numerous medical clinics and secondary schools.

=== Ahmadiyya and the National Assembly of Pakistan ===
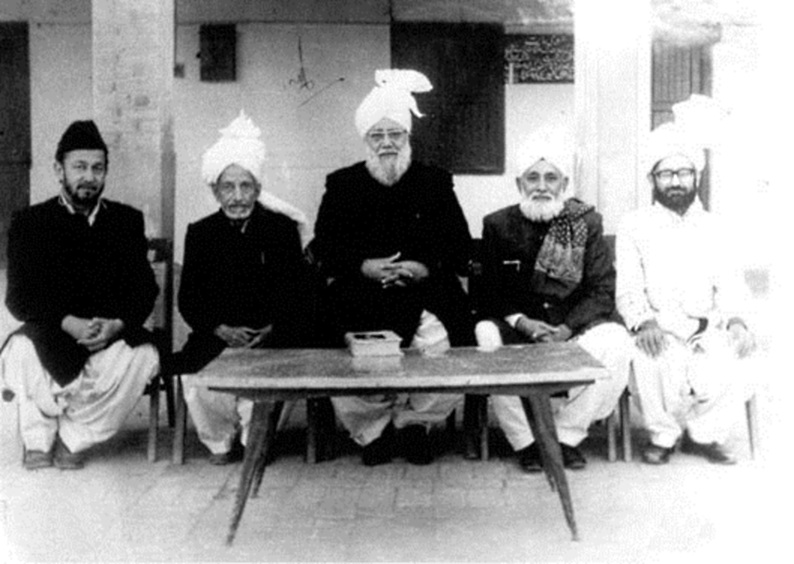
Representatives of the Ahmadiyya Community in Pakistan National Assembly. Pictured in 1974, Nasir Ahmad is sitten in the centre with Mirza Tahir Ahmad is sitten in the far left.

Following the riots and violence against Ahmadis in 1974, Prime Minister Zulfikar Ali Bhutto faced considerable pressure from religious leaders to declare the Ahmadis non-Muslim. Consequently, legislation and constitutional changes were enacted, Ahmadis were socially boycotted and their religious practices were criminalised by preventing them from claiming to be Muslims or from "behaving" as Muslims. Thereafter the Ahmadiyya Muslim Community faced an eleven-day inquisition where Mirza Nasir Ahmad himself and four other eminent Ahmadi scholars represented The Ahmadiyya Muslim community in the National Assembly of Pakistan. Mirza Nasir Ahmad personally answered all the allegations that were made against Ahmadiyya. Eventually Ahmadis were declared non-Muslim by the National Assembly of Pakistan.

=== London ===
In 1978, Mirza Nasir Ahmad traveled to London where the conference of Jesus' Deliverance from the cross was held at the Commonwealth Institute in Kensington. This was attended by various scholars belonging to principal faiths who read their papers discussing the circumstances surrounding the Crucifixion of Jesus, after which the Ahmadiyya viewpoint regarding the death of Jesus was presented. Presentations were also given by Sir Zafarullah Khan and M.M. Ahmad.

The Christian Church gave a statement dismissing the Ahmadiyya as not representing the teachings of Islam and refused to be drawn into the debate that had been re-opened by the discovery of the Shroud of Turin and now this conference. There were participants from Pakistan, India, Africa, Asia, Europe, and the United States. On this occasion, Nasir Ahmad also delivered a lecture on this issue. He dealt with the subject of Jesus' survival from death upon the cross, his travel to the east, the Unity of God, and expounded the status of Muhammad.

=== Compilation of Ahmadiyya texts ===
During his Caliphate, Mirza Nasir Ahmad is also known for having directed the compilation of the complete dreams, visions and verbal revelations claimed to have been received by Mirza Ghulam Ahmad, which had hitherto been published in various books of Ghulam Ahmad, as well as various journals and newspapers. The compiled version of his entire revelations was published in the form of the Tazkirah. The complete dialogues or utterances of Mirza Ghulam Ahmad were also compiled under the directives of Khalifatul Masih III. This was published in the form of the Malfoozat, which include his discourses, speeches, question and answer sessions, sermons and casual sayings.

=== Spain ===
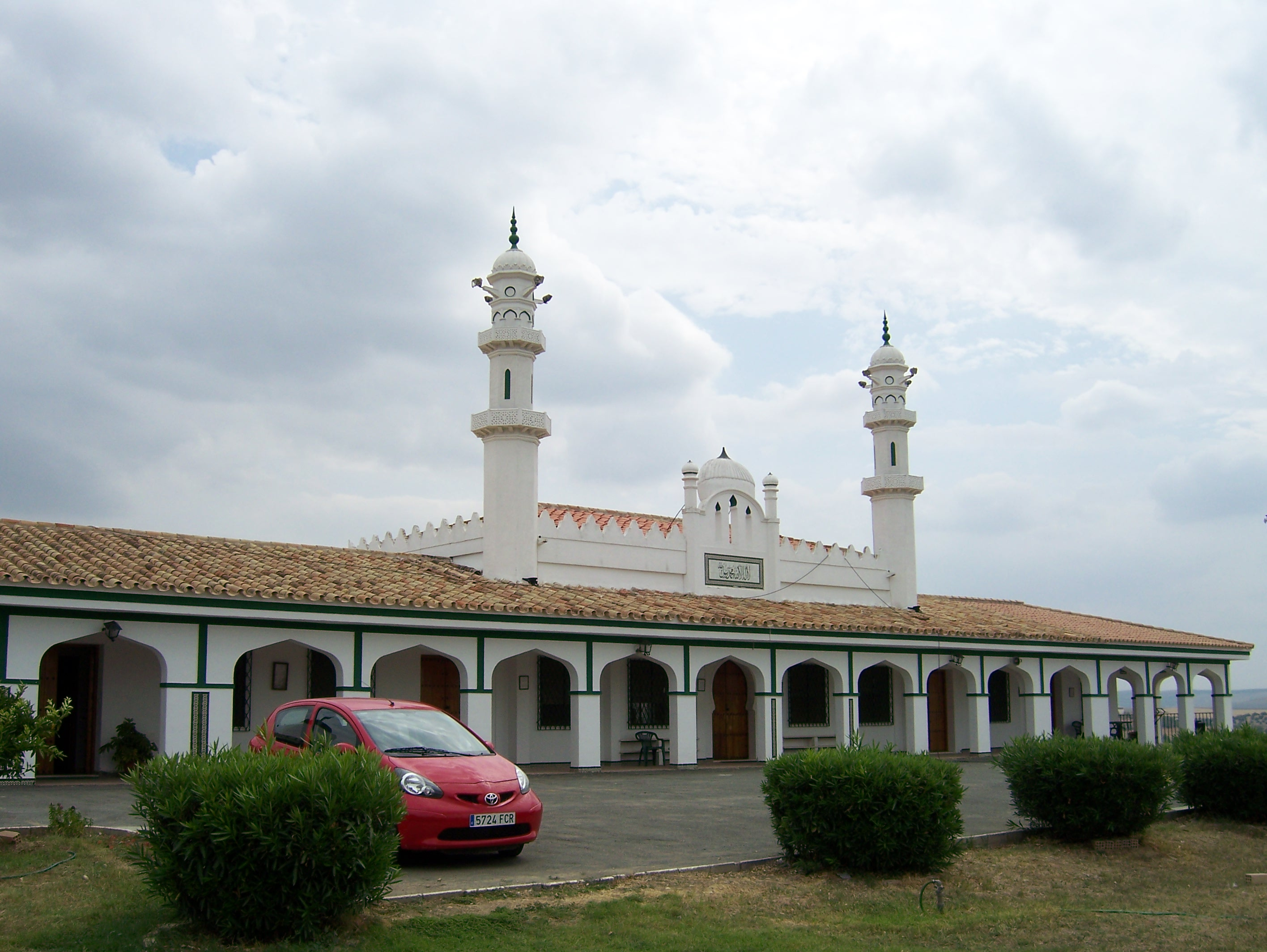
The Basharat Mosque in Pedro Abad, of the Ahmadiyya Muslim Community, was the first mosque to be built in modern Spain.

In 1980, Mirza Nasir Ahmad traveled to Spain, where he laid the foundation stone of the Basharat Mosque in Pedro Abad. This was the first mosque to be built in Spain in over 750 years. It was here he coined the motto "Love for All, Hatred for None". The construction of the mosque was not completed until after his death in 1982.

== Marriage, children, and family ==
Mirza Nasir Ahmad married Sayyidah Mansoora Begum on 5 August 1934. She was the daughter of Nawab Muhammad 'Ali Khan of Malerkotla and Nawab Mubarka Begum, the daughter of Mirza Ghulam Ahmad. They had five children together:

- son Mirza Anas Ahmad, (17 April 1937 – 18 December 2018).
- daughter Amatul Shakoor, (26 April 1940 – 3 September 2019).
- daughter Amatul Haleem, (born 29 January 1942).
- son Mirza Fareed Ahmad, (born 4 March 1951).
- son Mirza Luqman Ahmad, (born 9 November 1953).

Shortly after the death of his wife Mansoora Begum, Nasir Ahmad decided to remarry. On 11 April 1982, he married Tahira Siddiqua, daughter of Abdul Majeed Khan of Verowal. This marriage only lasted a few short months with the demise of Nasir Ahmad on 9 June 1982.

== Death ==
On 21 May 1982, Mirza Nasir Ahmad delivered his last Friday sermon in Rabwah. Two days later on 23 May, he left Rabwah for the Pakistani capital Islamabad, where he was taken ill on 26 May. In June 1982, Mirza Nasir Ahmad suffered a severe heart attack. He died on 9 June 1982 at 12:45 p.m. in the city's Baitul Fazl.

Mirza Nasir Ahmad's body was then taken to Rabwah. The next day, Mirza Tahir Ahmad, half-brother of Nasir Ahmad, was elected as the Khalifatul Masih IV. Tahir Ahmad led his predecessor's funeral prayers, which was participated by nearly a hundred thousand people. Mirza Nasir Ahmad was then buried in Bahishti Maqbara, a cemetery established by the Ahmadiyya Muslim Community.

== Bibliography ==
In his lifetime, especially during the caliphate, Nasir Ahmad gave many lectures or sermons, many of these were later published as books by the community. Many of these were translated into English, meanwhile, some were also translated into Bengali, German and other languages

| Title | First published (year) | ISBN |
|---|---|---|
| Ta'meere Baitullah ki Tayees Azimushshan Maqassed; Twenty-Three Great Objectives of Building the House of Allah (English Translation) | 1967 | 978-93-83882-91-5 (English) |
| Aaman ka Paygham aur Ek Harf-e-Intebah; A Message of Peace & a Word of Warning (English Translation) | 1967 | 978-93-83882-34-2 (Urdu); 978-81-7912-202-0 (English) |
| Khilafat and Mujadadiyyat (English) | | |
| Message of Love and Brotherhood to Africa (English) | 1970 | 1-85372-853-5 |
| Anwar-ul-Qur'an (lit. 'Lights of Qur'an') – Vol. 1, Vol. 2 & Vol. 3 | | |
| Khutbat-e-Nasir (Friday Sermons and Nikah Sermons | | |
