= Yadgaar Mosque =

Mosque in Rabwah, Punjab, Pakistan

Memorial Mosque
- بیتِ یادگار
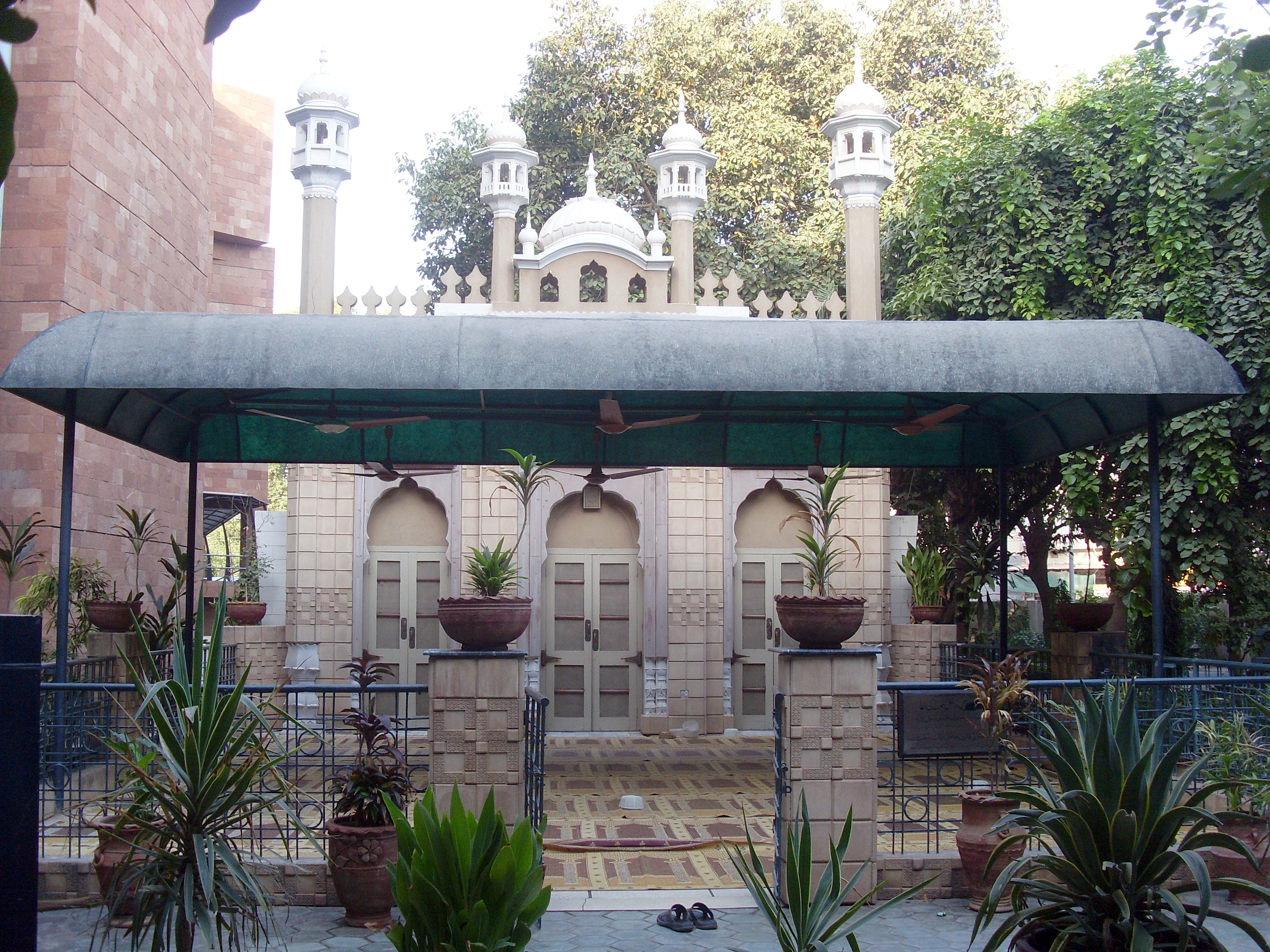

- Location of the mosque in Pakistan

Religion
- Affiliation: Islam
- Branch/tradition: Ahmadiyya
- Ecclesiastical or organizational status: Mosque
- Status: Active

Location
- Location: Rabwah, Chiniot, Punjab
- Country: Pakistan
- Interactive map of Memorial Mosque
- Coordinates: 31°45′31″N 72°55′00″E

Architecture
- Type: Mosque architecture

Specifications
- Dome: 2
- Minaret: 4

The Memorial Mosque or Yādgār Masjid (Urdu: یاد گار مسجد, romanized: yādgār masjid), commonly known as Bait-e-Yādgār (Urdu: بیتِ یادگار), is one of the oldest mosques of Rabwah, in Punjab, Pakistan. It is located in the Fazl-e-Omar Hospital, and built in 1958, on the site where Zuhr prayer was offered in September 1948, on the occasion of the inauguration of the new centre.

== History ==
The mosque was built upon the site where Zuhr prayer was led by Mirza Basheer-ud-Din Mahmood Ahmad, the second caliph of the Ahmadiyya Muslim Community on 20 September 1948, on the occasion of the inauguration of the new centre Rabwah, following the migration of Qadian as a result of the Partition of India in 1947.

In 1953, Sufi Khuda Bakhs Sahib, a dervish of Qadian, who was a secretary assistance of settlements [department], had requested the second caliph to have a plinth or a platform built on the location, which served as a mark for the mosque in the Fazl-e-Omar Hospital. The foundation stone of the mosque building was laid 10 years later, on 21 March 1958, by a brick brought from Mubarak Mosque, Qadian and given the name of Bait-e-Yādgār (Urdu: بیتِ یاد گار).

== Architecture ==
The mosque is decorated with tiles, and green shades were installed in the courtyard of the mosque against the extreme weathers. In March 2002, the mosque was further beautified and renovated, and was re-inaugurated by then overseer, Mirza Masroor Ahmad.

== See also ==
- Ahmadiyya in Pakistan
- Islamic architecture
- List of mosques in Pakistan
