= Bahishti Maqbara =

Cemetery in Rabwah, Pakistan

Bahishti Maqbara Rabwah
- Interactive map of Bahishti Maqbara Rabwah

Details
- Location: Rabwah, Punjab
- Country: Pakistan
- Coordinates: 31°45′42.64″N 72°55′1.24″E
- Type: Private
- Owned by: Ahmadiyya Muslim Community
- No. of graves: over 10,000

Bahishti Maqbara (English: The Heavenly Graveyard), located originally in Qadian, India, and then in Rabwah, Pakistan, is a religious cemetery established by the Ahmadiyya Community as a directive from the community's founder Mirza Ghulam Ahmad, made known in his booklet Al-Wasiyyat. Mirza Ghulam Ahmad established it in his will after he saw an angel showing him the place of his burial.

== History ==
In 1905, Mirza Ghulam Ahmad, founder of the Ahmadiyya Community, wrote a publication titled Al-Wassiyat (English: The Will). In it, he describes establishing a cemetery for members of the community who are more spiritual than materialistic. At the time, finding a suitable piece of land in and around Qadian was costly, and, as such, Mirza Ghulam Ahmad proposed a piece of land from his own property.

He also proposed that for anyone to be buried in Bahishti Maqbara, the following three requirements be fulfilled:

#Whoever desires to be buried in this graveyard should contribute towards the expenses of its maintenance according to his capacity.

1. Whoever desires to be buried therein should make a testamentary disposition that one tenth of his property shall, under direction of the Movement, be devoted to the propagation of Islam, and carrying out the teachings of the Quran. It will be open to every righteous person whose faith is perfect to provide for this purpose in his will more than one tenth, but it shall not be less.
2. Whoever shall lead a righteous life and abstain from all that is prohibited and shall not do anything that amounts to association of something with God or to innovation in the faith. He should be a true and sincere Muslim.

— Mirza Ghulam Ahmad, Al-Wasiyyat p. 25-28 (English)

== Allegations ==
It is often alleged that Bahishti Maqbara is an Ahmadiyya-created/influenced heaven or Paradise; however, this is not the case as 'The Heavenly Gardens' is only the name of a cemetery and must be made clear that the Ahmadiyya belief of Heaven is parallel to rest of the entire Muslim Ummah's belief of Heaven/paradise.

== Locations ==
To date, there are two cemeteries dedicated as Bahisti Maqbara. The first is located in Qadian, India and the second, in Rabwah, Pakistan.

=== Qadian ===
On 26 May 1908, Mirza Ghulam Ahmad died, and was taken by train to Batala. From there, he was carried to Qadian where he was eventually buried in Bahisti Maqbara. Thousands of members of the community arrived in Qadian for funeral prayers while prominent leaders within the community unanimously agreed Hakeem Noor-ud-Din should lead the community as the first successor to Mirza Ghulam Ahmad. As Khalifatul Masih, Hakeem Noor-ud-Din led the funeral prayer for Mirza Ghulam Ahmad the same day.

=== Rabwah ===
Although the original cemetery was established in Qadian, after the partition of India when the community moved its headquarters to Rabwah (Pakistan), another branch of the cemetery was established there.

== Notable burials ==
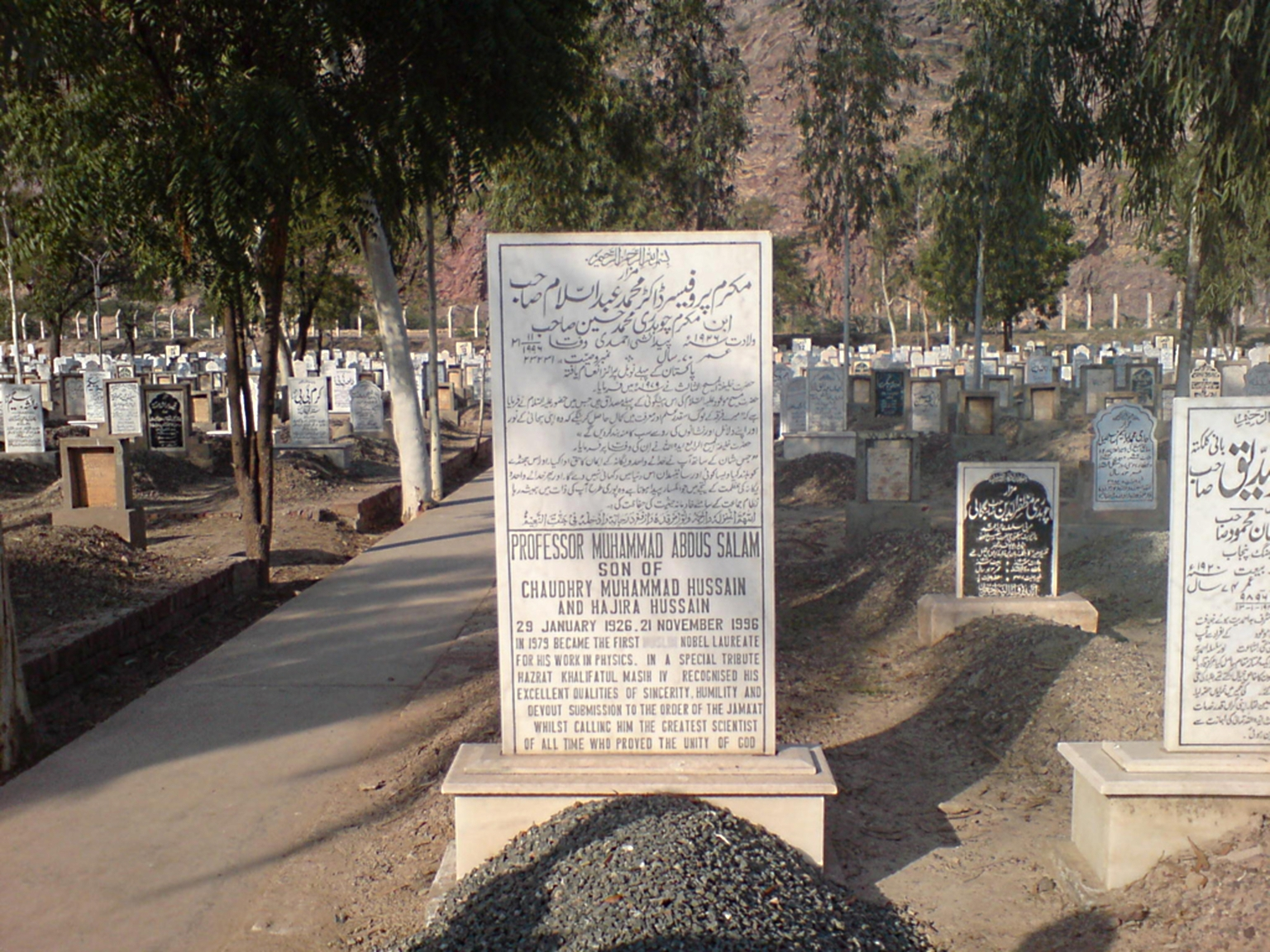
The grave of Abdus Salam in Rabwah

Frequently visited sites in the cemetery include the grave of Mirza Basheer-ud-Din Mahmood Ahmad and Mirza Nasir Ahmad, the second and third Caliphs of the Ahmadiyya Muslim Community and successor of Mirza Ghulam Ahmad.

Nobel laureate Abdus Salam was buried in Bahishti Maqbara, Rabwah next to his parents' graves. The epitaph on his tomb initially read "First Muslim Nobel Laureate" but due to Salam's adherence to the Ahmadiyya Muslim Community, the word "Muslim" was later erased on the orders of a local magistrate under Ordinance XX which declares Ahmadis non-Muslims. After his death on 21 November 1996, over 13,000 visited to pay their last respects and over 30,000 people attended his funeral prayers.

Muhammad Zafarullah Khan, Pakistan's first Asian president of the International Court of Justice is also buried in Bahishti Maqbara, Rabwah.
