= Rabwah Times =

Pakistani digital media publication

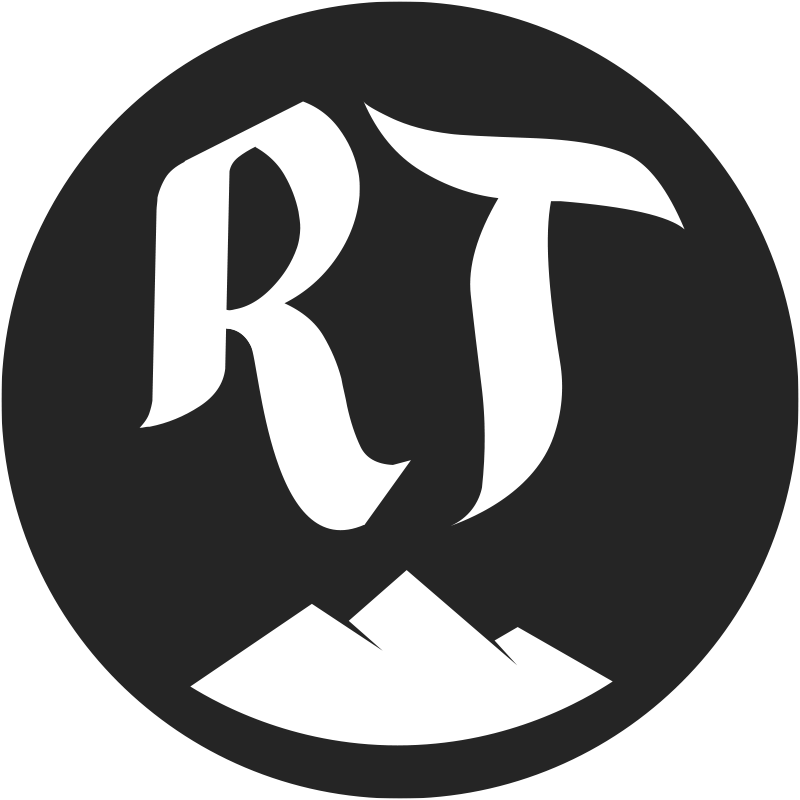
- Type: Newspaper
- Editor: Ehsan Rehan
- Founded: July 17, 2006
- Language: English, Urdu, Arabic
- Headquarters: Lahore, Pakistan
- Country: Pakistan
- ISSN: 2415-5616
- Website: Rabwah Times

Rabwah Times (Urdu: ربوہ ٹائمز) (ISSN No. 2415-5616) is an independent digital media publication which was founded in 2006 by Ehsan Rehan. The publication became the first independent and secular publication for the town of Rabwah, Punjab, Pakistan. The publication started off with a special focus on Minorities in Pakistan, It does not endorse or promote any particular religion, creed beliefs, or non-beliefs. The site offers news, blogs, original content and local news.

== History ==
Rabwah Times was launched on 17 July 2006, as a news portal for the town of Rabwah. The portal later turned into the town's first digital media publication. The publication focuses on Pakistan's minorities and covers unreported religious freedom and human rights violations.

== Reporting ==
Reports by Rabwah Times have been used by leading International rights organizations and Governments which include U.S. Justice Department, UK Home Office, Amnesty International, Australian Government, Canadian Government, USCIRF & APC.

In September 2014, the publication reported on a hate conference to be held in Pakistan.

In July 2015 Rabwah Times reported how Saudi Arabia had used its influence in Indonesia to target the Ahmadi minority in the country.

In December 2016 Rabwah Times reported on a man wanted for terrorism in Pakistan who escaped to Canada. The story was later reported by Canadian newspaper National Post.

In December 2016 Rabwah Times reported on the raid by Pakistan's security forces on the headquarters of the Ahmadiyya community in Pakistan.

In February 2017, an exclusive report revealed how a Mosque in the U.S. State of Maryland hosted celebration in honor of Pakistani killer.

== Controversy ==
In April 2016 Pakistan banned Rabwah Times website for its coverage of minority Ahmadis who are considered non-Muslim under the Law.
