= Malfūzāt =

Sayings of Mirza Ghulam Ahmad

Malfūzāt ملفوظات
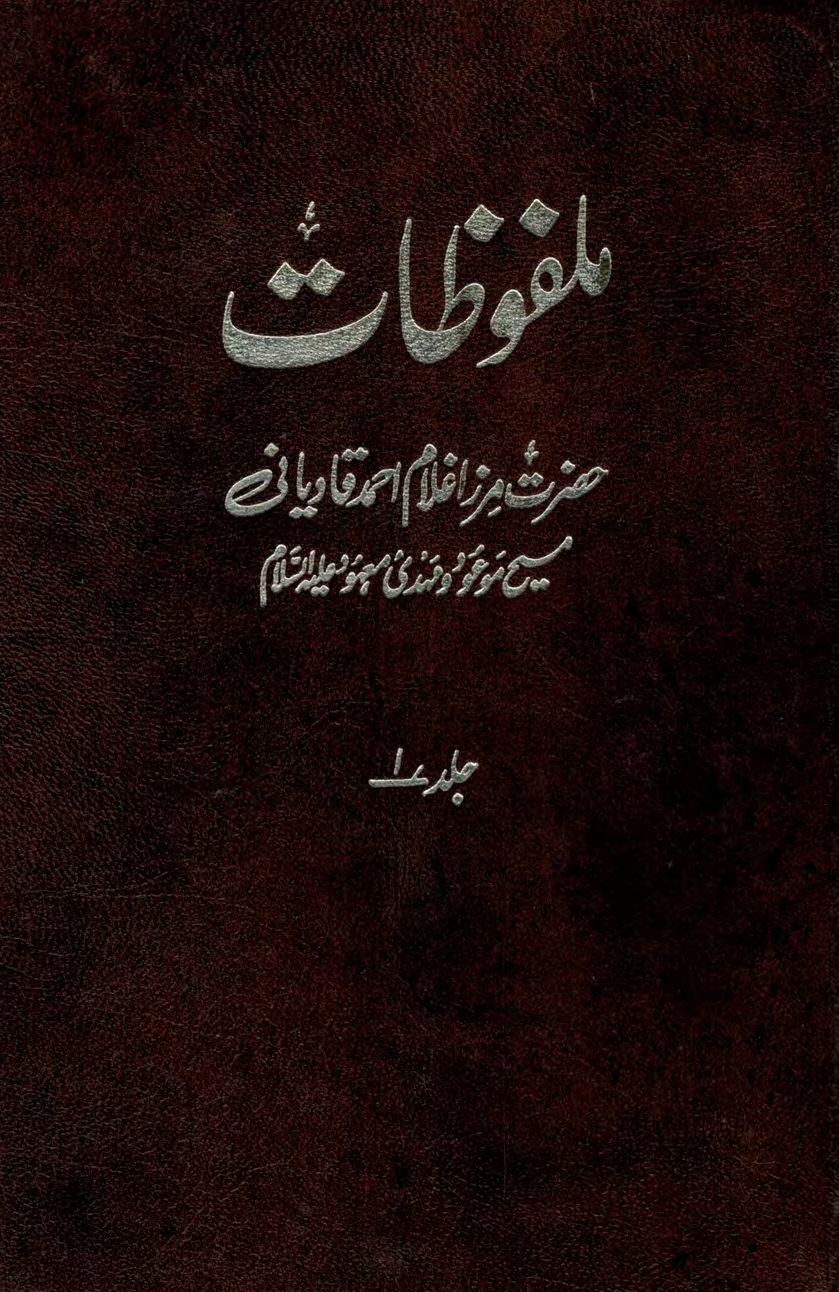
- Front cover of Malfūzāt Volume I, (1984)
- Author: Disciples of Mirza Ghulam Ahmad
- Translator: Ayyaz Mahmood Khan
- Language: Urdu
- Series: Rūhānī Khazā᾽in (2nd series)
- Publisher: Al-Shirkatul Islamiyyah, Islam International Publications
- Publication date: 1st 10 vol. edition: (1960 – 67); reprint: (1984); 5 vol. edition: (2008); computerised 10 vol. edition: (2016)
- Publication place: British India
- English publication date: 2018 – 19 (2 Volumes; 1891 – 1900)
- Media type: 10 Volumes, hardbound and digital

Malfūzāt (Urdu: ملفوظات, "Discourses"; lit. "spoken words") is a ten-volume collection of the discourses, question-and-answer-sessions, sermons and dialogues of Mirza Ghulam Ahmad, the founder of the Ahmadiyya movement. The volumes contain, for the most part, speech that was transcribed by several of Ghulam Ahmad's close disciples as it was being communicated and was published in Ahmadi periodicals during his lifetime, covering a period starting from 1891 until his death in 1908. This material was compiled and published as a set of volumes during the 1960s.

== Composition ==
The Malfūzāt contain those of Mirza Ghulam Ahmad's words that he spoke in the form of an address or discussion in the presence of a congregation or gathering, including during leisurely moments, and were recorded in writing by several companions who kept a diary of his words. The collected sayings include a small number of narrations that were not immediately put to writing but gathered and recorded from the memory of narrators and are therefore deemed to be of lesser reliability. Among Ghulam Ahmad's written and oral output, the Malfūzāt are considered within the Ahmadiyya movement to be of primary importance with regard to the exposition of Islamic morality since they encapsulate those of his sayings which were delivered mostly in such settings when he had the education and moral training of the community of followers in view. Each volume is chronologically arranged with each section dated and sourced, but thematically structured under subheadings related to various religious, theological and moral themes.

== History and compilation ==
In view of the nascent movement's need to have its own periodical that could deal regularly with crucial issues connected to it, two Ahmadi newspapers were established within Mirza Ghulam Ahmad's lifetime, the first of these was the Urdu weekly al-Hakam, established in October 1897 and edited by his disciple Shaykh Yaqub Ali; the second was the Urdu weekly al-Badr which began publishing in 1902 and was edited by Mufti Muhammad Sadiq, also a disciple of Ghulam Ahmad. Among other things, these periodicals played a central role in preserving Ghulam Ahmad's speeches and conversations.

Though earlier efforts were made to collect this material—a seven volume compilation by Muhammad Manzur Ilahi was published under the name of Malfūzāt-i Ahmadiyya by the Anjuman-i Isha'at-i Islam, Lahore in the early 1930s, relying exclusively on the material in al-Hakam and al-Badr; and a single volume, published by the Ahmadiyya Muslim Community, appeared in 1936—the first concerted effort to collate the entirety of Ghulam Ahmad's spoken words was made by Jalal-ud-Din Shams and several Ahmadi scholars working in his supervision and published in the form of a complete set of ten volumes between 1960 and 1967. This ten-volume set was reprinted in 1984 and compressed into five volumes in 2008. In 2016, A ten-volume computerised typset edition was published for greater clarity of script and easier handling and navigation of the text.

== Volumes ==
Volume	First published	Period
I	1960	1891 to 1899
II	1960	1900 to 1901
III	1961	November 1901 to October 14, 1902
IV	1962	October 1902 to January 16, 1903
V	1963	January 17 to May 30, 1903
VI	1963	June 1, 1903 to April 1904
VII	1964	May 2, 1904 to August 1905
VIII	1965	September 1, 1905 to May 30, 1906
IX	1966	July 1906 to October 19, 1907
X	1967	October 1907 to May 1908

== English Translation ==
Although selected passages of the Malfūzāt had earlier been translated into English within the volumes of The Essence of Islam by Zafarullah Khan between 1979 and 1981, as of 2021 three complete volumes have been translated by Ayyaz Mahmood Khan as the Sayings & Discourses of the Promised Messiah, together covering a period from 1891 to August 1901.

== See also ==
- Hadith
- Mirza Ghulam Ahmad bibliography
- Maktūbāt-i Ahmad (Collected letters of Ghulam Ahmad)
