= Nazarat Taleem =

Pakistan Muslim education directorate

- Established: 1919
- Location: Pakistan
- Website: nazarattaleem.org

Nazarat Taleem (Directorate of Education), launched in 1919, is a directorate within the Sadr Anjuman Ahmadiyya, in Pakistan, responsible for the task of formalizing education within schools and colleges of the Ahmadiyya Muslim Community Pakistan.

== History ==
Ahmadiyya Muslim Community has been involved in building educational institutes since 1905. Nazarat Taleem (Directorate of Education) one of the ten directorates of Sadr Anjuman Ahmadiyya was created in 1919.The directorate in Qadian, India, ran various educational institutions. After partition of the subcontinent the offices were shifted to Pakistan.

In 1973, under the label of nationalization, the educational institutes of Ahmadiyya Muslim Community were nationalized by the Government of Pakistan. These included 8 schools across Pakistan, including 2 top colleges of Pakistan, Taleem-ul-Islam College, in Rabwah. The Government also nationalized 5 of its institutes in the province of Sindh.

In 1987 the Ahmadiyya Muslim Community started building its new educational institutions. Currently Nazarat Taleem is running 11 schools and 2 colleges in Rabwah and 21 schools in remote areas of Pakistan, mostly in the provinces of Sindh and Punjab.

== Institutions ==
Institutions operating under Nazarat Taleem in are as follows:

- Buyut-ul-Hamd Primary School
- Boyut-ul-Hamd High School
- Maryam Girls High School
- Maryam Siddiqa Girls High School
- Nusrat Jahan Academy Boys
- Nusrat Jahan Academy Girls
- Tahir Primary School
- Nasir Higher Secondary School
- Institute for Special Education

Established in Nov 2013 in Rabwah, the Institute for Special Education runs under the domain of Nazarat Taleem, with the objective of catering to the needs of children and youth with intellectual, developmental or physical disabilities through education and therapy. The school aims to raise public awareness of the care and education available to people with special needs in the area.

== Academics ==
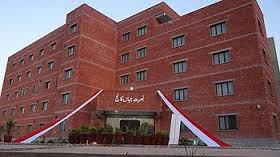
Nusrat Jahan college Rabwah

Nazarat Taleem offers undergraduate and postgraduate education to the community members through, Nusrat Jahan College, Rabwah. Currently BS Honors and master's degree programs in pure and applied scientific fields are being offered there.

The three schools run by the college are:

- Abdus Salam School of Sciences.
- MM Ahmed School of Business
- Sir Zafarullah Khan school of social sciences and languages.

The majority of the students enrolled in these schools are Ahmadis, mostly the residents of Rabwah, but enrollment is open for non-Ahmadi students from Rabwah and its surrounding areas as well.

=== Scholarships ===
Nazarat Taleem provides financial assistance to the talented students who cannot afford further studies.

=== Abdus Salam Research Forum ===
Abdus Salam research forum was established in 2013 by Nazarat Taleem with the core objective to actively promote & foster the faculties of Science and Research. Currently this forum is supporting various research projects in the domain of Environment, Community Medicine, Biophysics, Alternative Energy, Bio-statistics and Genetic Engineering.

==== International medical conferences ====
Every year Nazarat Taleem under the banner of Abdus Salam research forum and in collaboration with Fazl e Umar and Tahir heart Institute, Rabwah holds an international medical conference in Rabwah, Pakistan. Three conferences have been held so far.

- International Pediatric Conference 2014
- International Infectious Diseases Conference 2015
- International Conference on Internal Medicine and Tropical Cardiology 2016
