= Basharat Mosque =

Mosque in Pedro Abad, Córdoba, Spain

- Spanish: Mezquita Basharat
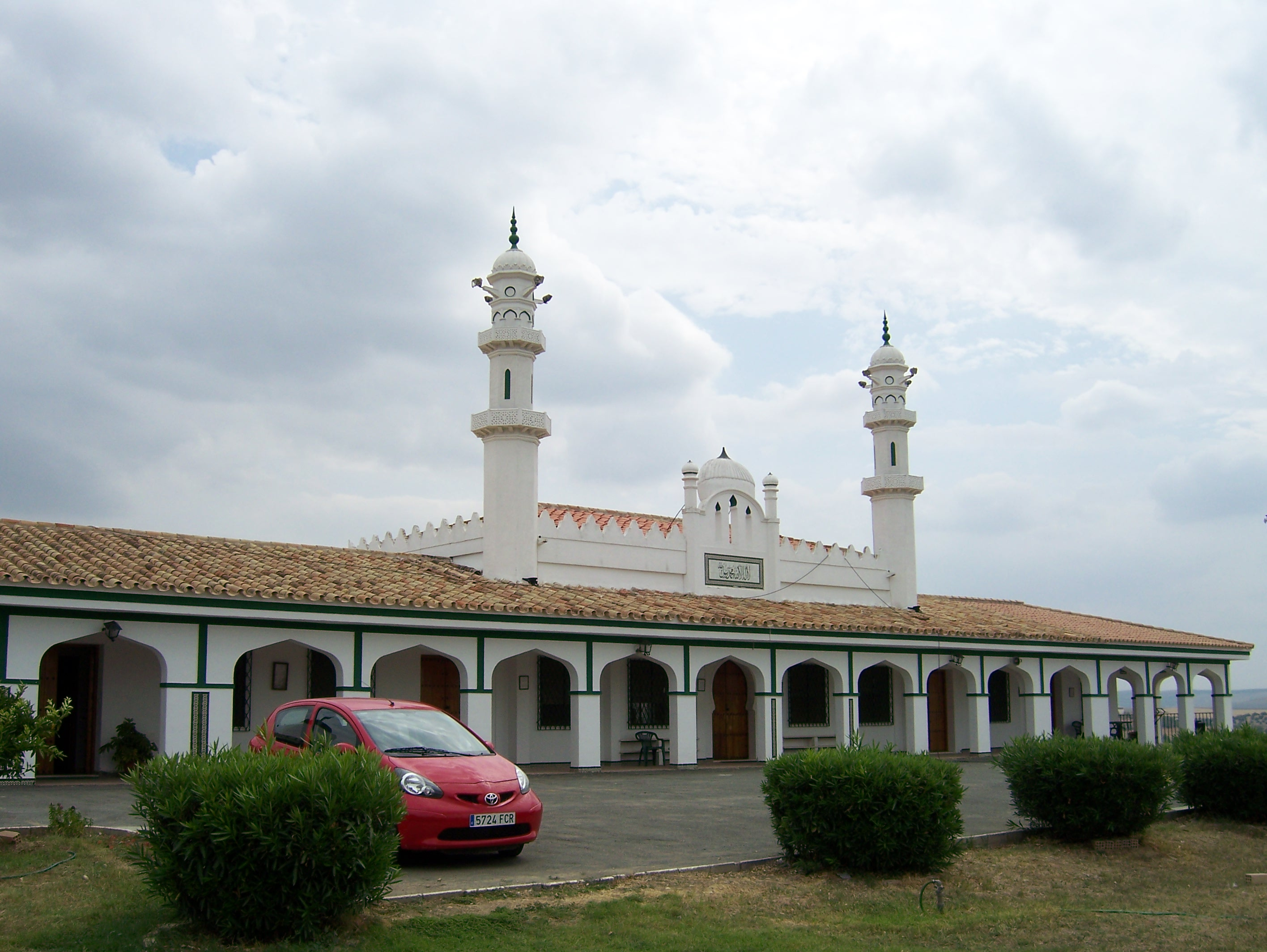
- The mosque in 2006

- Location of the mosque in the Province of Córdoba

Religion
- Affiliation: Islam
- Branch/tradition: Ahmadiyya
- Ecclesiastical or organizational status: Mosque
- Status: Active

Location
- Location: Pedro Abad, Córdoba, 14630
- Country: Spain
- Interactive map of Basharat Mosque
- Coordinates: 37°57′56″N 4°27′42″W

Architecture
- Type: Mosque
- Groundbreaking: 1980; 46 years ago
- Completed: 1982; 44 years ago
- Minaret: 2

Website
- alislam.es

The Basharat Mosque (Spanish: Mezquita Basharat, lit. 'Good News Mosque'; Urdu: مسجد بشارت), also known as Masjid Basharat, is a mosque in Pedro Abad, Córdoba, Spain. It is the first purpose-built mosque in Spain after centuries of Christian rule.

== History ==
The foundation stone was laid on October 9, 1980 by Mirza Nasir Ahmad, the Caliphate of worldwide Ahmadiyya Muslim Community. It was inaugurated on 10 September 1982 by the fourth head of Ahmadiyya Community, Mirza Tahir Ahmad. The mosque is the centre of Ahmadiyya-Movement in Spain.

=== Jalsa Salana ===
Jalsa Salana, the annual gathering of the Ahmadiyya Muslim Community in Spain, is celebrated in Pedro Abad.

== Architecture ==
The mosque was designed after reminiscences of the White Minaret and Noor Mosque in Qadian.

== See also ==
- Islam in Spain
- List of mosques in Spain
