= Fazl-e-Omar Hospital =

Fazl-e-Omar Hospital فضلِ عمر ہسپتال
- Ahmadiyya
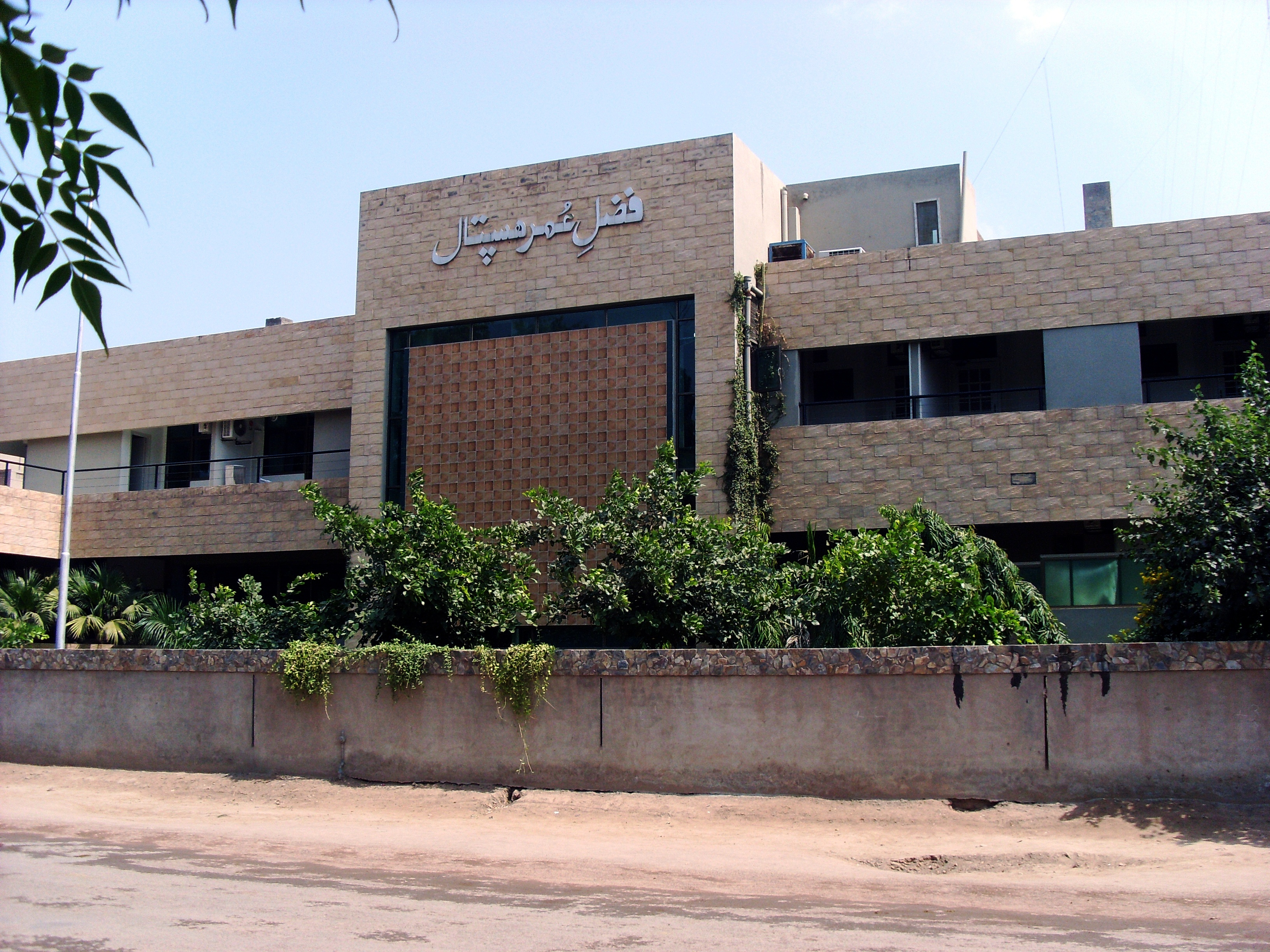
- Fazl-e-Omar Hospital

Geography
- Location: Rabwah, Punjab, Pakistan
- Coordinates: 31°45′34.3″N 72°55′2.5″E

Organisation
- Type: General

History
- Opened: 1958

Links
- Lists: Hospitals in Pakistan

Fazl-e-Omar Hospital (Urdu: فَضْلِ عُمْر ہَسْپِتَال) is a private health care institute in the city of Rabwah, Punjab, Pakistan. Founded in 1958, it is run by the Ahmadiyya Muslim Community and provides hospital services to the local community and patients from towns and villages from further afield. The hospital provides medical care in specialities such as medicine, surgery and paediatrics.

== Buildings ==
=== Begum Zubaida Bani Wing ===
2003 saw the opening of the new gynaecology/obstetrics unit at the hospital, Begum Zubaida Bani Wing. The 3-storey modern facility was opened to provide a wide range of medical/surgical services for women including gynaecology outpatient's clinic, gynaecology, antenatal/postnatal wards and operation theatre. Also incorporated in the building is the paediatric ICU unit. The department has a 24-hour delivery suite with approximately 900 delivery cases annually. The new building has a modern décor with large waiting areas, including a children's play area in the outpatient's clinic, and well decorated, fully air-conditioned private rooms, central oxygen supply & suction units. Begum Zub-aida Bani Wing also has a separate set-up for hepatitis patients.

To facilitate doctor and nurse training a seminar room and library are also available in the new wing. With the opening of this new centre it is hoped that the hospital can provide the most up-to-date medical care for women in the area including services such as colour Doppler and bone density measurement. It is also equipped with patients elevator.

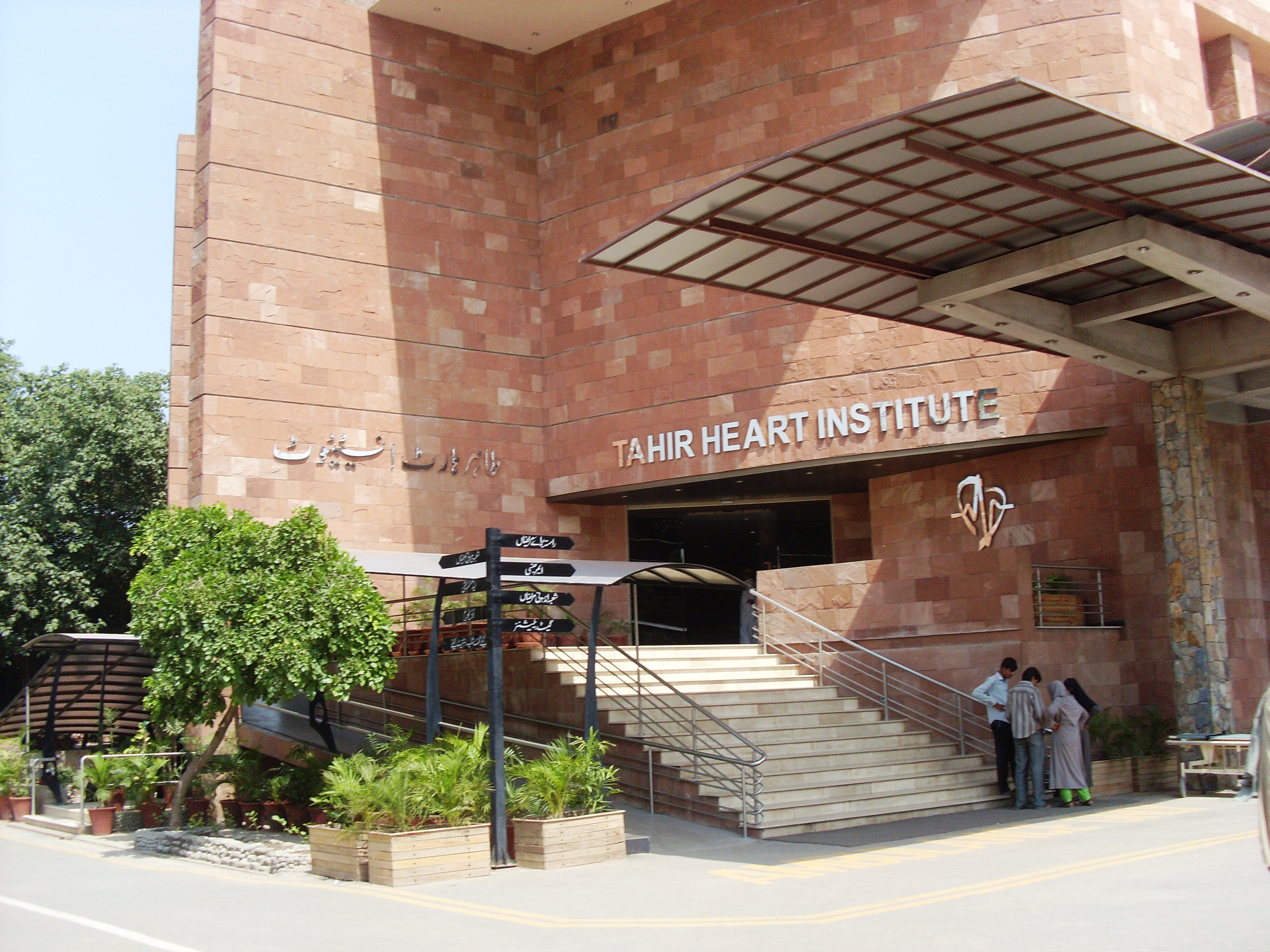
Tahir Heart Institute

=== Tahir Heart Institute ===
Tahir Heart Institute is one of the new 6-storey cardiac institute. The centre is to named after the fourth Khalifa of the Ahmadiyya Jamaat, Mirza Tahir Ahmad, who died in April 2003 and whose desire it was to have such a centre in Rabwah.

The new institute provides a wide range of cardiac care including open heart surgery, angiography / angioplasty treatment and full cardiac support services. It consists of a 250 seated auditorium, as well as facilities for patient care THI will also incorporate a research centre. The central office for the International Ahmadiyya Medical Association is incoporated in this new wing. In addition to this, architectural plans are being made for the roof of the new centre to be used as a base for an air ambulance used to transport patients to and from the hospital.

== Services ==
The following medical services are available in the hospital:

- General Surgery
- Gynaecology And Obstetrics
- ENT
- Eye surgery
- Dental Surgery
- Anaesthesia
- Medicine
- Paediatriac
- Laboratory Services
- Radiology Services
- Pharmaceuticals Services

== Visiting faculty ==
The hospital also enjoys the services of a visiting faculty:

- Cardiology (2 days a month)
- Dermatology (visiting specialist once a month)
- Psychiatry (visiting specialist once a month)
- Cosmetic and Plastic surgery (visiting specialist once a month)
- Cardiac Surgery

== See also ==
- Rabwah
- Ahmadiyya Muslim Community
