= Rabwah =

Rabwah ربوہ
- Municipal Committee
- Chenab Nagar
- Location in Punjab, Pakistan Rabwah (Pakistan)
- Coordinates: 31°45′10″N 72°55′20″E
- Country: Pakistan
- Province: Punjab
- District: Chiniot District
- Sub-district: Lalian Tehsil
- Settled: 20 September 1948

Area
  - Total: 24 km^{2} (9.3 sq mi)
- Elevation: 300 m (980 ft)

Population (2023)
  - Total: 81,695
  - Density: 2,300/km^{2} (6,000/sq mi)
- Time zone: UTC+5 (PST)
  - Summer (DST): UTC+6 (PDT)
- Postal code: 35460
- Area code: 047

Rabwah (/ræbˈwə/; Punjabi / Urdu: ربوہ; Punjabi pronunciation: [ɾə̀ʋːäː]; Urdu pronunciation: [ɾəb.wɑ]), officially known as Chenab Nagar (Urdu: چناب نگر; pronounced [t͡ʃə.nɑːb nə.ɡəɾ]), is a city in Chiniot District, Punjab, Pakistan on the bank of Chenab River.

It was the headquarters of the Ahmadiyya Muslim Community from September 20, 1948 when the community relocated from Qadian, India to the newly created state of Pakistan, where the community bought the area of present-day Rabwah from the government to establish its home. This continued until 1984 and the establishment of Ordinance XX. In 1984, the headquarters were moved to the United Kingdom with Mirza Tahir Ahmed, first to London and then in 2019 to the Islamabad compound in Tilford, Surrey.

== Etymology ==
Rabwah is an Arabic word meaning an "elevated place". The formal inauguration of the settlement took place on 20 September 1948 after prayers and a sacrifice of five goats at the corners and centre of the area. The town was named Rabwah by then leader of the Ahmadiyya Muslim Community, Mirza Basheer-ud-Din Mahmood Ahmad. However, the Provincial Assembly of the Punjab passed a resolution on 17 November 1998 changing the name of Rabwah to ‘Nawan Qadian’. On 14 February 1999, a new directive was issued, renaming Nawan Qadian to Chenab Nagar. The other names considered were Chak Dhaggian, Mustafa Abad, and Siddiq Abad.

== History ==
=== Medieval History ===
From a historical perspective, Rabwah is from where Muhammad Bin Qasim, after conquering Sindh and Multan, crossed the Chenab River and moved towards Kashmir. Here the Arabs fought against the Hindu Raja of Chandrod (which is probably the ancient name of Chiniot). More than 100 Arab soldiers lost their lives in the battle and a "Graveyard of Martyrs" exists to this day in Chiniot.

=== Modern Era ===
Before the establishment of Rabwah, the area was barren and was known as Chak Digiyaan. The land was bought by the Ahmadiyya community following the migration of most of its members from Qadian and other parts of Indian Punjab, to the newly created nation of Pakistan. In June 1948, 1,034 acres of land were bought from the government for PKR 12,000.

The first settlements were in camps which were later replaced by buildings constructed of mud. The first ever building constructed using concrete was the Mahmood Mosque. Electricity was provisioned to the city in 1954.

Mirza Basheer-ud-Din Mahmood Ahmad relocated to Rabwah on 19th of Sept 1949. By that time the population had reached 1,000. The first ever Jalsa Salana in Rabwah took place from 15 to 17 April 1949, attended by 17,000 people.

== Demography ==
Historical population
Year	Pop.	±% p.a.
1951	2,684	—
1961	9,991	+14.05%
1972	15,879	+4.30%
1981	28,010	+6.51%
1998	43,870	+2.67%
2017	64,204	+2.02%
2023	81,695	+4.10%

According to the 2023 Census the city's population was 81,695 up from 64,204 in 2017.

=== Religion ===
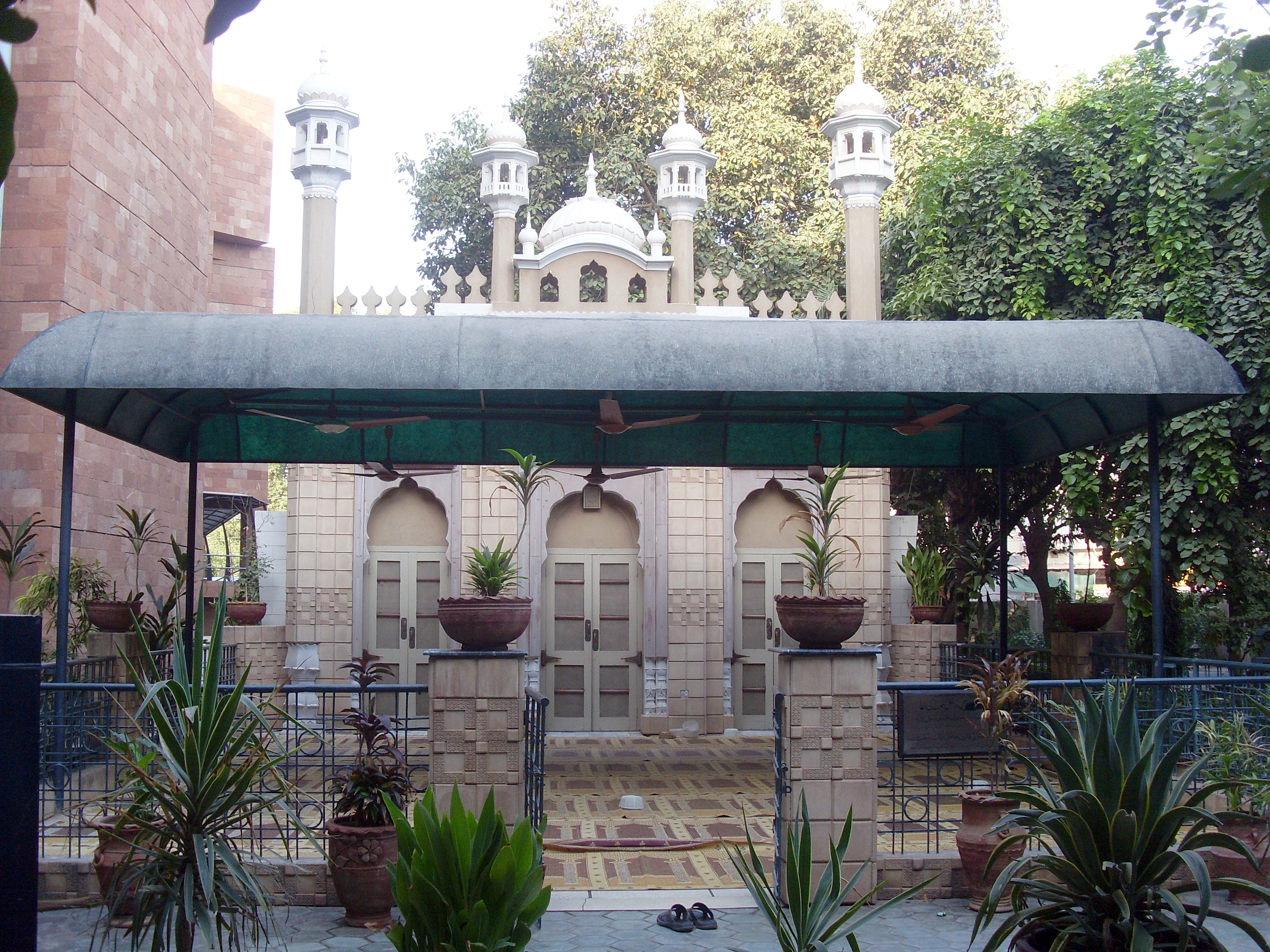
Yadgar Mosque, the first mosque built in Rabwah.

Majority of the Rabwah residents belongs to the Ahmadi Islam sect and it is the only major Ahmadiyya city in Pakistan. According to the sources, Ahmadis form 90-95% of the city population. Majority of the non-Ahmadi Muslims in the city reside in the nominal "Muslim Colony" neighbourhood of Rabwah, colonised by settlers of the Khatm-e-Nabuwwat organisation and all government official positions are occupied by non-Ahmadis. There is a small Christian population in the city with various churches in the city.

As the city is the only Ahmadi majority city in Pakistan, its residents face legal discrimination due to Ordinance XX. They have been denied the right to hold peaceful religious gatherings since 1983. In 1989, a report was registered by Punjab police against the whole of the population of the city for the crime that they were displaying Quranic texts on their graves and buildings.

The place where Mirza Basheer-ud-Din Mahmood Ahmad led the first ever prayers became the site of the first mosque in Rabwah, known as the Yadgaar Mosque (The Memorial Mosque). It was built in 1958 and located in the courtyard of the Fazl-e-Omar Hospital. By 1964, there were a total of 27 mosques in the town, including Mubarak Mosque. The Aqsa Mosque was completed in March 1972 and remains as the largest Ahmadi Muslim mosque, and is known as the Jamia Masjid Rabwah, spanning across 70,000 square feet.

=== Languages ===
The mother tongue of the majority of the populace is Punjabi, while for a small minority it is Urdu and Saraiki.

== Geography ==
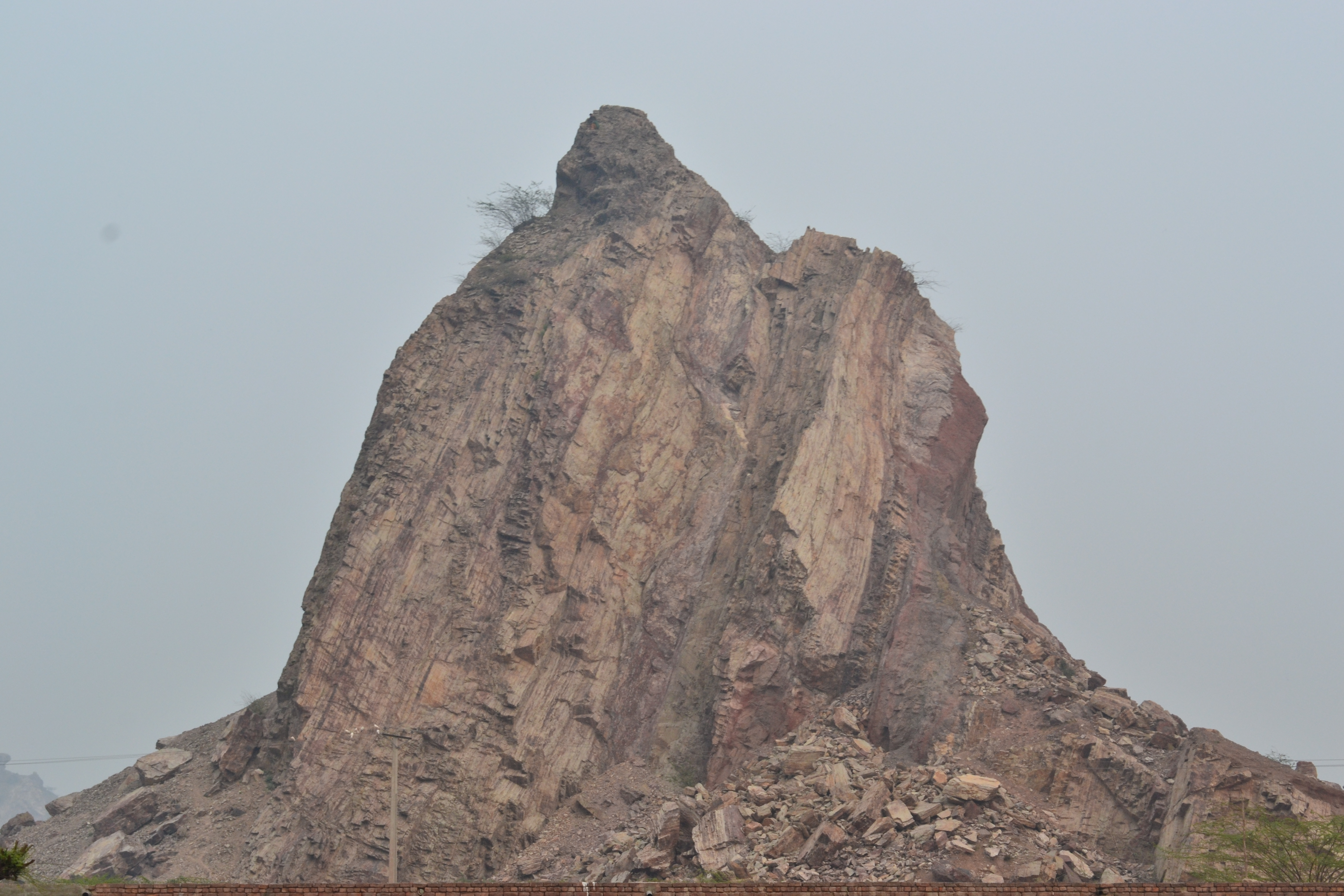
Tilla Chenab beside Rabwah and between Rabwah and the Chenab River.

Rabwah covers an area of about 24 km^{2} (9.3 sq mi). It is located in the temperate region of Central Punjab, approximately halfway between Faisalabad and Sargodha. The River Chenab surrounds the city on its Eastern and Southern sides. The area is higher than the surrounding plains due to the dry hills which dot the landscape, providing a natural barrier against floods. These hills are part of the Kirana Hills, also known locally as the Black Mountains, which reach from Sargodha to Jhang. The area, which used to be arid and barren, has been transformed through more than fifty years of aggressive plantation into a lush green city.

=== Climate ===
According to the Köppen climate classification Rabwah experiences a borderline hot semi-arid climate (BSh)/humid subtropical climate (Koppen: Cwa). The city shares typical weather patterns of the northwestern Subcontinent: sweltering summers and pleasant to warm winters. The summer season is from April to October where May, the hottest month, sees temperatures regularly reach 40 °C or 104 °F. The location in the centre of the dry plains is responsible for dust storms in the summer. Summer also brings the Indian Monsoon which increases the precipitation in the month of June and July to above 100 millimetres or 4 inches. The winter season is from November to February where January is the coldest month and temperatures may fall to the freezing point. The winters also bring fog which can reduce the visibility to dangerously low levels.

Climate data for Rabwah (1961-1990)
Month	Jan	Feb	Mar	Apr	May	Jun	Jul	Aug	Sep	Oct	Nov	Dec	Year
Mean daily maximum °C (°F)	19 (66)	22 (72)	27 (81)	33 (91)	39 (102)	39 (102)	35 (95)	35 (95)	34 (93)	32 (90)	27 (81)	21 (70)	30 (87)
Mean daily minimum °C (°F)	8 (46)	11 (52)	16 (61)	20 (68)	25 (77)	28 (82)	27 (81)	27 (81)	25 (77)	20 (68)	14 (57)	9 (48)	19 (67)
Average precipitation mm (inches)	18 (0.7)	35 (1.4)	24 (0.9)	13 (0.5)	37 (1.5)	98 (3.9)	122 (4.8)	137 (5.4)	63 (2.5)	9 (0.4)	11 (0.4)	12 (0.5)	579 (22.9)
Source: My Weather

=== Neighborhoods ===
The planned city was originally divided into following neighbourhoods:

- Darus-Sadr or Dar al-Sadr (The Main/Central Area)
- Darur-Rahmat or Dar al-Rahmat (The Abode of Mercy)
- Darul-Futuh or Dar al-Futuh (The Abode of Triumphs)
- Darul-Barakat Dar al-Barakat (The Abode of Blessings)
- Darul-Uloom or Dar al-Ulum (The Abode of Learning)
- Darul-Nasr or Dar al-Nasr (The Abode of Divine Help)
- Darush-Shukr or Dar al-Shukr (The Abode of Gratitude)
- Darul-Yumn or Dar al-Yumn (The Abode of Blessings)
- Babul-Abwab or Bab al-Abwab (Door of the Doors)

Later on, as the city expanded, these boroughs were split into sub-divisions. Also many new neighborhoods were established like Factory Area, Tahir Abad, Nasir Abad, Rahman Colony, Muslim Colony, Buyutul-Hamd, etc.

=== Sports and recreational places ===
Many neighborhoods have their own playing areas for children. Popular sports include cricket, football and badminton, basketball and rowing. There is an Olympic sized swimming pool in the city, along with well-maintained tennis and squash courts.

Buyut-ul-hamd park is a small amusement park in Rabwah. The riverbank and many farmhouses in the surrounding areas are considered good picnic spots.

=== Commercial places ===
- Gol Bazar ("Round Market") is a semi-circular market in Rabwah which houses most of the city's bank branches.
- Masroor Plaza is a commercial plaza located in the center of the town.

== Transport ==
Cycling is the predominant mode of transportation in Rabwah, augmented by motorcycles and motorcycle rickshaws. From the city, there are bus services to Islamabad, Lahore, Faisalabad, Karachi and other major cities in Pakistan. Rabwah can be accessed by the M-2 (National Highway Motorway 2) while the nearest airport is in Faisalabad (48 kilometres (30 mi)). It also has its own railway station, the Chenab Nagar railway station.

== Education ==
Rabwah has a high literacy rate with school enrollment of nearly hundred percent. This is reflected by numerous achievements by students from Rabwah. There are numerous government and private primary and secondary schools as well as colleges.

=== Talim-ul-Islam College and School ===
Talim-ul-Islam College was founded in 1898 in Qadian by the Ahmadiyya Community and relocated to Rabwah in 1947. It was nationalized under the government of Zulfikar Ali Bhutto as part of his nationalization program. An old students association of the college is active and publishes the Al Manar magazine.

=== Jami'a Nusrat Girls College and School ===
This is an all Girls College and School founded by the Ahmadiyya Community which was later nationalized.

=== Nusrat Jahan Schools ===
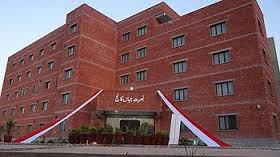
Nusrat Jahan College, Girls Campus

These are a group of non-profit, private, educational institutions in Rabwah. They were established under and named after the Nusrat Jahan Scheme; a scheme launched by the community for the educational betterment of its members. Nusrat Jahan Schools include the Nusrat Jahan Academy Boys School, Nusrat Jahan Academy Girls School, Nusrat Jahan Boys College and Nusrat Jahan Girls College. These institutions offer programmes of primary, secondary, higher secondary and higher education. They are operated by Nazarat Taleem Sadr Anjuman Ahmadiyya Pakistan.

In 2011, the external examination board of all Nusrat Jahan Schools was changed from the Board of Intermediate and Secondary Education Faisalabad to the Aga Khan University Examination Board. ^{[1]}

Institute for special education

Nazarat Taleem has started a school for special children in Rabwah. It is a revolutionary project in which Nazarat Taleem has started delivering all the basic and necessary facilities for disable children in the separate school including special buses to pick and drop etc.

=== Other educational Institutions ===
- Schools under Nazarat Taleem:
  - Bayout-ul-Hamd Primary School
  - Bayoutul Hamd Girls High School
  - Maryam Girls High School
  - Maryam Siddiqua Girls High School
  - Nusrat Jahan Academy Boys
  - Nusrat Jahan Academy Girls
  - Tahir Primary School
  - Nasir High School Boys
  - Nasir High School Girls
  - Institute for special education
  - nusrat Jahan college
- Self-directed Schools:
  - Ahmadiyya Public School
  - Heaven House Public School
  - Al Ahmad Public School
  - Crescent Grammar High School
  - Star Academy

=== Jamia Ahmadiyya ===
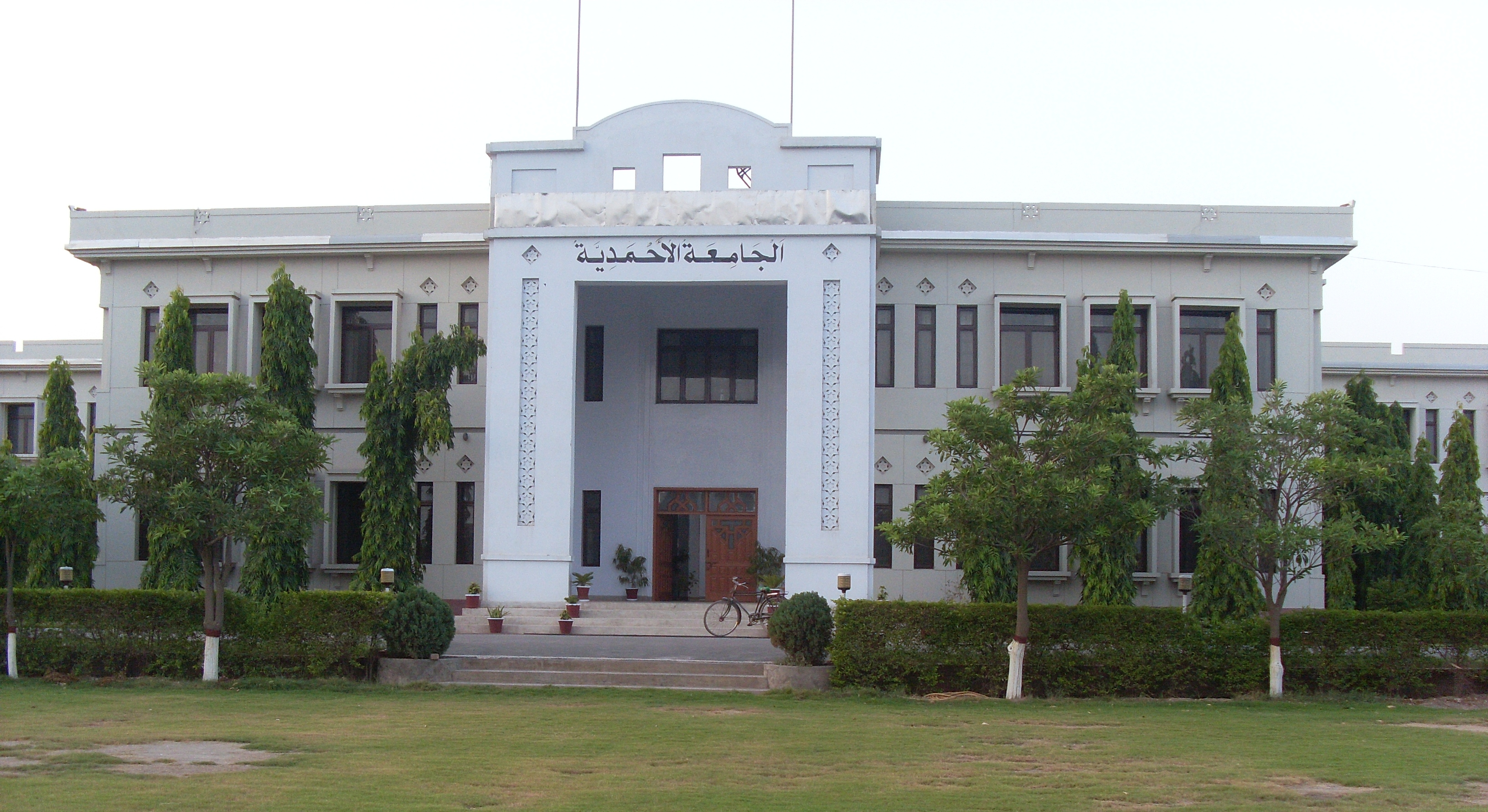
Jamia Ahmadiyya Missionary College

Jamia Ahmadiyya is an International Islamic Seminary and Educational institute with branches all over the world. It offers a seven-year theology degree, Shahid. It has both junior and senior campuses.

=== Madrasatul-Hifz ===
It has two campuses one for boys and one for girls. It is an institution for the memorization of the Quran. Interested students can join after completing their primary education and after completion of the 3-year course they continue their education from the eighth grade.

=== Darul Sana'at Technical Institute ===
This is a Vocational Education Institute for teaching different technical skills to the students who are not pursuing other academics.

=== Khilafat library ===
The Khilafat library is open to all members of public and is the central library of Ahmadiyya community. It contains both religious and secular books on wide range of subjects. It was established on 18 January 1970.

== Health ==
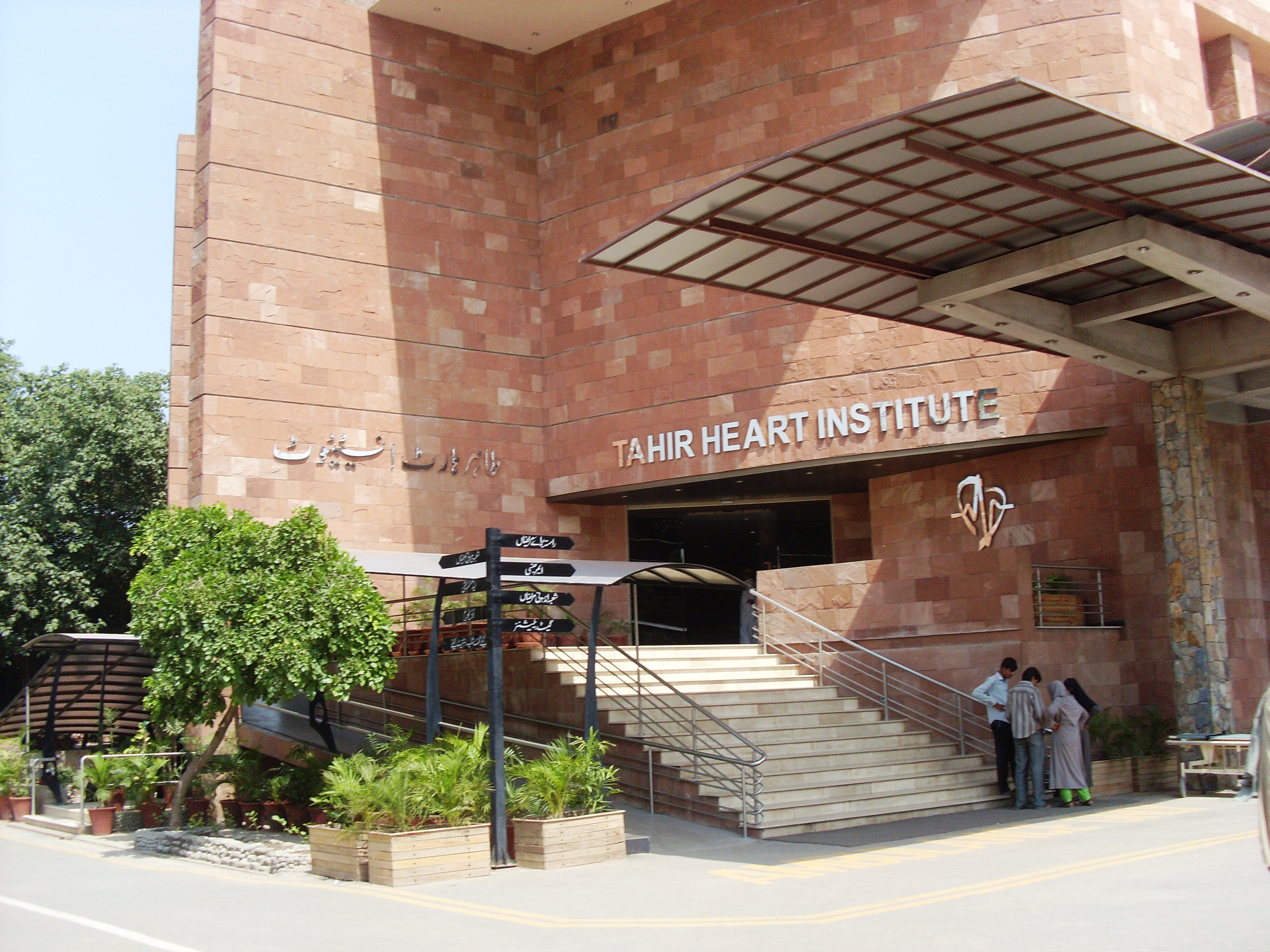
Tahir Heart Institute

=== Fazl-e-Omar Hospital ===
The Fazl-e-Omar Hospital Complex is the main private hospital of the city and caters to the majority of population's needs. It is run by the Ahmadiyya Muslim Community. Founded in 1958 it has now become one of the medical facilities in the area providing hospital services not only to the local community but also to patients from towns and villages from further afield.

The Begum Zubaida Bani Gynecology and Obstetrics Wing is a modern facility offering a wide range of obstetric and gynecological services.

The Tahir Heart Institute is named after the late fourth Caliph of the Ahmadiyya Muslim Community, Mirza Tahir Ahmad. It is one of the best equipped heart institutes in the region.

=== Noor ul Ain Blood & Eye Bank ===
It is a specialized center which manages eye donors from around the country and performs corneal transplants. A blood donation centre, pathology laboratory, and dental clinic are also housed in the same complex.

=== Tahir Homeopathic Research and Training Institute ===
Tahir Homeopathic Clinic and Research Institute operates free clinics round the year. Last year it dispensed free medicine to 44,000 patients. The Institute plans to open new clinics in other countries and to connect all such clinics operating in any country through the email system. Patient records and diagnosis are maintained on computers to facilitate follow-up.

== Newspapers and publications ==
- Al Fazl is a daily newspaper published from the Ziaul Islam Press located in Rabwah and one of the oldest newspapers of Pakistan and is the Ahmadiyya Community's official organ. It started off as a weekly in 1913 in Qadian and moved to Rabwah after the partition of India. It contains news and articles relating to the community and its faith along with national and international news. Due to Ordinance XX, the newspaper is forbidden by law to use words that are deemed "Islamic", such as Muslim, Islam and shaheed. Publication was suspended after a raid by Pakistan's security forces in December 2016.
- The Rabwah Times is an independent publication founded in 2006 by Ehsan Rehan.
- Misbah is a magazine for women.
- Tashhez ul Azhan is directed towards children.
- Khalid includes articles written by and for youth.
- Ansarullah is aimed at the elderly.

== Notable residents ==
Some of the notable residents of the city are:

- Mirza Basheer-ud-Din Mahmood Ahmad, founder of the city and eldest son of Mirza Ghulam Ahmad. Khalīfatul Masīh II of Ahmadiyya Muslim Community.
- Mirza Nasir Ahmad, Khalifatul Masih III of the Ahmadiyya Muslim Community.
- Mirza Tahir Ahmad, Khalifatul Masih IV of the community.
- Mirza Masroor Ahmad, Khalifatul Masih V of the community.
- M. M. Ahmad, Former executive director and Vice President of the World Bank.
