= Pedro Abad =

- Flag Seal

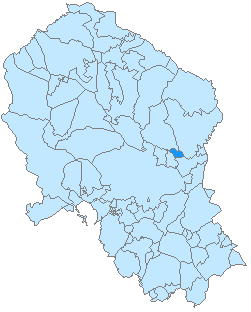
- Pedro Abad in the province of Córdoba
- Coordinates: 37°58′N 4°27′W
- Country: Spain
- Province: Córdoba
- Municipality: Pedro Abad

Area
  - Total: 24 km^{2} (9.3 sq mi)
- Elevation: 162 m (531 ft)

Population (2025-01-01)
  - Total: 2,794
  - Density: 120/km^{2} (300/sq mi)
- Time zone: UTC+1 (CET)
  - Summer (DST): UTC+2 (CEST)

Pedro Abad is a municipality located in the province of Córdoba, Spain. According to the 2006 census (INE), the city has a population of 2,934 inhabitants.

== Parties ==
List of Mayors by Party
| Year | Name | Political Party |
|---|---|---|
| 1979–1983 | Miguel García Rodriguez | United Left |
| 1983–1987 | Miguel García Rodriguez | United Left |
| 1987–1991 | Miguel García Rodriguez | United Left |
| 1991–1995 | Miguel García Rodriguez | United Left |
| 1995–1999 | Miguel García Rodriguez | United Left |
| 1999–2003 | Miguel García Rodriguez | United Left |
| 2003–2007 | María Luisa Wic | Spanish Socialist Workers' Party |
| 2007–2011 | María Luisa Wic | Spanish Socialist Workers' Party |
| 2011– | Magdalena Luque Canalejo | United Left |

== Buildings ==
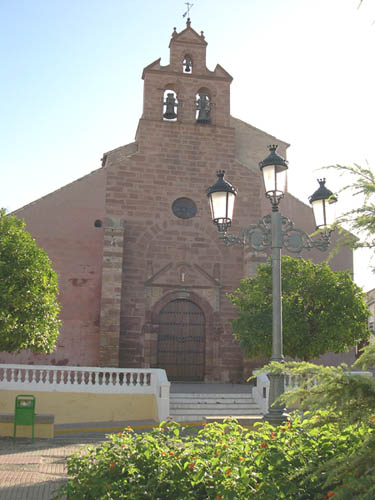

- Iglesia de la Asunción.Ermita del Santísimo Cristo de los Desamparados. Birth house of “Santa Rafaela M.ª Porras”, fundadora of “Esclavas del Sagrado Corazón de Jesús”.

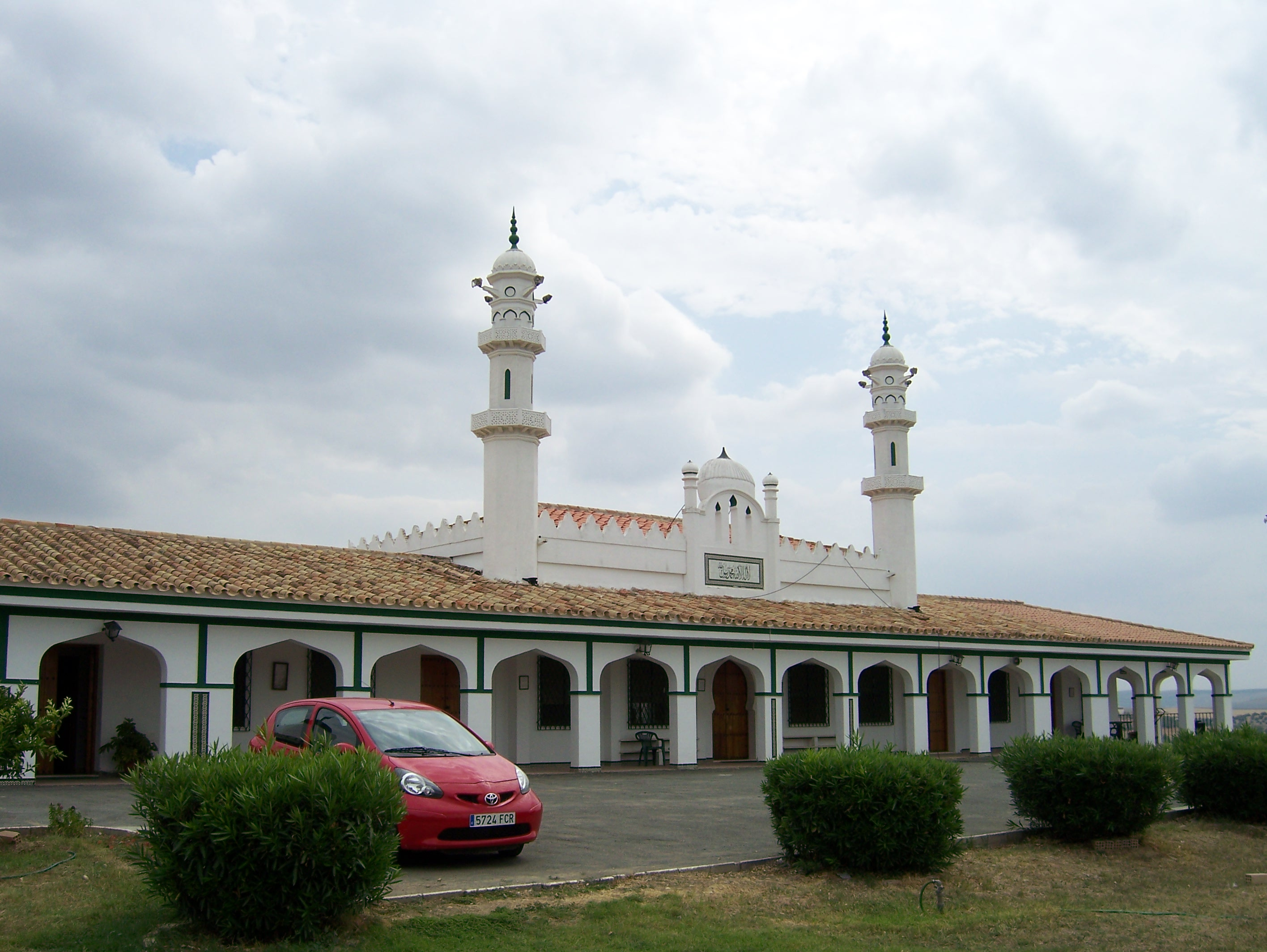

- The Basharat Mosque, constructed and run by the islamic movement Ahmadiyya Muslim Community.

== See also ==
- List of municipalities in Córdoba
