= Ahmadiyya in the United Kingdom =

Islamic movement in the United Kingdom

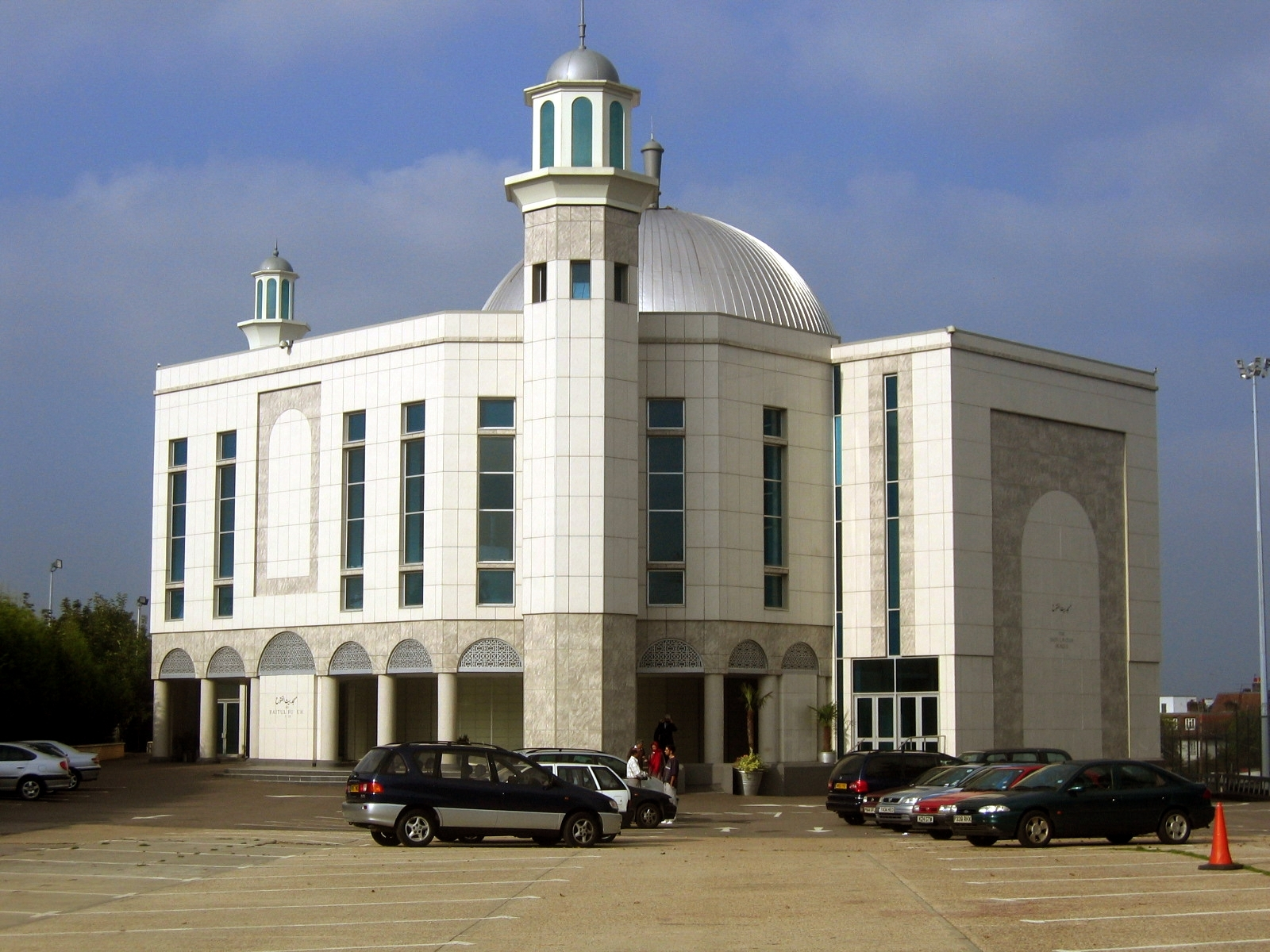
The Baitul Futuh Mosque in London, the largest mosque in the UK, and one of the largest in Western Europe.

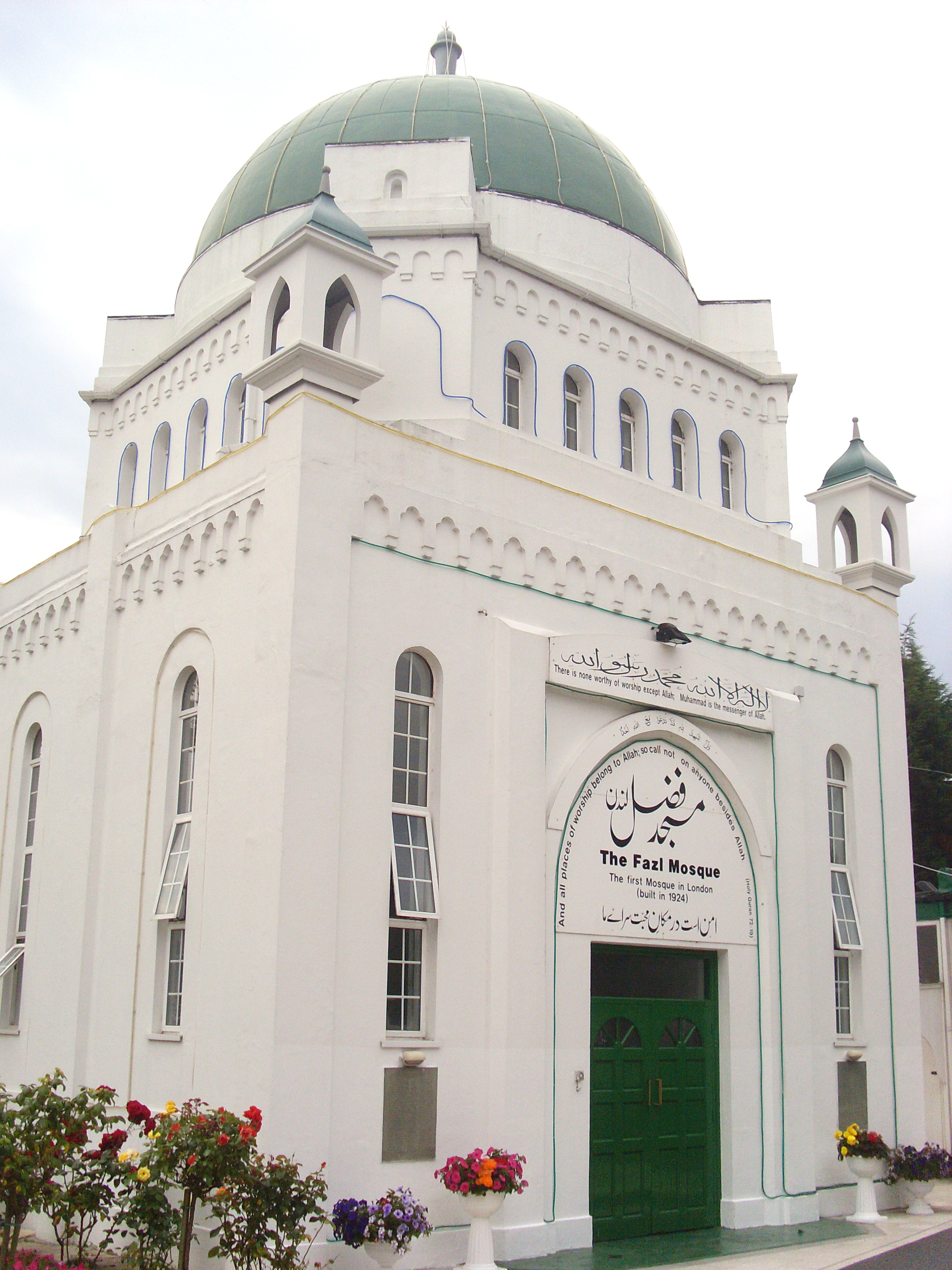
The Fazl Mosque, also known as The London Mosque

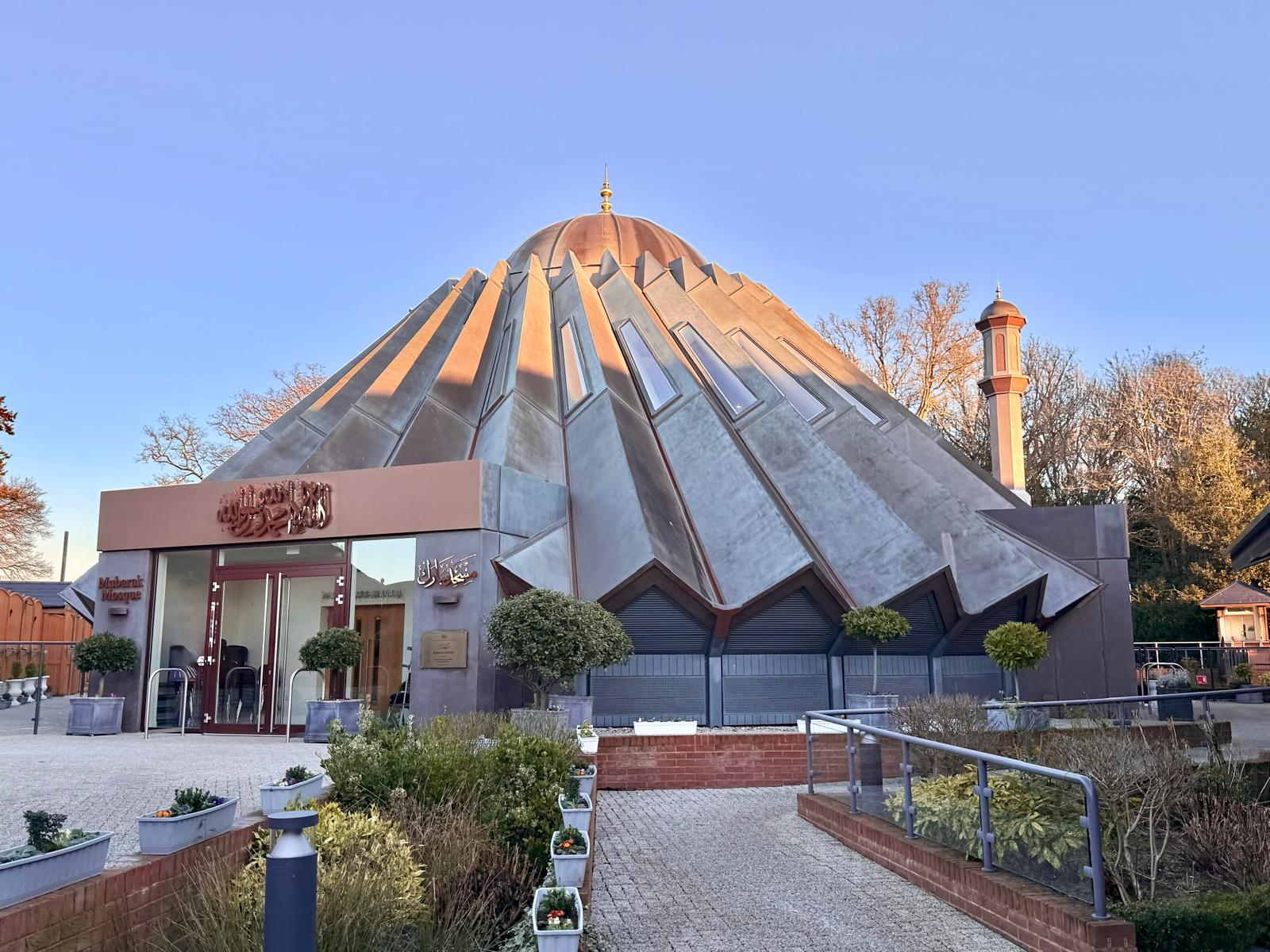
Mubarak Mosque, Tilford, the central mosque of the Ahmadiyya headquarters

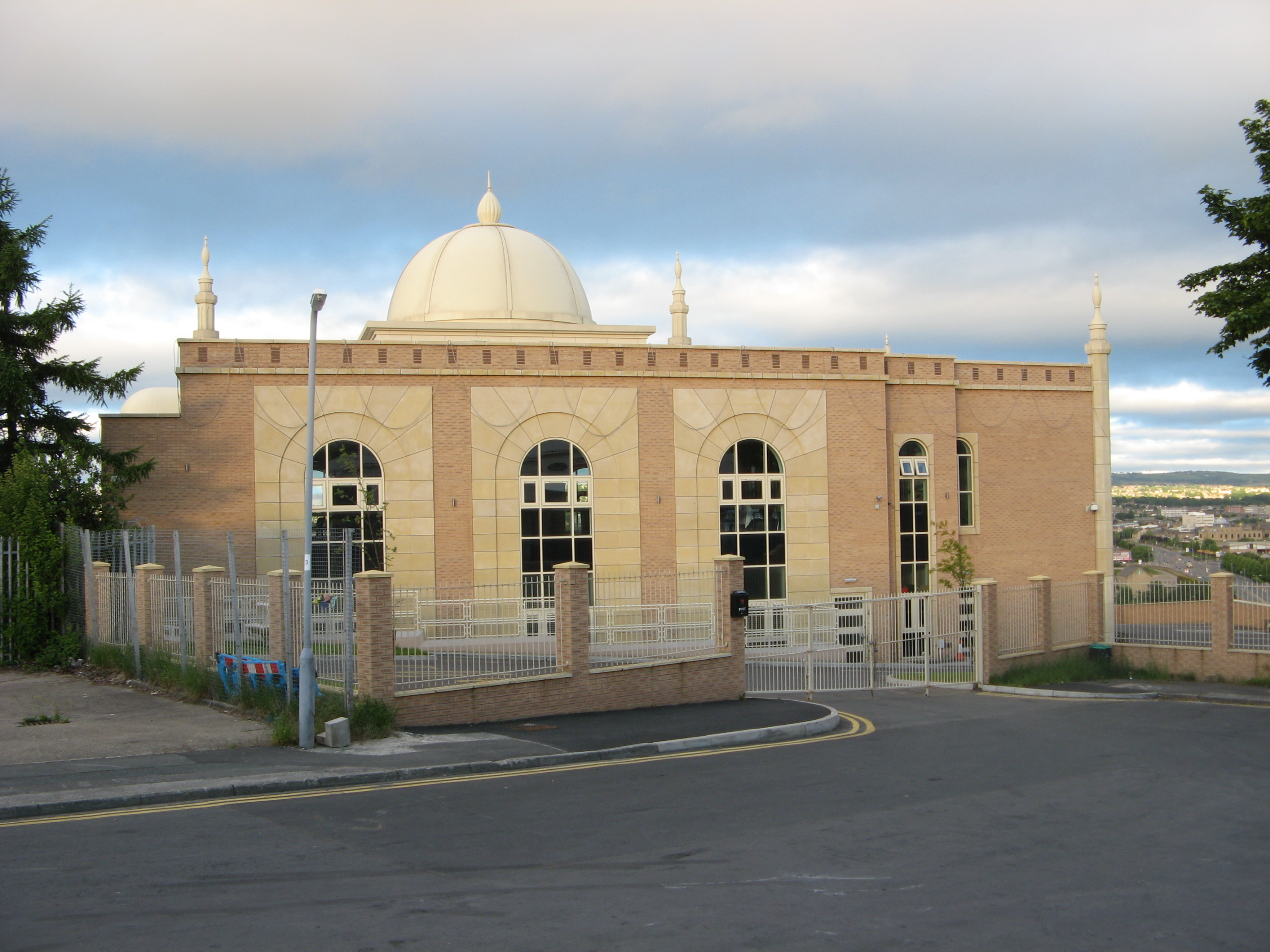
Al-Mahdi Mosque, Bradford, built in 2008

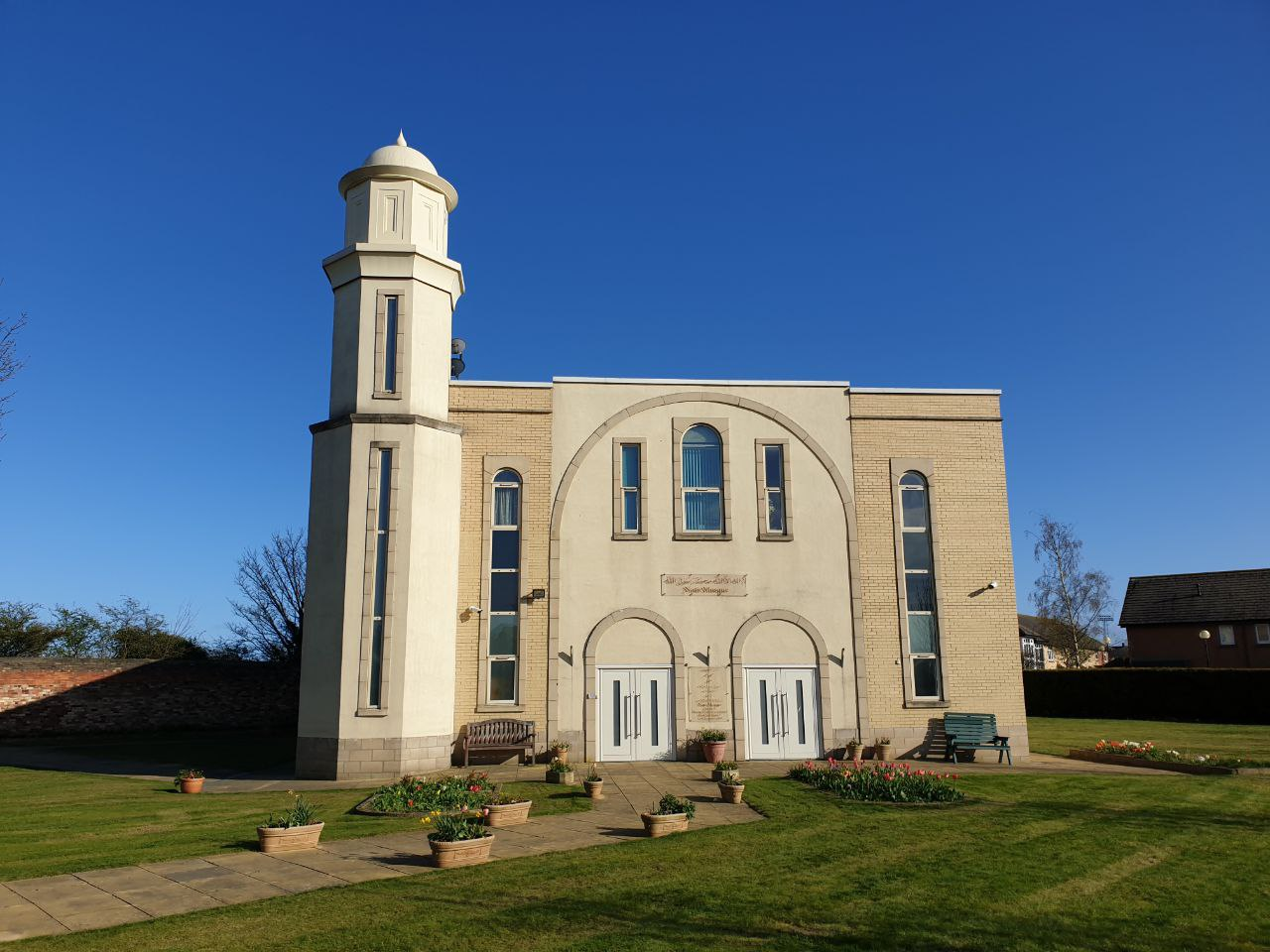
Nasir Mosque, Hartlepool, built in 2005

The Ahmadiyya Muslim Community was established in the United Kingdom in July 1913 as one of the oldest Islamic associations in the UK. The community has built its presence with the establishment of significant sites such as The London Mosque in 1926. Over the decades the community has grown and become known for its annual convention the Jalsa Salana, interfaith dialogues and humanitarian efforts. The UK has also served as the headquarters of the community since 1984 currently in Islamabad, Tilford, in Surrey.

== History ==
In July 1913, Fateh Muhammad Sial was the first missionary sent overseas by the Ahmadiyya Muslim Community and was under the direction of Hakeem Noor-ud-Din, the first caliph of the movement. Not many years after arriving, the need for a mosque in the UK became apparent and in 1926, the Fazl Mosque was formally opened in London and it became the city's first mosque. The community expanded and built many mosques and mission houses across the country. The most notable of which is Baitul Futuh Mosque in South London stands as one of the largest in Western Europe.

=== International Headquarters ===
Since the forced exile of the fourth caliph of the community, Mirza Tahir Ahmad from Pakistan in 1984, the Fazl Mosque, London served as International Headquarters for a period of 35 years before moving the International Headquarters to Mubarak Mosque, Tilford on 15 April 2019. It is also the centre for its international annual convention, the Jalsa Salana, which is held in Alton, Hampshire at Hadeeqatul Mahdi.

== Demographics ==
As of 2024, there are 35,000 Ahmadis in the UK in 150 local chapters. Presently, there are around 45 Mosques & community centres belonging to the Ahmadiyya Muslim Community in the UK, out of which around 25 are purpose-built mosques. Additionally, there are several centres across England which are used for Salat and events.

=== Mosques ===
The London Mosque was the first significant milestone for the Ahmadiyya Muslim Community in establishing a mosque in England. Several decades later, in 1975, the Nasir Hall, now known as the Nasir Mosque was established in Gillingham as a prayer center. As part of – Mirza Nasir Ahmad – the third caliph's visit to the UK, two centres were established; the mission house in Southall (which had a population of 40 Ahmadi families), as well as the Baitul Hamd in Bradford which was inaugurated in 1980. The first purpose-built mosque outside of London was the Nasir Mosque in Hartlepool (not to be conflated with the mosque in Gillingham).

No.	Mosque	City	Region	Year		Notes
No.	Mosque	City	Region	Established	Inaugurated	Notes
1	Mubarak Mosque	Tilford	Surrey	1984	2019	(51.19069°N 0.751°W)
2	Jamia UK	Haslemere	Surrey	2012 (Est).		(51.09416965°N 0.73723098°W)
3	Baitul Aman Mosque	Uxbridge	London	2012 (Est).		(51.5234°N 0.4661°W)
4	Baitul Ehsan Mosque	Mitcham	London	2017 (Inaug.)		(51.3913°N 0.1651°W)
5	Baitul Futuh Mosque	Morden	London	2003 (Built)		(51.3961°N 0.1989°W)
6	Baitus Subhan Mosque	Croydon	London	1993	2009	(51.3839°N 0.1038°W)
7	Baitul Hadi	Watford	Hertfordshire	Est.		(51.6424°N 0.4190°W)
8	Baitul Wahid Mosque	Feltham	Middlesex	2012 (Est.)		(51.4307°N 0.4028°W)
9	Darus Salaam Mosque	Southall	Middlesex	1980	2020	(51.5100°N 0.3731°W)
10	Fazl Mosque	Southfields	London	1926 (Built)		(51.4511°N 0.2075°W)
11	Noor Mosque	Crawley	West Sussex	2014 (Est.)		(51.126°N 0.193°W)
12	Tahir Mosque	Bromley	South	2012 (Est.)		(51.4339°N 0.0099°E)
13	Baitul Ahad Mosque	Newham	East London	2010 (Inaug.)		(51.533891°N 0.039033°E)
14	Baitul Ahad	Waltham Forest	East London	1984		(51.587398°N 0.026878°W)
15	Nasir Mosque	Gillingham	East London	1975	2014	(51.39481427°N 0.5511943°E)
16	Baitul Ehsan Mosque	Leamington Spa	East Midlands	2008 (Est.)		(52.288608°N 1.541299°W)
17	Baitul Hafeez Mosque	Nottingham	East Midlands	2001 (Est.)	2018	(52.955939°N 1.116966°W)
18	Baitul Ikram Mosque	Leicester	East Midlands	1993	2016	(52.61454466°N 1.1192681°W)
19	Baitus Suboor	Burton upon Trent	East Midlands	2024 (Est.)		(52.806102°N 1.606758°W)
20	Baitul Ata Mosque	Wolverhampton	West Midlands	2012 (Inaug.)		(52.583175°N 2.101566°W)
21	Darul Barakaat Mosque	Birmingham	West Midlands	1998	2004	(52.4767°N 1.8651°W)
22	Baitul Muqeet Mosque	Walsall	West Midlands	2009	2018	(52.580523°N 1.982831°W)
23	Baitul Ghafoor Mosque	Dudley	West Midlands	2012 (Inaug.)		(52.464112°N 2.029302°W)
24	Al-Mahdi Mosque	Bradford	North East	2000	2008	(53.8011°N 1.7444°W)
25	Baitul Hamd	Bradford	North East	1980 (Inaug.)		(53.79241545°N 1.72915579°W)
26	Baitul Haleem	Keighley	North East	<2008 (Est.)		(53.864071°N 1.906414°W)
27	Nasir Mosque	Hartlepool	North East	2005 (Built)		(54.6931°N 1.2162°W)
28	Baitul Ata	Newcastle upon Tyne	North East	2025 (Est.)		(54.99261°N 1.53974°W)
29	Darul Amaan Mosque	Manchester	North West	1991	2012	(53.46227002°N 2.23944977°W)
30	Sadiq Mosque	Rhyl, Wales	North West	2014 (Est).		(53.314946°N 3.498081°W)
31	Baitul Lateef Mosque	Liverpool	North West	2015 (Est.)		(53.42454°N 2.95536°W)
32	Baitur Rasheed	Blackburn	North West	2021 (Est.)		(53.744219°N 2.504511°W)
33	Baitul Aziz	Bolton	North West	2024 (Est).		(53.601655°N 2.549316°W)
34	Baitul Afiyat Mosque	Sheffield	Yorkshire	2006	2008	(53.3876091°N 1.45069153°W)
35	Baitul Atta Mosque	Spen Valley	Yorkshire	1990s	?	(53.705805°N 1.653444°W)
36	Baitul Baseer	Doncaster	Yorkshire	2023 (Est.)		(53.484894°N 1.188574°W)
37	Baitus Salaam Mosque	Scunthorpe	Yorkshire	2002	2023	(53.58628°N 0.67371°W)
38	Baitul Tauhid Mosque	Huddersfield	Yorkshire	2008	–	Currently being renovated and rebuilt (53.66240548°N 1.78558773°W)
39	Baitul Samad	Huddersfield	Yorkshire	c. 1980s		(53.65102261°N 1.77967223°W)
40	Bait-ur-Rahman Mosque	Glasgow	Scotland	1984	1985	(55.866022°N 4.290068°W)
41	Bait-ul-Mahmood Mosque	Dundee	Scotland	?		(56.472461°N 2.968935°W)
42	Baitur Raheem Mosque	Cardiff, Wales	South West	2014 (Note: April 2014)	2025 (Note: November 2025)	(51.47945139°N 3.21368848°W)

Locations of major Ahmadi Muslim Mosques in the UK

== Media and culture ==
=== Television & Radio ===
The Ahmadiyya Muslim community first began its media broadcasts in 1992 with Ahmadiyya Muslim Presentations (AMP), a part-time channel which would broadcast the weekly sermons of the caliph. This evolved into the 24-hour TV channel, now known as MTA1 World as the first Islamic TV channel in the UK in 1994. It was launched on the Sky UK platform and operated from The London Mosque. Since then, it has launched several other channels around the world while maintaining the Baitul Futuh Mosque as its headquarters. In early 2016, the community launched the Voice of Islam radio channel which covers several cities across the UK, including Greater London and Greater Manchester.

=== Periodicals ===
The community publishes several magazines and newspapers aimed for the benefit of the community. The two main newspapers run by the community in the UK are the Daily Al-Fazl in Urdu and Al Hakam, an English periodical. The Daily Al-Fazl started an international service in 1994, where it was published in Islamabad, Tilford, and in 2023 it became as the permanent headquarters of the periodical. In addition to these, auxiliaries magazines are published by the auxiliary organisations of the community such as the Ansaruddin magazine, published by Ansarullah and the Maryam magazine and An-Nusrat magazine, published by Lajna Ima'illah.

== Discrimination ==
The movement, though free to practice their faith in the UK, suffers from Sunni bigotry in the UK. It has faced instances of persecution of discrimination over the past century with instances of 'Anti-Ahmadiyya campaigns'. They are not recognised as Muslims by the Muslim Council of Britain and are targets for vilification by the Khatme Nubuwwat Academy. The movement has faced objections and resistance of the establishment of Ahmadi mosques by anti-Ahmadis, fuelled by sectarian hostility. Ahmadi students face discrimination in educational settings and workplaces. In 2016 Asad Shah, an Ahmadi shopkeeper was murdered due to his association with the Ahmadiyya faith, in which the killer claimed to have defended Islam over Shah's alleged blasphemies.

== Notable Ahmadi Residents ==
- Mirza Masroor Ahmad – Fifth Caliph and current leader of the worldwide Ahmadiyya Muslim Community
- Mirza Tahir Ahmad – Fourth Caliph during his time the Community's headquarters moved to United Kingdom from Pakistan.
- Dr. Abdus Salam - First Muslim Nobel Science Laureate and a devoted member of the community, lived in Putney, London
- Tariq Ahmad, Baron Ahmad of Wimbledon – Member of the House of Lords, UK, Minister of State for the Commonwealth and South Asia and Prime Minister’s Special Representative on Preventing Sexual Violence in Conflict
- Iftikhar A. Ayaz – Tuvaluan Consular Official, UK
- Abdul Rahim Dard – writer, missionary, Imam of the historic Fazl Mosque and political activist for the Pakistan Movement
- Fateh Muhammad Sial – the first Ahmadi missionary sent overseas by Ahmadiyya Muslim Community
- Bashir Ahmad Orchard – first Missionary of the Ahmadiyya Muslim Community of European descent
- Karim Ahmad Khan – Prosecutor of the International Criminal Court since 2021.
