= Nasir Mosque =

Nasir Mosque (مسجد ناصر) may refer to:

- Nasir Mosque, Gothenburg, the first mosque in Sweden and Scandinavia
- Nasir Mosque, Gillingham, a mosque in Gillingham, Kent, England
- Nasir Mosque, Hartlepool, a mosque in Hartlepool, County Durham, England

== See also ==
- Nasir
