= Baitur Raheem Mosque =

Mosque in Cardiff, Wales

- مسجد بیت الرحیم
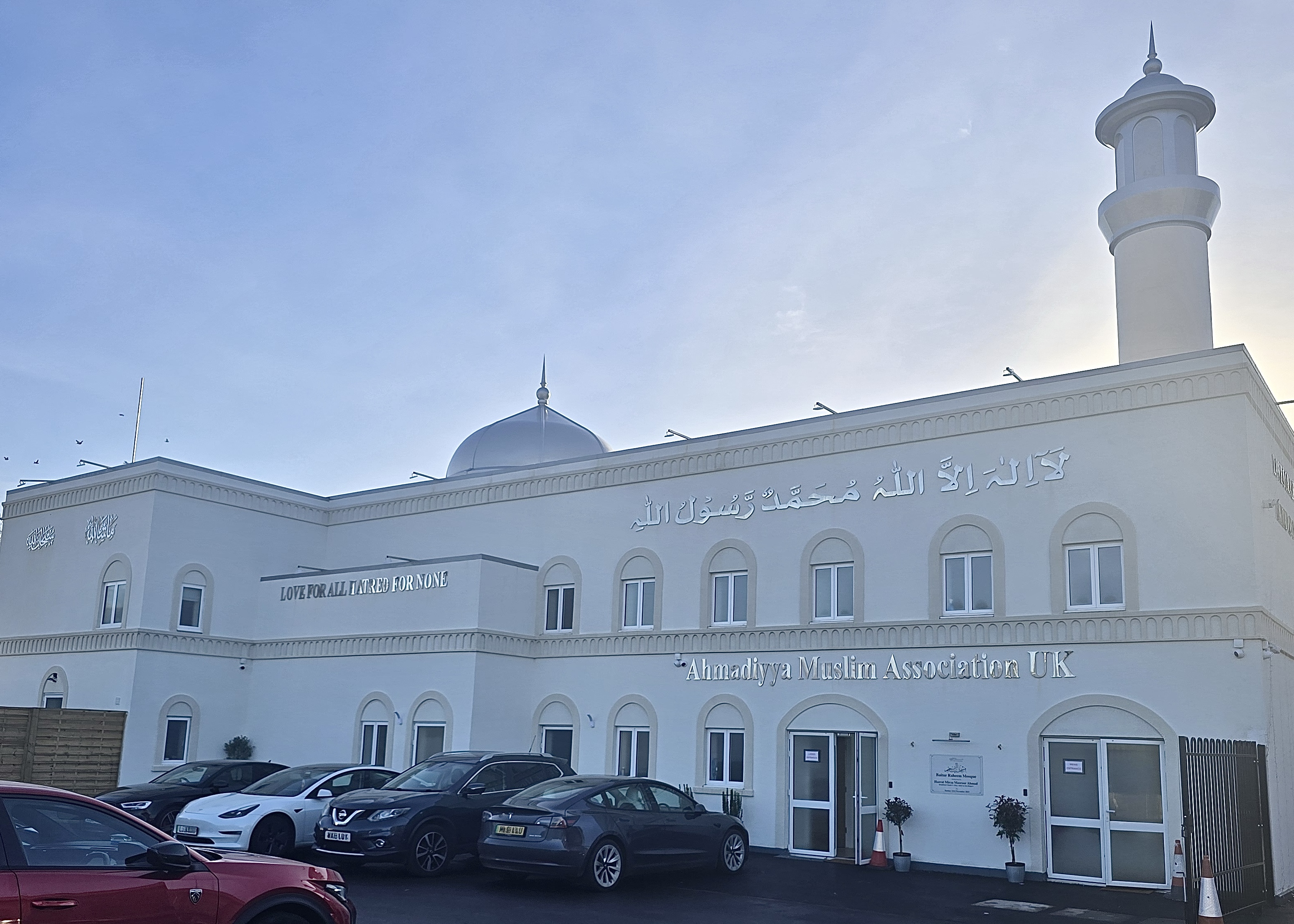

Religion
- Affiliation: Islam
- Branch/tradition: Ahmadiyya

Location
- Location: Sanatorium Rd, Cardiff CF11 8DG
- Interactive map of Baitur Raheem Mosque
- Coordinates: 51°28′46.1″N 3°12′49.7″W

Architecture
- Type: mosque
- Style: Islamic
- Established: 2014
- Completed: 2025

Specifications
- Capacity: 550
- Dome: 1
- Minaret: 1
- Minaret height: 17m
- Site area: 1,200 m^{2} (13,000 sq ft)

Baitur Raheem Mosque (Note: Welsh: Mosg Beitur Rahîm) (English: House of the Merciful) is a purpose-built mosque in the Canton area of Cardiff, Wales, located on Sanatorium Road. It is the first purpose-built Ahmadi mosque in Wales which was inaugurated on 23 November 2025. It is a two-storey complex built on a 1,200 square metres (13,000 sq ft) site with a capacity of 550 worshippers.

== History ==
Plans for a dedicated Ahmadiyya mosque in Cardiff were first proposed in the early 2010s, following which a site was acquired in the Canton, Cardiff, where a prayer centre was established back in 2014 when it was bought as former warehouses at a cost of £350,000. The history of Ahmadiyya in Wales dates to the early 20th century with Welsh converts to Ahmadiyya. The construction of the mosque was planned and led by the elder association of the community, Majlis Ansarullah, the second of the kind after Nasir Mosque in Hartlepool in 2005, with the foundation stone laid on 9 September 2023.

=== Controversies ===
Preliminary proposals submitted by the community to the local council for a purpose-built mosque were refused following objections by the local community, initially on the bases of "traffic concerns". In October 2016, leaflet campaigns, such as 'No mosque' leafletting were carried out against the proposal, and the council received around 60 letters and over 500 signatures objecting to the development.

During the same year, a Labour councillor, Sue White, resigned over alleged bullying and racial discrimination over her support for the Ahmadiyya Muslim Community, two days prior to another councillor, Manzoor Ahmed, leaving the Labour Party. The following year, Labour councillor Ali Ahmed was accused of misleading the planning committee, over the extent of the community's beliefs and demographics.

=== Inauguration ===
The mosque was inaugurated by the head of the Ahmadiyya Muslim Community, Mirza Masroor Ahmad on 23 November 2025. The reception held in commemoration of the inauguration of the mosque was attended by local and national guests, political and faith leaders such as High Sheriff of Glamorgan and councillors, among other guests.

== Architecture ==
The mosque consists of a central dome and one minaret with a height of 17 meters. The mosque is divided in to three halls, including a central prayer hall which accommodates 270 worshippers, a community hall and a lower hall.

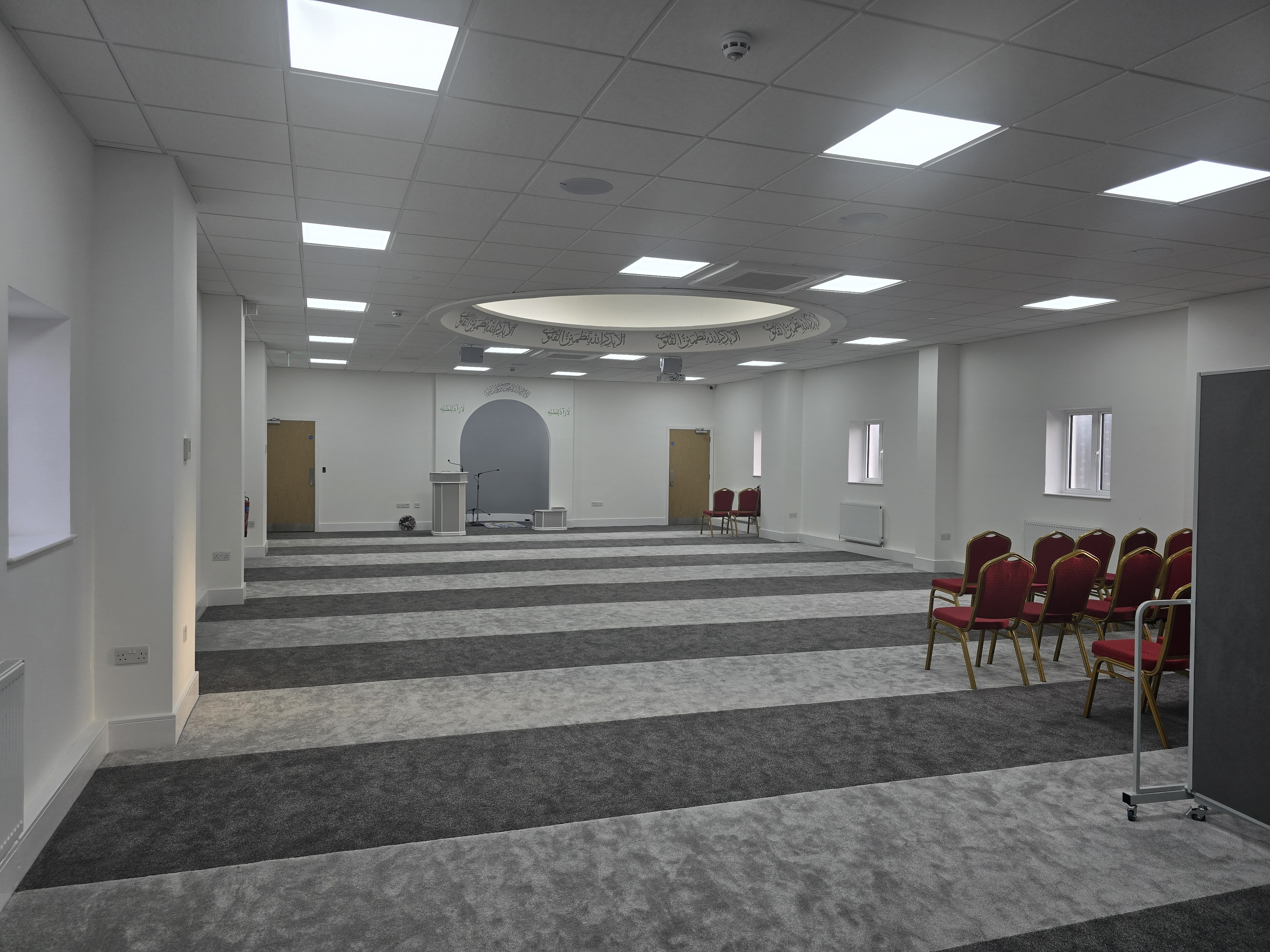
Central prayer hall

== See also ==
- Ahmadiyya in the UK
- List of Ahmadiyya buildings and structures
- Islam in the UK
