= Bashir Ahmad Orchard =

Bashir Ahmad Orchard (April 26, 1920 – July 8, 2002; born James Bryan Orchard) was an English convert to Ahmadiyya Islam and the first European Ahmadi Muslim missionary

== Life ==
Orchard was born in Torquay and was brought up within a Christian household. He joined the British Indian Army in 1942 and became a lieutenant. He was a member of the Church of England at the time and had a brother who was a Roman Catholic priest. During his service in India, an Ahmadi officer from his unit taught him about Islam and the Ahmadiyya movement. While stationed at Manipur, a good 1000 miles from Qadian, the Ahmadi headquarters, this officer, Abdur Rahman Dehlvi, arranged for a copy of The Philosophy of the Teachings of Islam by Mirza Ghulam Ahmad to be sent to Orchard from Qadian. Later, Orchard used his army leave to visit Qadian where he met the Caliph, Mirza Bashir-ud-Din Mahmud Ahmad and was much impressed, describing him as 'an embodiment of energetic repose radiating physical, intellectual and spiritual magnetism which captivated all in his presence'. Shortly after his visit to Qadian, as his unit advanced towards Burma, Orchard signed the form of Bay'ah (allegiance) and sent it to Qadian, thus formally joining the Ahmadiyya movement, and adopted the Arabic name Bashir (bringer of glad tidings) in 1945. At the time of his conversion Orchard had a vivid dream in which he met the Caliph and received advice from him. On demobilization in 1946 Orchard offered his services to the London branch of the Ahmadiyya movement and was appointed by the Caliph as a missionary. In 1949 he came to Glasgow where he stayed for three years, before going to the West Indies. He returned to Glasgow in 1966, where he stayed for the next 17 years. He moved to continue working, first in Oxford, and later London. While, associated with the London Mosque (London Muslim Mission), Orchard was the editor of the monthly Review of Religions. In his later years, he travelled to Mecca and performed the hajj pilgrimage.

== See also ==
- Ahmadiyya in the United Kingdom
- The Review of Religions
- List of converts to Islam
