= Darul Barakaat Mosque =

Mosque in Birmingham, England, United Kingdom

- مسجد دار البراکات
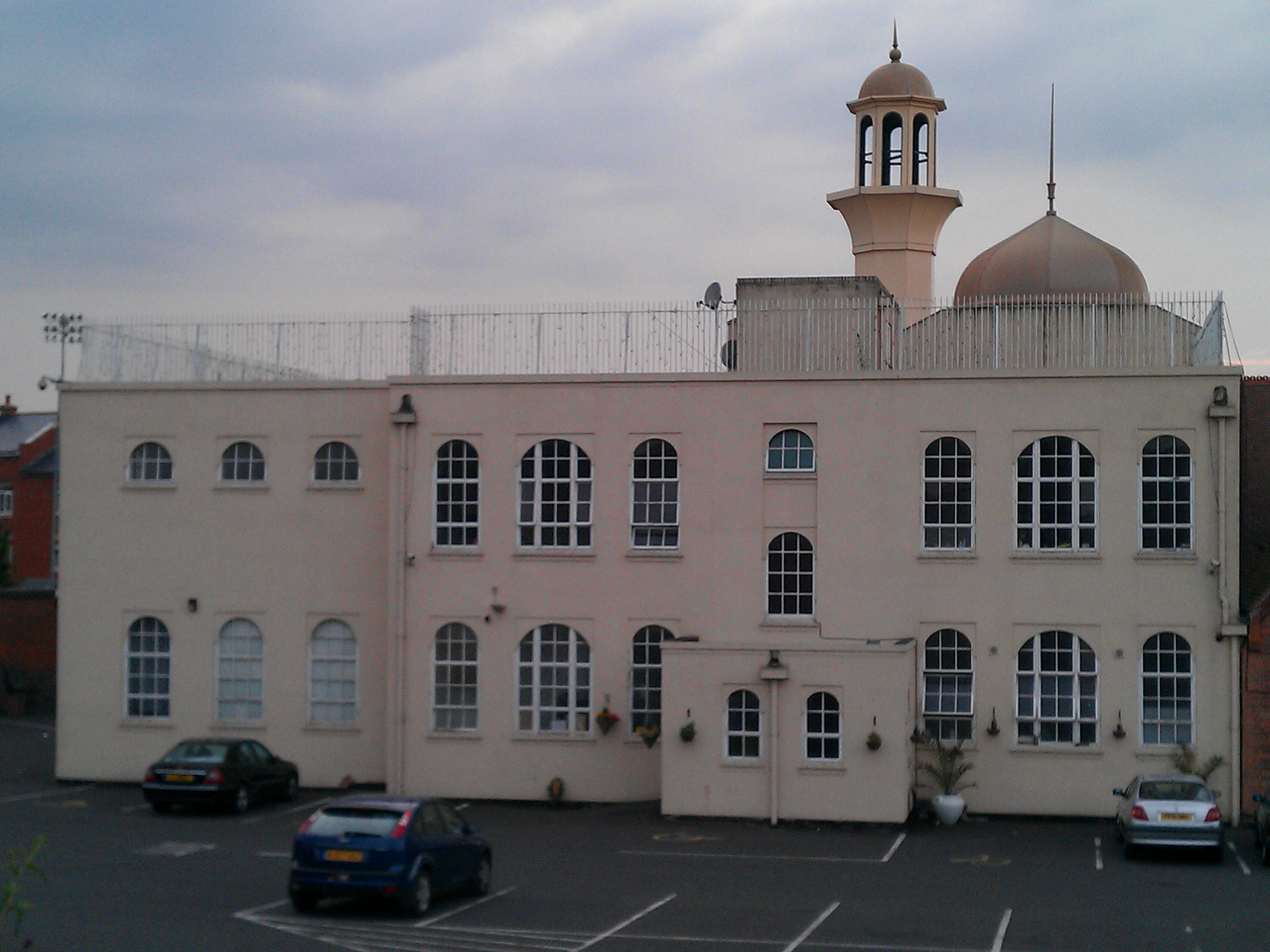

Religion
- Affiliation: Ahmadiyya

Location
- Location: Bordesley, Birmingham, England
- Interactive map of Darul Barakaat Mosque
- Coordinates: 52°28′36.2″N 1°51′54.5″W

Architecture
- Type: mosque
- Completed: 2004
- Construction cost: £ 1.6 million

Specifications
- Capacity: 1000 (prayer hall); 2000 (total, inc. external halls)
- Dome: 1
- Minaret: 1

The Darul Barakaat ("Abode of Blessings") is a large mosque in Bordesley, Birmingham, England. It was built in 2004, and can accommodate 1000 worshippers, with a further 1000 worshippers in the adjoining halls.

== History ==
The area were the mosque stands upon was used as a primary school for girls back in 1889, and continued to do so until it became derelict in the 1970s. The site was bought for £200 by the Ahmadiyya Muslim Community in 1996 and was inaugurated by Mirza Masroor Ahmad in 2004.

== See also ==
- Islam in England
- Ahmadiyya in the United Kingdom
- List of mosques in the United Kingdom
