= Islamabad, Tilford =

Muslim community site in Surrey, England

Coordinates: 51°11′29″N 0°45′07″W

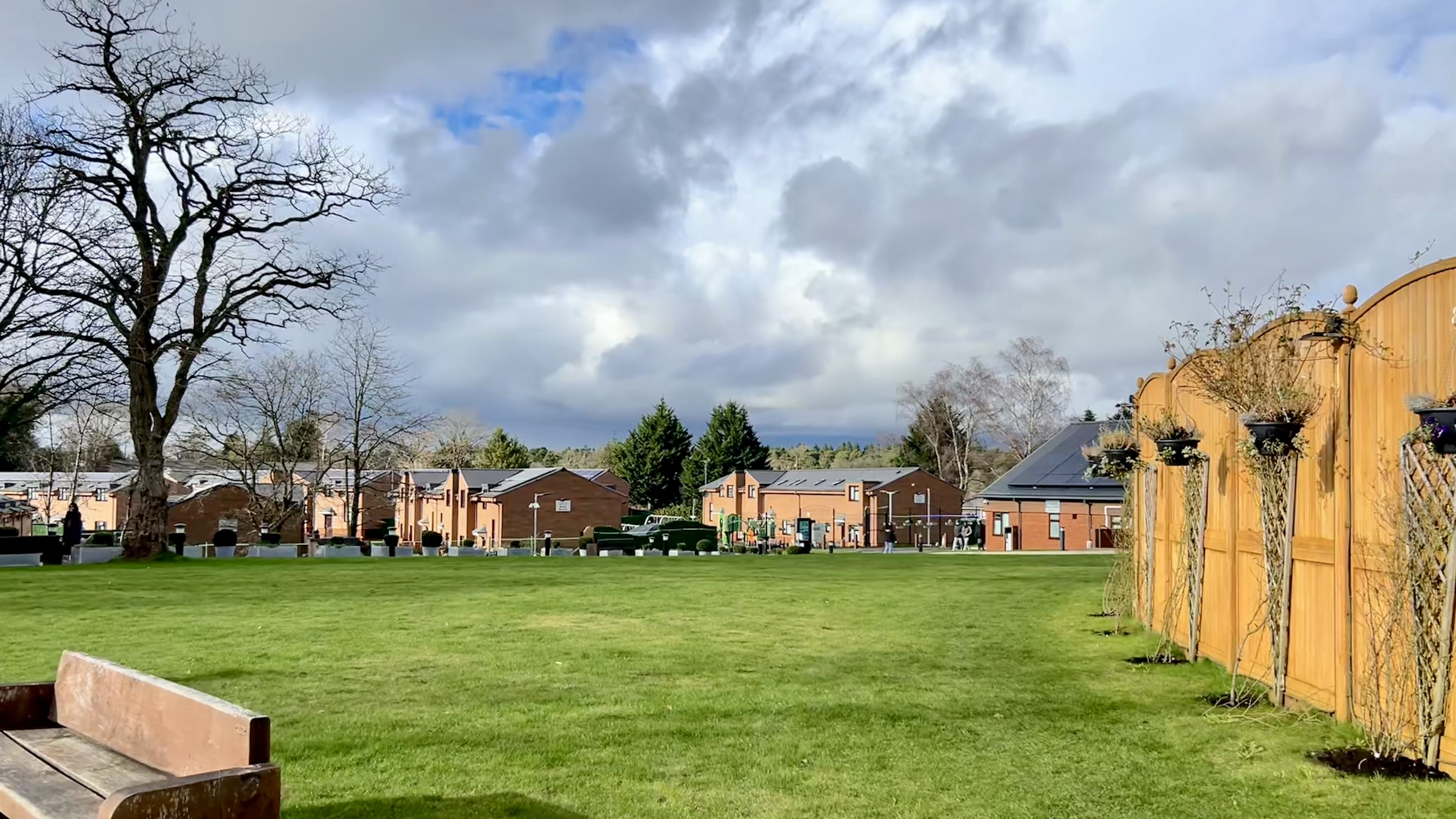
Islamabad residences and offices as seen from the Mubarak Mosque

Islamabad (Note: Urdu: اِسْلَام آباد، ٹِلْفورْڈ), in the village of Tilford, Surrey, England, is an estate which serves as the headquarters of the Ahmadiyya Muslim Community. Islamabad is 10.4 hectares in area, where four hectares are used for headquarter buildings, offices and residential housing. It is the resting place of Mirza Tahir Ahmad, the fourth caliph of the community.

== History ==
The site, located in the Sheephatch area of Tilford, was formerly an old boarding school, namely the Sheephatch Camp School, one of the 32 camp schools erected in 1939, designed by Thomas S Tait of Burnet, Tait & Lorne architects following the Camp Act 1939 until 1977. During the Second World War, the school had also served as an evacuees shelter for the Ruckholt Road Central School in Leyton and later closed in 1943. The camp was leased to Surrey County Council from National Camps Corporation in 1946 and maintained it as a co-educational boarding school until its closure in 1977. The land was sold for £80,000 but was again put up for sale and bought by the community back in September 1984 in an auction for around £423,000.

=== Jalsa Salana UK ===
It served as the Jalsa Gah, a site used to hold the annual convention Jalsa Salana until 2004, whereafter the Jalsa's were held in Hadeeqatul Mahdi, Alton. The first Jalsa took place in April, 1985.

=== Ahmadiyya Headquarters ===
The International Headquarters of the Ahmadiyya Muslim Community was previously set at The London Mosque and served for a period of 35 years since the fourth caliph of the community, Mirza Tahir Ahmad left Pakistan in 1984.

In April 2019, Mirza Masroor Ahmad, the fifth caliph of the community had indicated the site would become the new headquarters for the community, and soon after relocated and inaugurated the new site on Friday 17th May 2019. The formal inauguration of the mosque was held on 29 June 2019 in the presence of faith, civic and religious leaders. Around 300 guests were in attendance, including MP Dominic Grieve, former attorney general, MP Sir Ed Davey, chair of Tilford Parish Council Debra Lee, and former mayor of Farnham David Attfield.

=== Controversies ===
In September 2026, a number of widely circulated posts by far-right commentators falsely alleged Islamabad as a "parallel" community operating separately from wider British society. The social media coverage prompted responses from the Tilford parish council, local MP, Greg Stafford, and local residents condemning the hostile commentary and expressing support for the community and disputed claims being circulated about the site, highlighting the organisation’s charitable activities and contributions to the local community as well as its openness to schools, community groups and the local community.

== Facilities ==
As the headquarters of the community, the site accommodates many facilities including:

- Mubarak Mosque
- Residence of the Caliph.
- MTA International studio facilities
- Administrative buildings
- 32 additional residences
- Multi-purpose hall
- Equestrian centre
- Courtyard

== See also ==
- Ahmadiyya in the United Kingdom
- List of Ahmadiyya buildings and structures
