= Nasir Mosque, Gillingham =

Mosque in Gillingham, Kent, England

Nasir Mosque
- مسجد ناصر
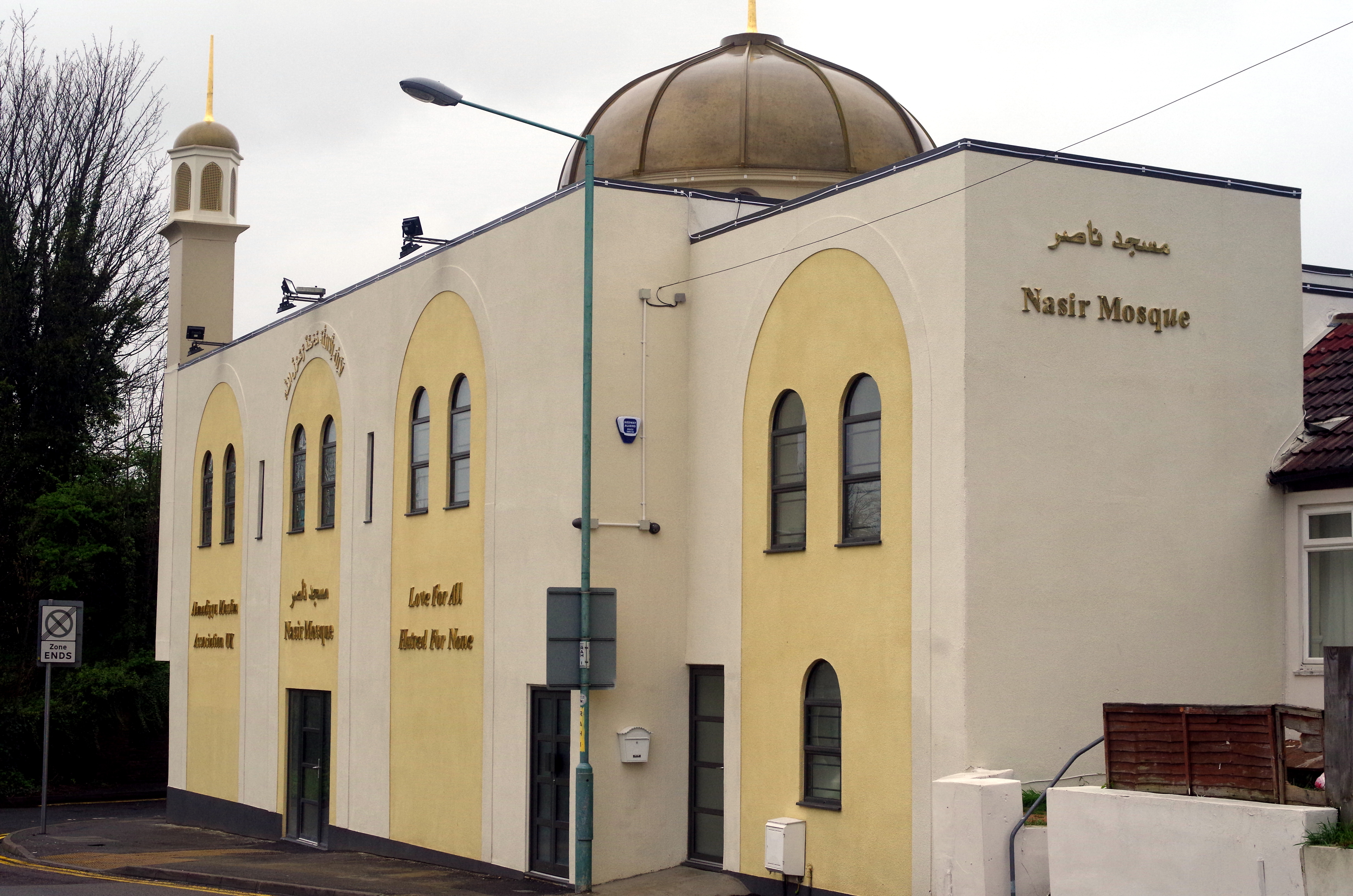

Religion
- Affiliation: Islam
- Branch/tradition: Ahmadiyya

Location
- Location: 113 Richmond Road, Gillingham, Kent
- Interactive map of Nasir Mosque
- Coordinates: 51°39′47.832″N 0°55′11.782″E

Architecture
- Type: mosque
- Style: Islamic
- Established: 1975
- Completed: 2014

Specifications
- Capacity: 300
- Dome: 1
- Minaret: 1

Nasir Mosque is a mosque in Gillingham, Kent, England. Located on Richmond Road, it was established in 1975 as Nasir Hall. It is among the earliest mosques established by the Ahmadiyya Muslim Community in the UK and can accommodate 300 worshippers.

The mosque regularly holds open-days and inter-faith events and serves as the sole purpose-built mosque in Kent.

== History ==
The mosque was established in 1975 as Nasir Hall, as a prayer centre and mission house for the community, inaugurated by then the fourth caliph, Mirza Tahir Ahmad. Prior to this, the building was utilised a community club.

The construction of the purpose-built mosque began in July 2012 with the demolition of the old building. The construction was funded fully by the donations of the members of the Ahmadiyya Muslim Community.

=== Inauguration ===
The mosque was inaugurated by the caliph of the community, Mirza Masroor Ahmad on 1 March 2014 along with a reception and dinner for the guests, including the local MP and Lord-Lieutenant and Lady De L'Isle.

=== Incidents ===
Since its inception, the mosque has faced several hate crimes by right-wing groups such as Britain First which threatened to 'run a big campaign' against the community if the planning permission was not withdrawn. In August 2024, a man was jailed over a racially aggravated attack against the mosque.

== Architecture ==
The mosque consists of a golden central dome and one minaret.

== Gallery ==
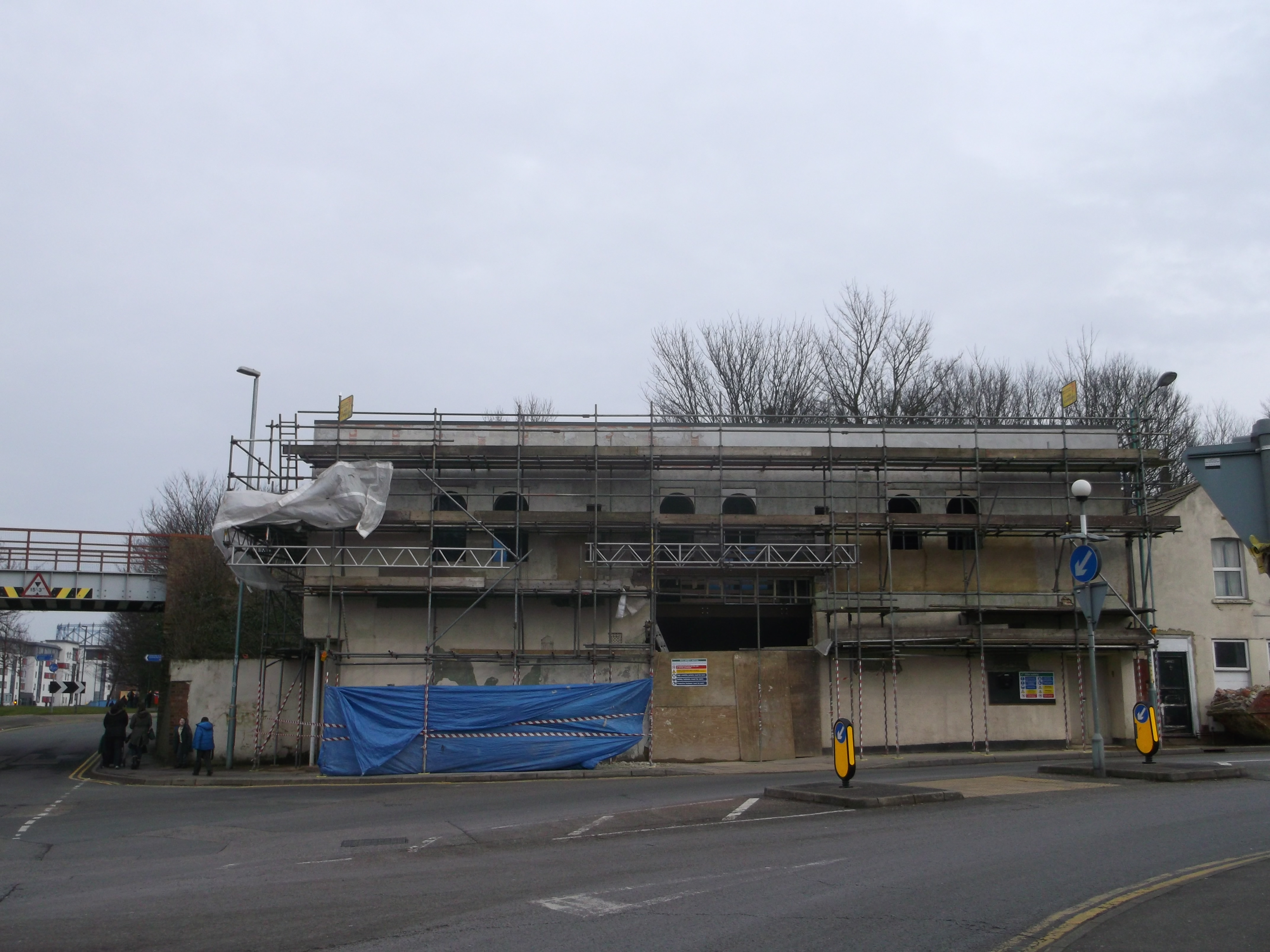
construction of the mosque

== See also ==
- Noor Mosque, Crawley
- Ahmadiyya in the UK
- List of Ahmadiyya buildings and structures
- Islam in the UK
