= Baitul Muqeet Mosque, Walsall =

Purpose-built mosque in Walsall, UK

Baitul Muqeet Mosque
- مسجد بیت المقیت

Religion
- Affiliation: Islam
- Branch/tradition: Ahmadiyya

Location
- Location: 22 Vicarage Pl, Walsall WS1 3NA
- Interactive map of Baitul Muqeet Mosque
- Coordinates: 52°34′49.8″N 1°58′58.2″W

Architecture
- Type: mosque
- Style: Islamic
- Established: 2009
- Completed: 2018
- Construction cost: £500,000

Specifications
- Capacity: 400
- Dome: 1
- Minaret: 1

The Baitul Muqeet (English: House of the Maintainer) is a purpose-built mosque in Walsall, England, which was formally inaugurated on the 12 May 2018. Located on a former industrial site on Vicarage Place in Caldmore, it has a capacity of 400 worshippers. The mosque holds regular community and interfaith events.

== History ==
The mosque was initially founded as a community centre in the former disused warehouses when it was bought by the Ahmadiyya Muslim Community back in 2009 for £250,000. The community has roots in Walsall dating back approximately 50 years, in around the 1960s consisting of few Ahmadi families.

In December 2009, plans emerged to redevelop the community centre as a purpose-built mosque as proposals were submitted to the Walsall Council, initiating a process that ultimately lasted almost a decade.

=== Inauguration ===
The mosque was inaugurated on 12 May 2018 by the head of the community, Mirza Masroor Ahmad, and a formal reception was held later in the evening with local residents and various dignitaries to mark the opening. Due to safety threats, the inauguration was safeguarded with police presence.

=== Opposition ===
The proposals for the mosque were vehemently opposed by mainly the local Sunni muslims as the planning application, submitted in 2009, initially received over 800 signatures against the proposals spanning over four petitions, and hundreds of protestors at the town hall. Due to the opposition, the planning application was refused which was overturned in 2010 following an appeal by the community. Plan were resubmitted again in 2012 with alteractions, due to time limit having lapsed.

== Architecture ==
The construction of the mosque cost £500,000 and includes a dome and a minaret.

== See also ==
- List of mosques in the United Kingdom
- Ahmadiyya in the United Kingdom
- Islam in the United Kingdom
