= Baitul Hamd (Bradford) =

Coordinates: 53.792410729510934°N 1.7291702248660217°W

- بیت الحمد
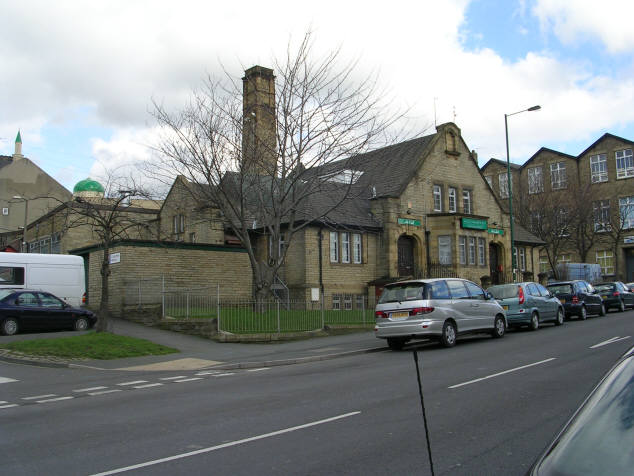

- Location in Northern England

Religion
- Affiliation: Islam
- Branch/tradition: Ahmadiyya

Location
- Location: 393 Leeds Road, Bradford BD3 9LY
- Country: England
- Interactive map of Baitul Hamd

Architecture
- Established: 1980
- Capacity: 200

The Baitul Hamd (English: A Praiseworthy Place) is a mosque located on Leeds Road in Bradford, England. It is one of the oldest mosques of the Ahmadiyya Muslim Community in the UK. It was formally inaugurated on 2 October 1980 by Mirza Nasir Ahmad, the third caliph of the community and can accommodate around 200 worshippers.

== History ==
The mosque was previously a Victorian Bath House before being converted into a mosque, bought at a cost of £31,000 from the council. Initially, the mosque was in a state of deterioration before being repaired and renovated into use. Following its renovation it served as the mission house for the community in Bradford.

== Architecture ==
On the front of the mosque, two attributes of God have been engraved in Arabic: ألْعِزّةُ لِله, romanized: 'al-'izzatu-lillāh and ألْعَظْمَةُ لِله, 'al-'aẓmatu-lillāh as well as the Shahada in the centre.

== Facilities ==
The mosque contains prayer halls, as well as a sports hall (renovated from the swimming pool from the former Victorian Bath House).

== See also ==
- Al Mahdi Mosque, Bradford
- Ahmadiyya in the United Kingdom
