= Mubarak Mosque, Tilford =

Mosque in England and headquarters of Ahmadiyya faith

Mubarak Mosque
- مسجد مبارک
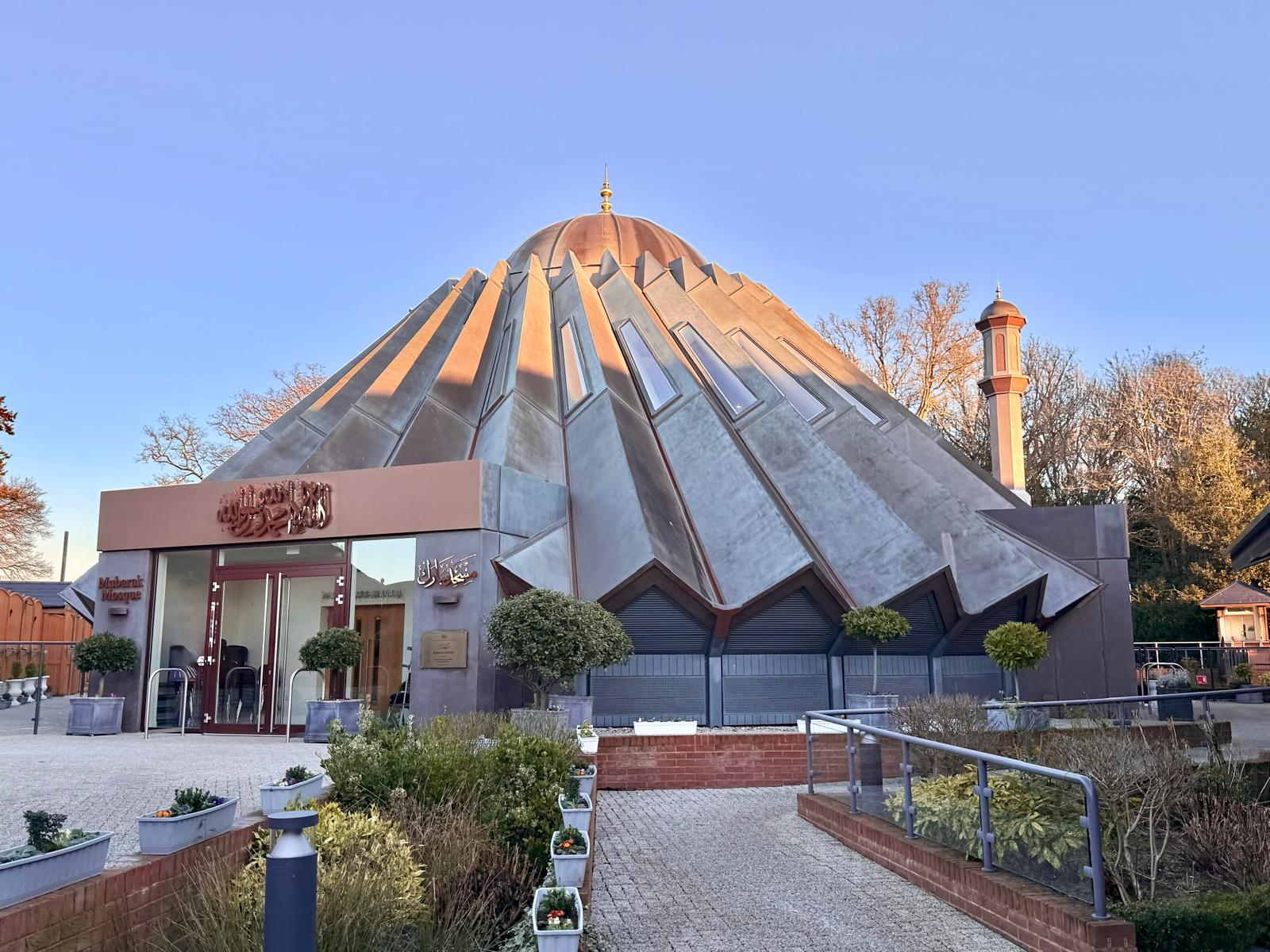

Religion
- Affiliation: Islam
- Branch/tradition: Ahmadiyya

Location
- Location: Tilford, Surrey, England
- Interactive map of Mubarak Mosque
- Administration: Ahmadiyya Muslim Community
- Coordinates: 51°11′26.5″N 0°45′3.6″W

Architecture
- Type: Mosque
- Completed: 2019

Specifications
- Capacity: 500 (up to 2,000 with neighbouring halls)
- Dome: 1
- Minaret: 2
- Minaret height: 13m

Website
- Official website

The Mubarak Mosque (English: The Blessed Mosque) is a mosque in Tilford, Surrey, England, on the site of the international headquarters of the Ahmadiyya Muslim Community, formally known as Islamabad, Tilford. It was inaugurated on Friday 17 May 2019 by Mirza Masroor Ahmad, the fifth caliph of the Ahmadiyya Muslim Community.

== History ==
The place was established as Sheephatch Camp School, one of the 32 camp schools erected in 1939, designed by Thomas S Tait of Burnet, Tait & Lorne architects following the Camp Act 1939. During World War II, it was used as wartime evacuation centre for Ruckholt Road Central School in Leyton and later closed in 1943.

=== Original building ===
The land was sold for £80,000 but was again put on auction in 1984 and bought by Ahmadiyya Muslim Association. The original mosque which was established in the original barracks was named as "Bait-us-Salam" (Note: Urdu: بیت السلام) (The House of Peace) and the first prayer was led by Mirza Tahir Ahmad, the fourth caliph. In 2015, Waverley Council granted building permission for a new mosque and other facilities on the 10.3 hectares (25 acres) site and a complete modernisation of the facilities.

=== Inauguration ===
The formal inauguration of the mosque was held on 29 June 2019 in the presence of faith, civic and religious leaders. Around 300 guests were in attendance, including MP Dominic Grieve, former attorney general, MP Sir Ed Davey, chair of Tilford Parish Council Debra Lee, and former mayor of Farnham David Attfield.

== Architecture ==
The mosque building consists of one dome and 32 fins including a glazed window in each fin. The mosque has two minarets standing just over 13m high with each minaret having a gilded finials.

== See also ==
- The London Mosque (Fazl Mosque)
- Ahmadiyya in the United Kingdom
- Islam in the United Kingdom
- Islamic architecture
- List of Ahmadiyya buildings and structures
