= Baitul Ikram Mosque, Leicester =

Mosque in Leicester, England

Coordinates: 52.61455879717727°N 1.1193150882670628°W

Baitul Ikram Mosque
- مسجد بیت الاکرام
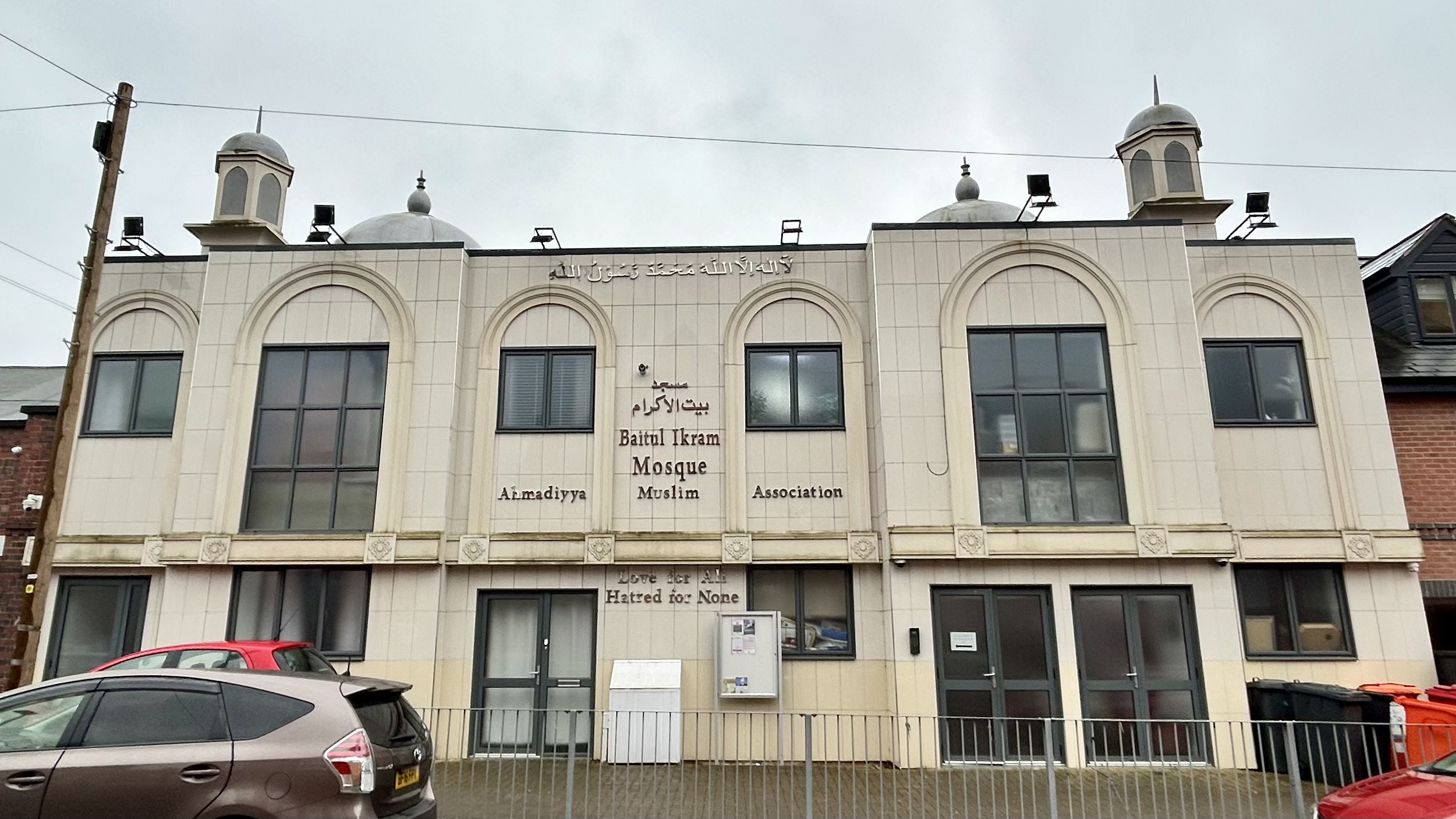

- Location in East Midlands

Religion
- Affiliation: Islam
- Branch/tradition: Ahmadiyya

Location
- Location: 95 Avenue Road Extension, Leicester, LE2 3EQ
- Country: England
- Interactive map of Baitul Ikram Mosque

Architecture
- Completed: February 20, 2016

Specifications
- Capacity: 300
- Dome: 2
- Minaret: 2

The Baitul Ikram (English: A Noble Place) is a mosque located in Leicester, England. It is the first purpose-built Ahmadi mosque in East Midlands and was inaugurated on 20 February 2016. It has a capacity for 300 worshippers.

== History ==
The mosque was originally founded as a prayer centre in a former ambulance station, which was bought back in the mid-1990s. The building adjacent was bought and plans were made to convert the prayer centre into an official purpose-built mosque. For the conversion, £1 million was raised by the local members of the Ahmadiyya Muslim Community.

=== Inauguration ===
The mosque was inaugurated by the head of the Ahmadiyya community, Mirza Masroor Ahmad who unveiled the plaque. Other dignitaries and special guests such as the chief constable, deputy lieutenant, local MPs attended the inauguration of the mosque.

=== Peace conferences ===
The mosque has been the venue of the annual peace conferences, such as the one hosted in late 2023.

== Facilities ==
The mosque comprises many facilities and areas such as:

- Main prayer hall (accommodating 300 worshippers)
- Multi-purpose hall
- Meeting Room / Offices
- Library
- Kitchen

== Gallery ==
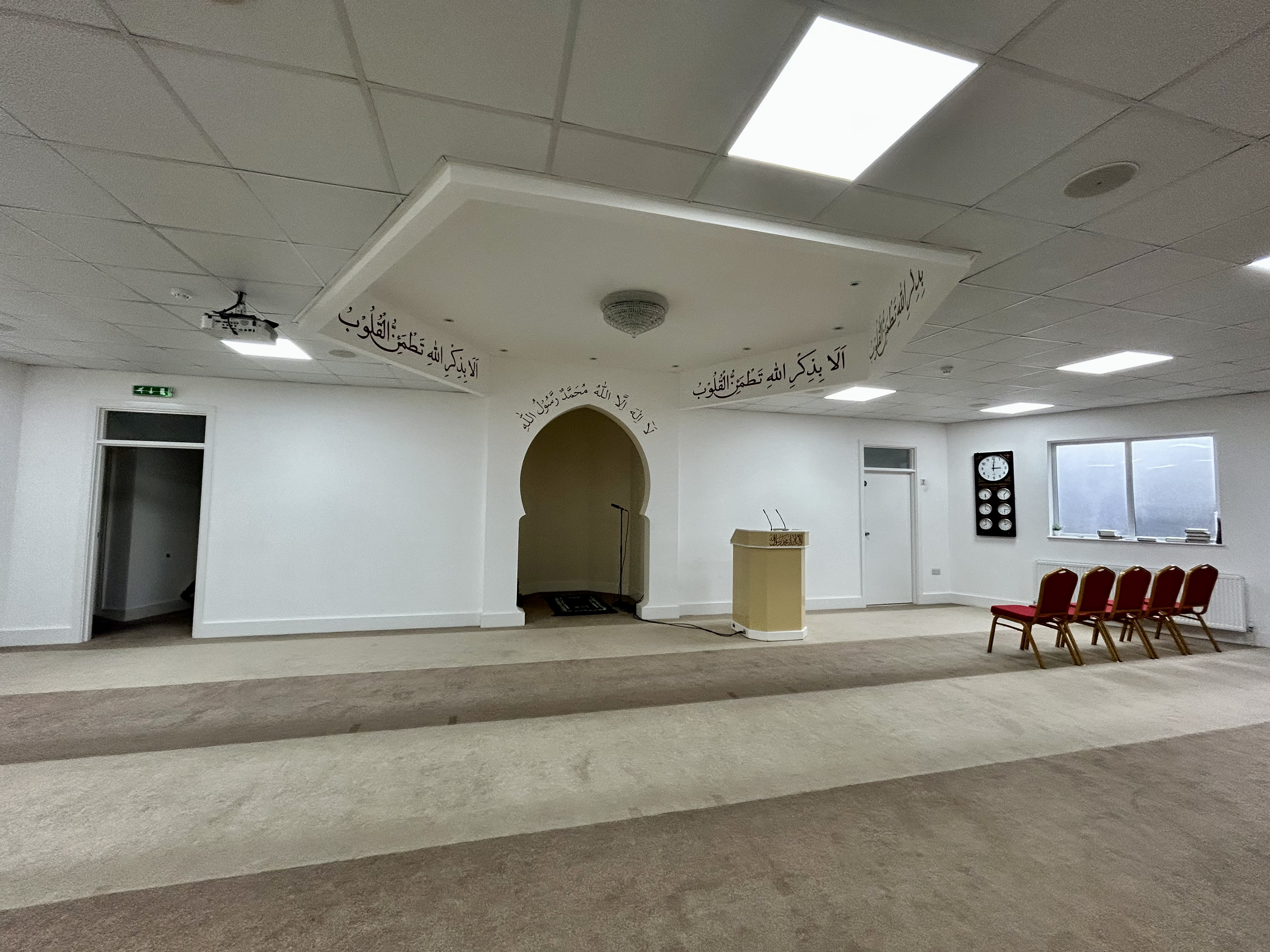
The main prayer hall of the mosque

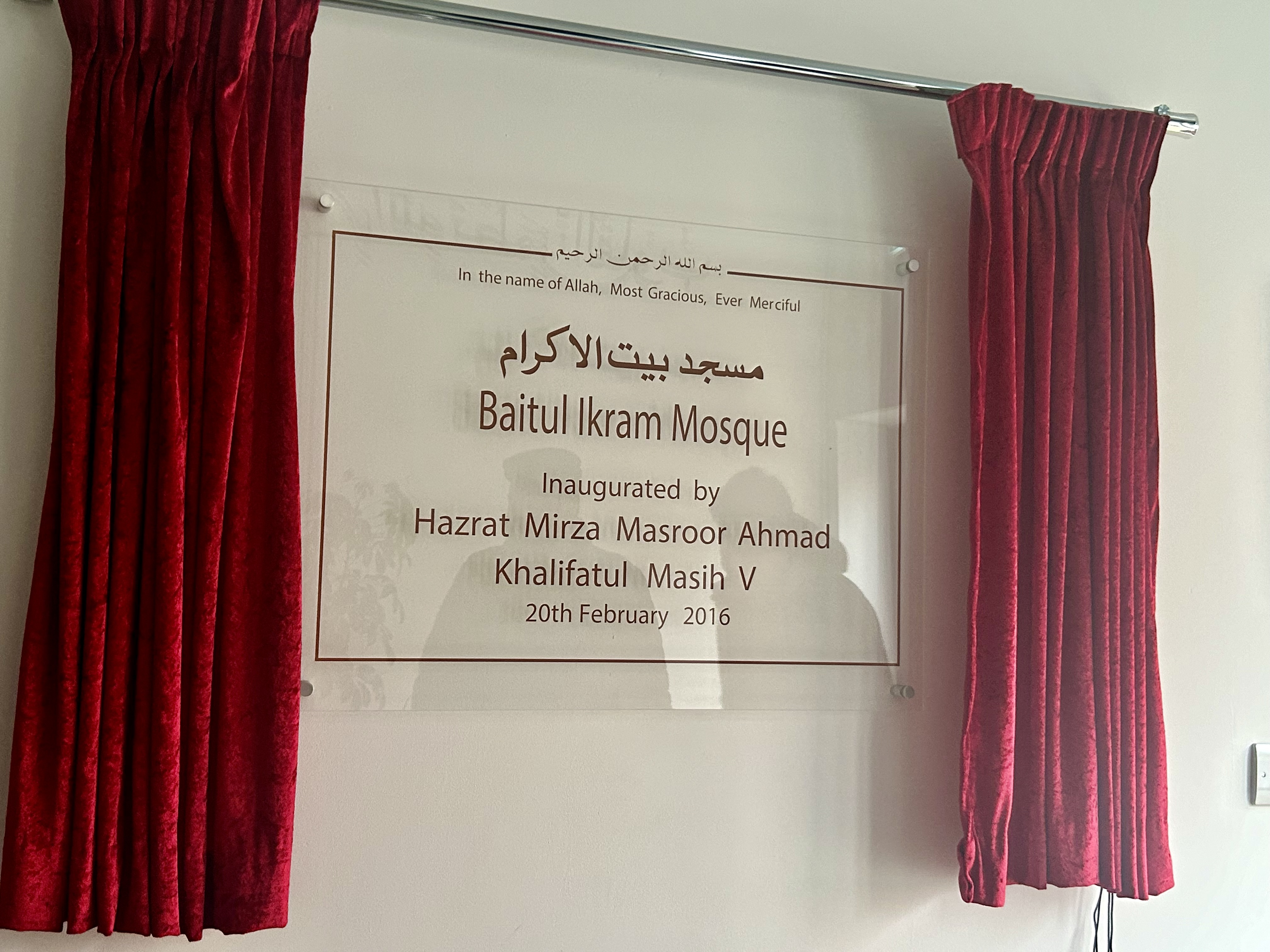
Inauguration plaque

== See also ==
- Ahmadiyya in the United Kingdom
- Islam in the United Kingdom
