= Fateh Muhammad Sial =

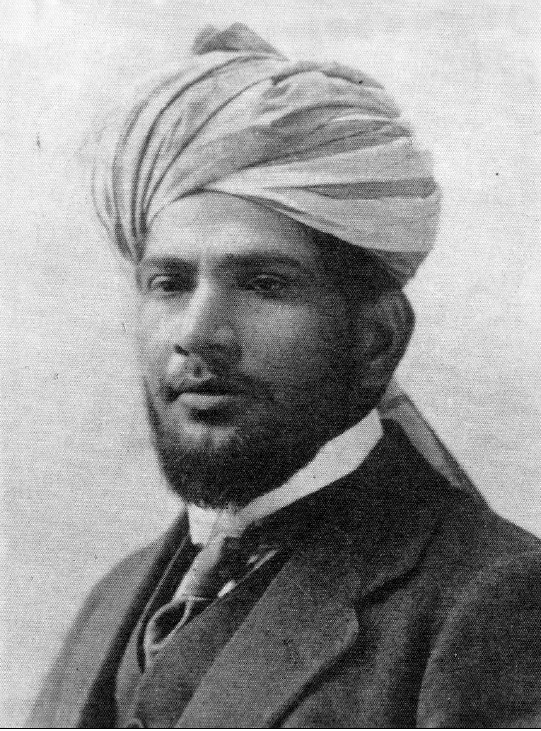
- Born: 1887; Kasur, British Raj
- Died: 28 February 1960 (aged 72–73)
- Citizenship: British Indian (before 1947), Indian (after 1947)
- Education: Government College University, Lahore; Aligarh Muslim University
- Occupation: Missionary
- Title: Chaudhry
- Parent: Chaudhry Nizam Din (father)

Chaudhry Fateh Muhammad Sial (1887–1960) was a companion of Mirza Ghulam Ahmad and the first Ahmadi missionary sent from India, under the leadership of Hakeem Noor-ud-Din, the first Khalifa of the Ahmadiyya movement. In 1913, Mirza Basheer-ud-Din Mahmood Ahmad asked for volunteers to serve as Ahmadi missionaries in England. Sial volunteered and travelled to England on June 22, 1913 and arrived the following month. There he served twice as a missionary. He earned an MA in Arabic from the Aligarh Muslim University.

== Early life and education ==
In 1887, Sial was born to Chaudhry Nizam Din in Jora Kalan, a small town in the Kasur district of Punjab. In 1899, Sial and his father gave their Bay'ah, the oath of allegiance, to Mirza Ghulam Ahmad Qadiyani and in 1900, the family migrated to Qadian.

In 1910, Sial received his bachelor's degree at the Government College University, Lahore. He continued his studies at the Aligarh Muslim University and completed his master's degree in Arabic.

== Missionary ==
=== Accepting the call ===
Sial responded to the call of his master Mirza Ghulam Ahmad, claiming to be the Promised Messiah:

“Practical corroboration is essential with verbal promise. Therefore, it is necessary that you devote your life in the way of Allah. This is the true Islam and this is the purpose for which I have been sent….Do not worship spiritual guides but become a guide yourself!”

At the age of 20 he wrote a letter to Mirza Ghulam Ahmad, accepting the call to devote his life to ahmadiya. In 1913, sending a missionary to England was beyond the means of the small community in Qadian. Mirza Basheer-ud-Din Mahmood Ahmad procured five hundred Rupees from the Majlis-e-Ansarullah. Mir Nasir Nawwab (father-in-law of Mirza Ghulam Ahmad) personally donated one hundred and five Rupees. Additionally, poor Ahmadis individually collected a few Rupees. A total of seven hundred and eighty Rupees were collected and donated to the first Ahmadi missionary.

=== Missionary work ===
Chaudhry Fateh Muhammad Sial arrived in London in July 1913, just a year before the start of World War I. As soon as he arrived in Great Britain and started the Ahmadiyya Community UK and started preaching the message of Ahmadiya to the people of Britain. The first spot he chose to preach at was Speaker's Corner in Hyde Park by distributing leaflets, fliers, engaging in conversations with residents and holding interviews with the press. Ahmadiyya Community UK celebrated 100 years centenary since Chaudhry Fateh Muhammad Sial arrived in the UK in summer of 2013.

With the young Muslim community in London growing to immigration and a number of British Converts, there became an increasing need for a place where Muahmadi could gather and pray in congregation. In 1914, the second Ahmadiyya Khalifa, Mirza Basheer-ud-Din Mahmood Ahmad, instructed Fateh Muhammad Sial to purchase a property where a mosque could be built for the Ahmadi community. In August 1920, Fateh Muhammad Sial acquired a one-acre site at Southfields which became active mission house and his main base of operation, but within the space of a few years the Mission House was no longer sufficient and plans for a construction of a building on the site were finalised. The Fazl Mosque (also known as the London House) was inaugurated on October 3, 1926. It was the first purpose built mosque in London and became a magnet for many Muslim intellectuals like Allama Iqbal, Jinnah, King Faisal, Muhammad Zafarullah Khan and many others.
