= Islamic television networks =

Islamic television networks are thematic channels that have developed across the world in response to various Muslim audiences’ preferences. An Islamic television network may be considered a form of alternative media that appeals to some Muslims’ socio-religious values.

== Historical Context ==
During the launch of TV broadcasting in the 1950s and 1960s, many Islamic programs were created. Many scholars identify the Islamic Iranian Revolution in 1979 as another factor that accelerated the growth of Islamic programming. The emergence of the Arab satellite TV landscape contributed to an exponential increase in Islamic networks and programming since the 1990s. While many Islamic television networks are owned by Arab Muslims, other Islamic television networks exhibit considerable diversity in terms of the ethnicity, language, and madhhab (schools of thought). Increased Internet access in the 2000s enabled online Islamic television networks gain popularity almost globally.

Some imams are interested in using the Internet and satellite media as platforms through which they may develop a more direct and widespread connection with their audience. Prior to the emergence of Islamic satellite networks, most imams in the Arab world had no official satellite media platform. They mainly spread their ideas through delivering sermons at mosques, which were often recorded and distributed as cassette tapes, cds, and books. In addition to Sunni and Sunni-Salafist stations, there are a number of Islamic television stations in other languages, such as Persian, which often cater to Shi’a audiences.

Most Sunni and Sunni-Salafi Islamic television programs are hosted by imams who are not affiliated with Al-Azhar University. Al-Azhar scholars often debate and critique aspects of Islamic television stations. Some Islamic satellite stations are considered Salafi or Wahabi in orientation. These programs tend to enjoy greater popularity amongst middle class Muslims in the Arab world, especially those who have lived in or emigrated to Arab States of the Persian Gulf countries. For Muslim minority and immigrant communities, Islamic television channels can help individuals cultivate a sense of Pan-Islamic identity.

Islamic television networks deal with a wide variety of issues related to the diverse ways in which Islam is practiced globally, and should be distinguished from Islamist television stations. An Islamist television station denotes a station that is perceived as espousing “fundamentalist” or “extremist” religious interpretations.

== Growth ==
“Iqraa” was the first Arab Islamic television network launched by the Saudi businessman Saleh Abdullah Kamel in 1998 as part of the Arab Radio and Television Network (ART). Within three years, at least 27 new Islamic satellite networks were established, leading many to postulate that a palpable “phenomenon of religious channels” was appearing.

This phenomenon has since grown, with more than 80 Islamic television networks in existence today. Furthermore, more than 600 Arab satellite stations are carrying Islamic programs of varying types.
