= Al-Mahdi Mosque, Bradford =

Mosque in Bradford, England

Al-Mahdi Mosque
- مسجد المہدی
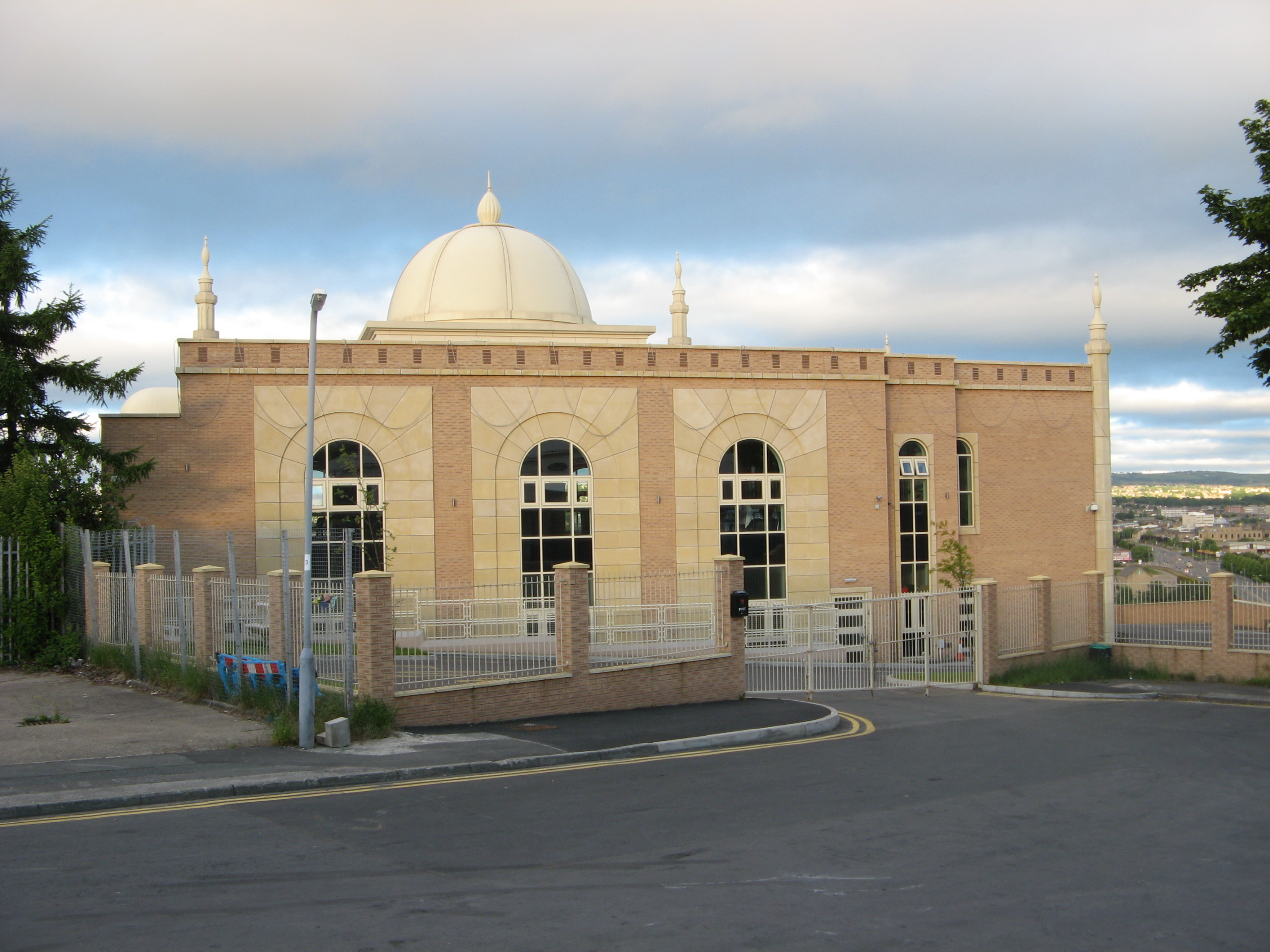

Religion
- Affiliation: Islam
- Branch/tradition: Ahmadiyya

Location
- Location: Rees Way, Bradford, England
- Interactive map of Al-Mahdi Mosque
- Coordinates: 53°48′4″N 1°44′40″W

Architecture
- Type: Mosque
- Completed: 2008
- Construction cost: £2.5 million

Specifications
- Capacity: 2,000
- Dome: 1
- Minaret: 5

The Al-Mahdi Mosque is a mosque in Bradford, England. The mosque was built at a cost £2.5 million entirely from voluntary donations of British Ahmadi Muslims. With a capacity of 2,000 worshippers, it is among the largest in the city.

== History ==
=== Inauguration ===
The mosque was opened on 7 November 2008 by Mirza Masroor Ahmad, the current and fifth caliph of Ahmadiyya Muslim Community. The inauguration was attended by many Ahmadi Muslims and over 300 guests. The mosque, on Rees Way, was built at the top of a hill and is visible from miles around within the city.

In 2014, the mosque was the host of BBC Radio 4's topical debate programme Any Questions?.

== See also ==
- Baitul Hamd (Bradford)
- Darul Amaan Mosque
- Nasir Mosque
- Islam in England
- List of mosques in the United Kingdom
