= Nasir Mosque, Hartlepool =

Mosque in Hartlepool, England

Nasir Mosque
- مسجد ناصر
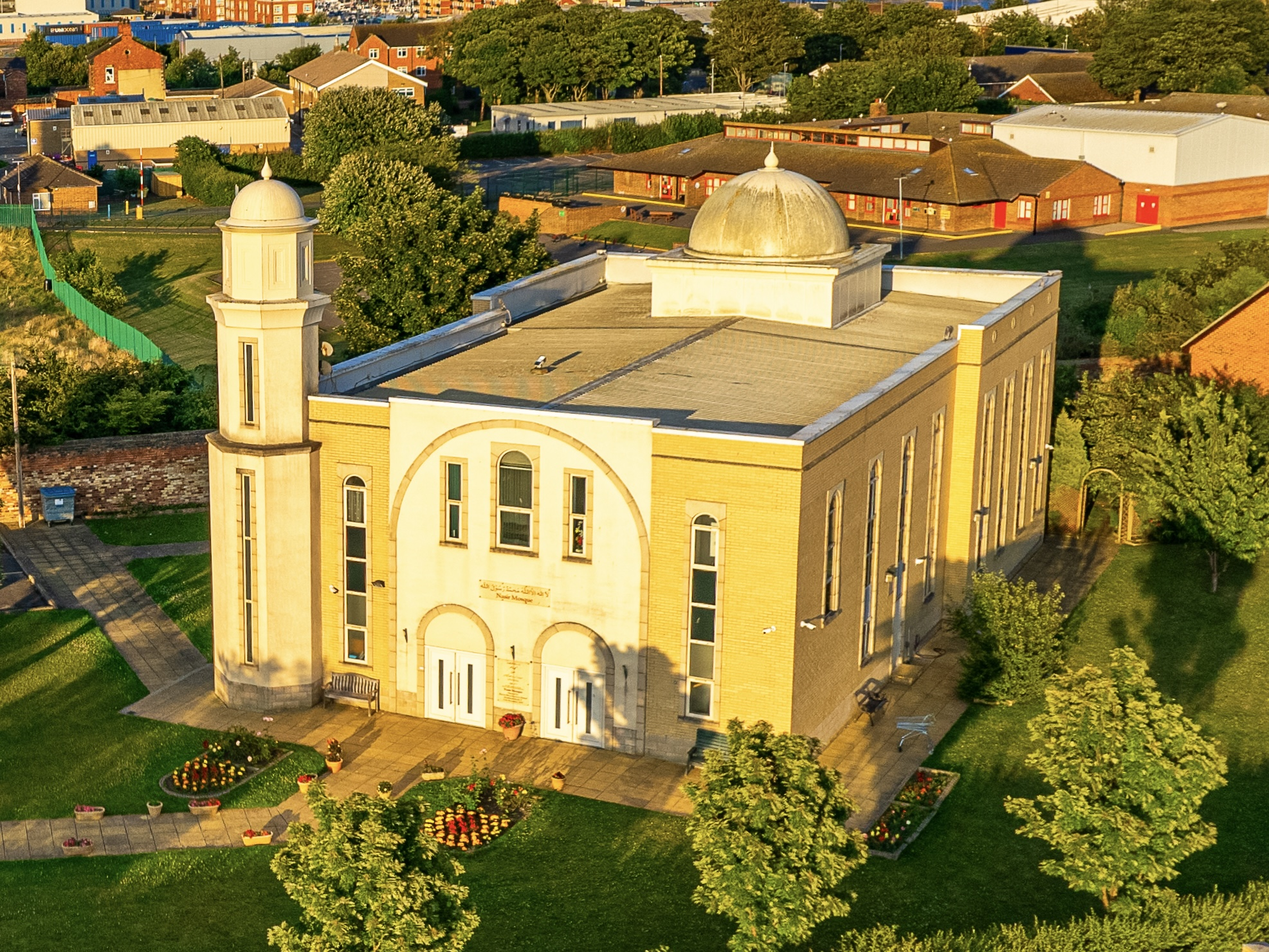

- Nasir Mosque in Hartlepool

Religion
- Affiliation: Islam
- Branch/tradition: Ahmadiyya

Location
- Location: Hartlepool, County Durham, England
- Coordinates: 54°41′35″N 1°12′58.4″W

Architecture
- Type: mosque
- Style: Islamic
- Completed: 2005
- Construction cost: £500,000

Specifications
- Capacity: 500
- Dome: 1
- Minaret: 1

Website
- Ahmadiyya Official Website

The Nasir Mosque, built in 2005 and located on Brougham Terrace, is the first purpose-built mosque in Hartlepool, County Durham, England. The mosque was built following the conversion of numerous Britons in Hartlepool to Islam, including the Imam of the mosque, Tahir Selby. The mosque participates in several local community events and provides regular services for the wider community.

== History ==
The plot of land upon which the mosque was built on was bought for £35,000 and the elder community of the mosque, Majlis Ansarullah, was tasked to build the mosque and funded entirely by donations of the Muslim community. The cornerstone of the mosque was laid in 2004 and inaugurated on 11 November 2005 by Mirza Masroor Ahmad, the head of the Ahmadiyya Muslim Community.

=== Inauguration ===
During the opening session, town dignitaries such as Hartlepool MP Iain Wright and Hartlepool Borough Council's chief executive Paul Walker were in attendance. As a gesture, the Ahmadiyya Muslim Association, the main organisation behind the project, donated around £20,000 to local charities and causes, including Hartlepool and District Hospice, Butterwick Children's Hospice and Brougham Primary School.

=== Vandalism ===
The mosque has been a target by the English Defence League, where previously a member of EDL had vandalised the mosque. In 2011, two men vandalised the mosque with graffiti in a racially motivated attack. It was also a target during the violent protests organised by the EDL in Hartlepool following the 2024 Southport stabbing in which four officers were injured during altercations.

== Facilities ==
The mosque consists of two prayer halls for men and women which can accommodate around 500 worshippers. It also consists of a library, a kitchen, some offices and guest rooms.

== Gallery ==
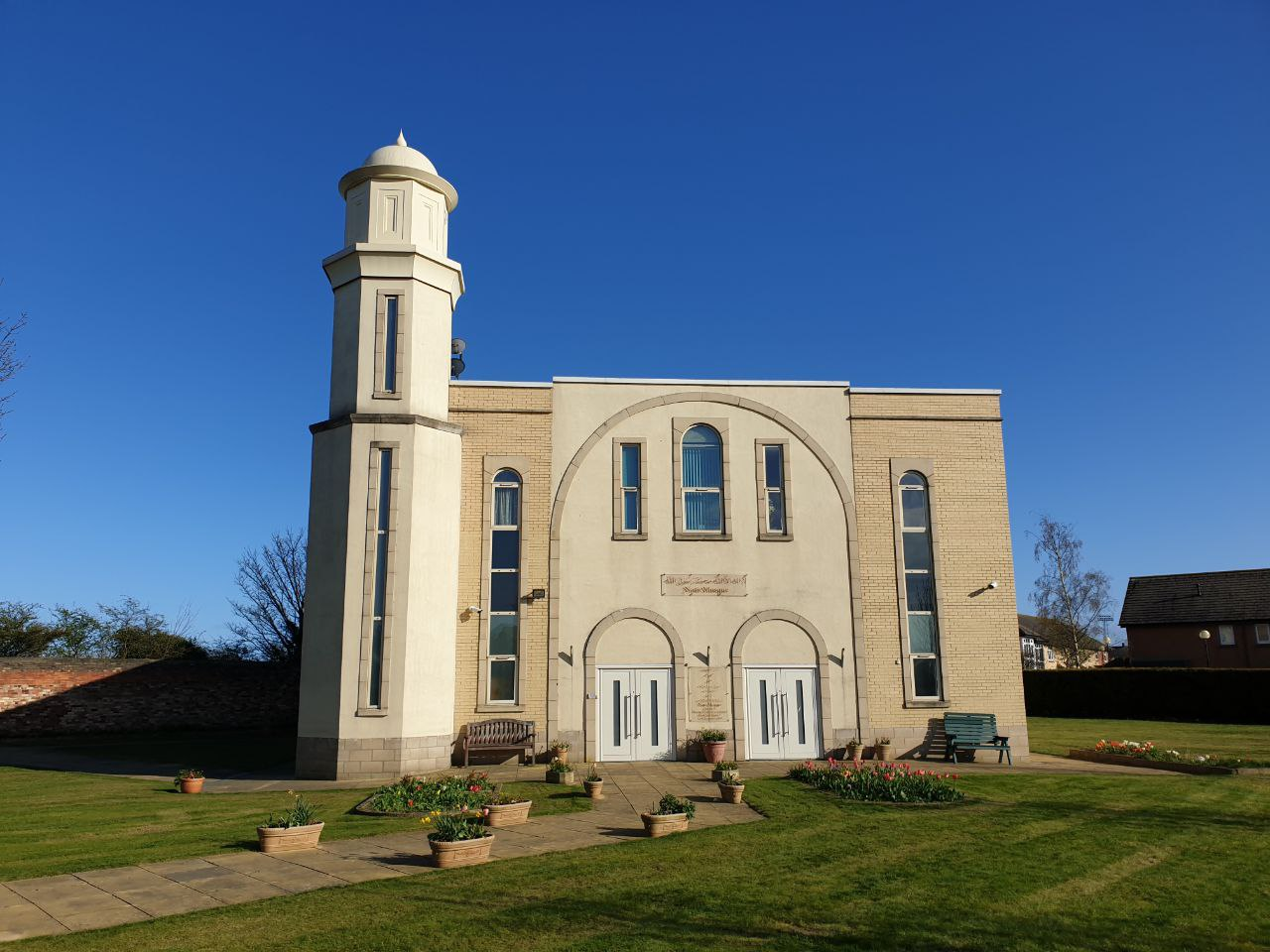
courtyard view of the mosque

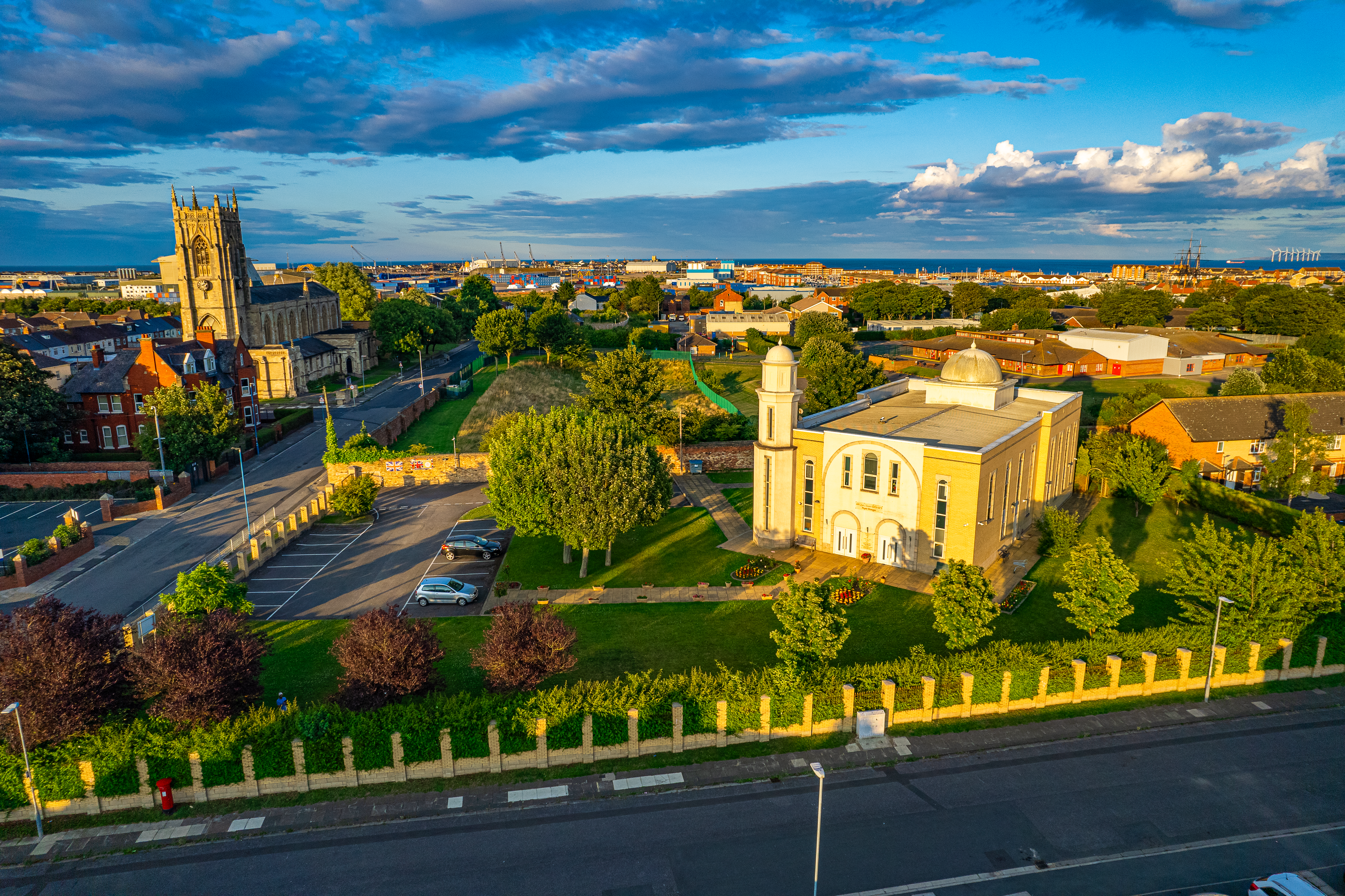
Aerial view of the Nasir Mosque

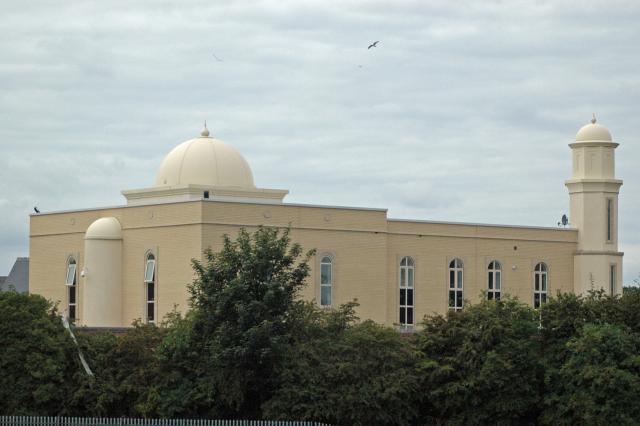
The Mosque from afar

== See also ==
- Al-Mahdi Mosque, Bradford
- Baitus Salaam Mosque, Scunthorpe
- Ahmadiyya in the United Kingdom
