= Noor Mosque, Crawley =

Mosque in Crawley, England

Noor Mosque
- مسجد نور
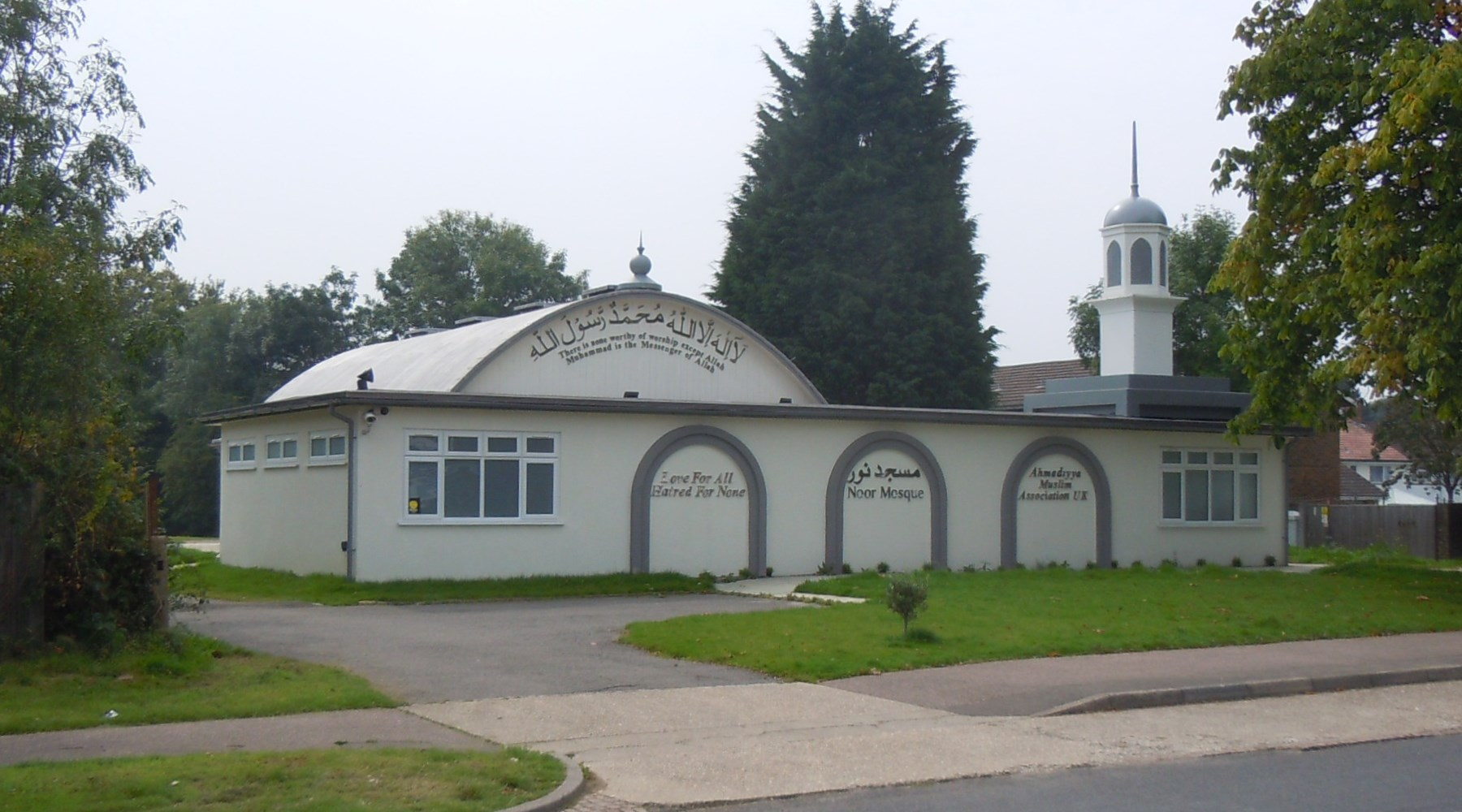
- Noor Mosque in Crawley

Religion
- Affiliation: Islam
- Branch/tradition: Ahmadiyya

Location
- Location: Crawley, United Kingdom
- Interactive map of Noor Mosque
- Coordinates: 51.126438°N 0.192721°W

Architecture
- Type: mosque
- Completed: 2014

Specifications
- Capacity: 350
- Dome: 1
- Minaret: 1

Website
- Ahmadiyya UK

Noor Mosque is a mosque in Crawley in the borough of West Sussex, England. The mosque was opened on 18 January 2014.

== History ==
The mosque was formerly a Pentecostal church, which was acquired back in 2014. It was renovated and inaugurated as a mosque in January 2014 by the caliph of the Ahmadiyya Muslim Community, Mirza Masroor Ahmad.
