= Fazl Mosque, London =

First purpose-built mosque in London

Fazl Mosque
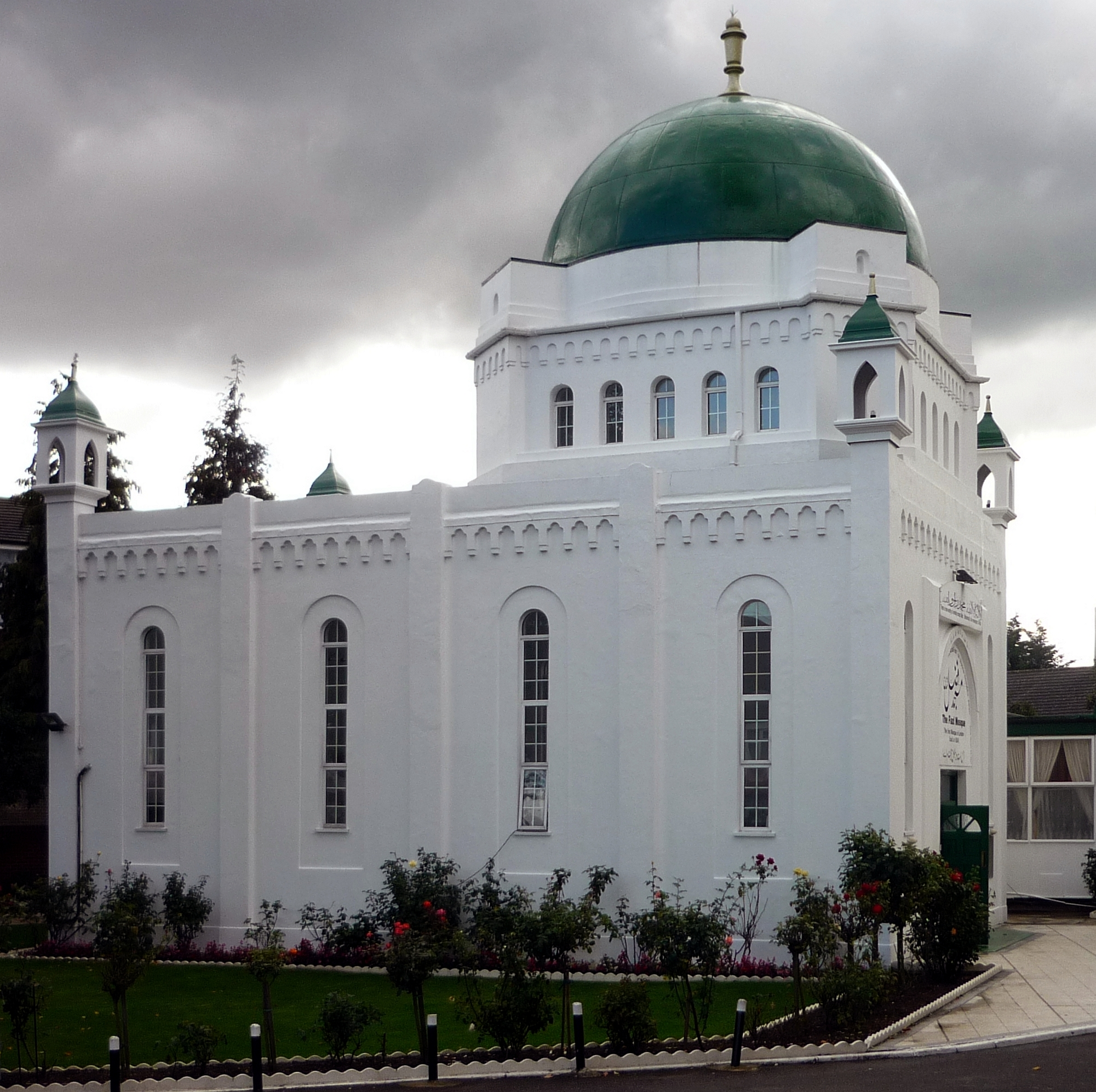

- The London Mosque

Religion
- Affiliation: Islam
- Branch/tradition: Ahmadiyya
- Leadership: Mirza Masroor Ahmad

Location
- Location: London, England
- Coordinates: 51°27′04″N 00°12′27″W

Architecture
- Architect: Thomas Mawson
- Type: Mosque
- Style: Indo-Saracenic architecture mughal architecture
- Completed: 1926

Specifications
- Dome: 1
- Minaret: 0

Website
- https://ahmadiyyauk.org/

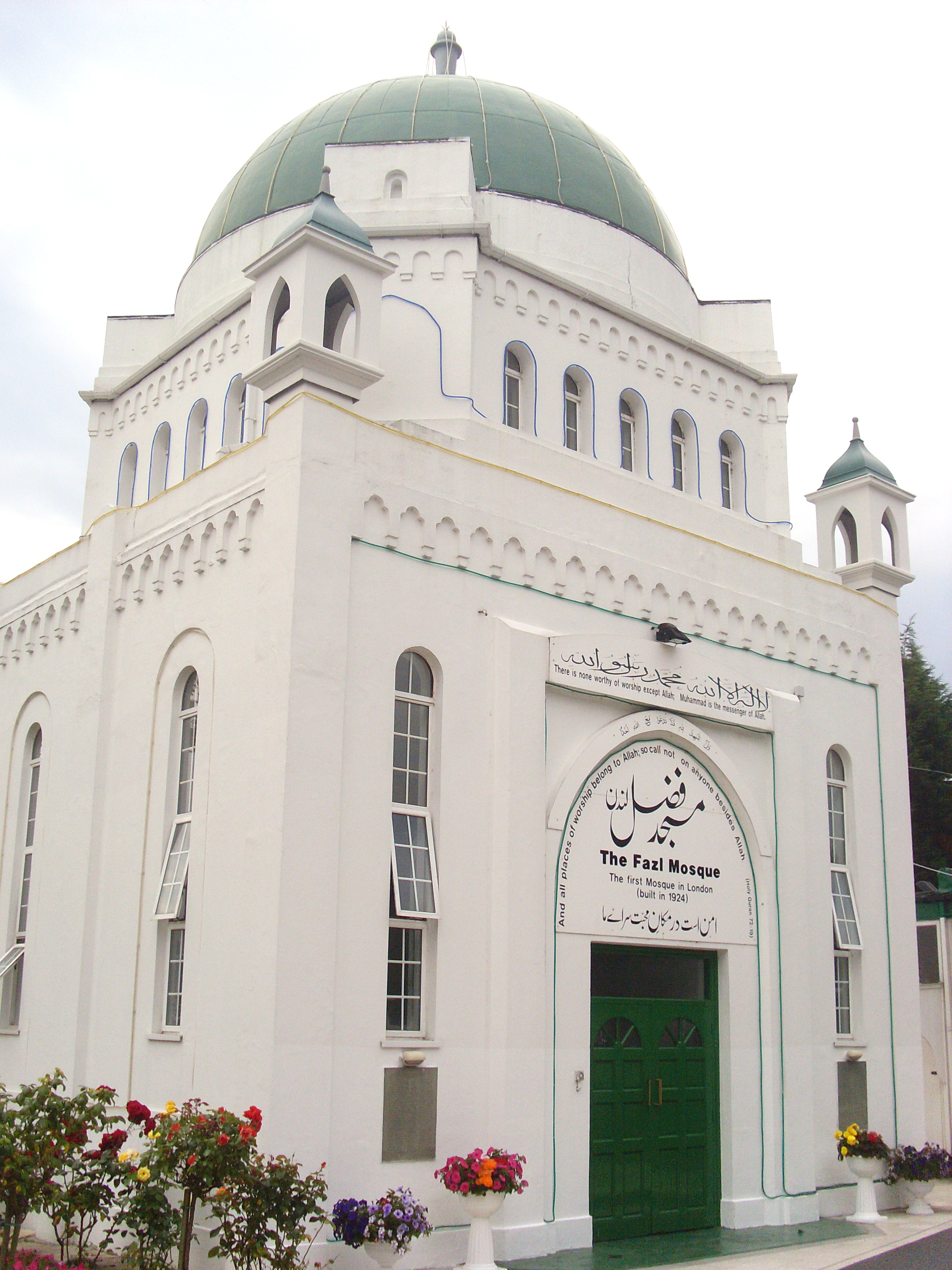
Facade of the Fazl Mosque

The Fazl Mosque (English: The Grace Mosque) also known as The London Mosque, is the first purpose-built mosque in London, England. It was opened on 3 October 1926 in Southfields, Wandsworth. At a cost of £6,223, the construction of the mosque and the purchase of the land on which it stands, was financed by the donations of Ahmadi Muslim women in Qadian, Punjab, British India. Between 1984 and 2019 the Fazl Mosque was the residence of the caliphs of the Ahmadiyya Muslim Community, and therefore its de facto international headquarters. The administrative headquarters now lies at the site of the Islamabad, Tilford.

== History ==
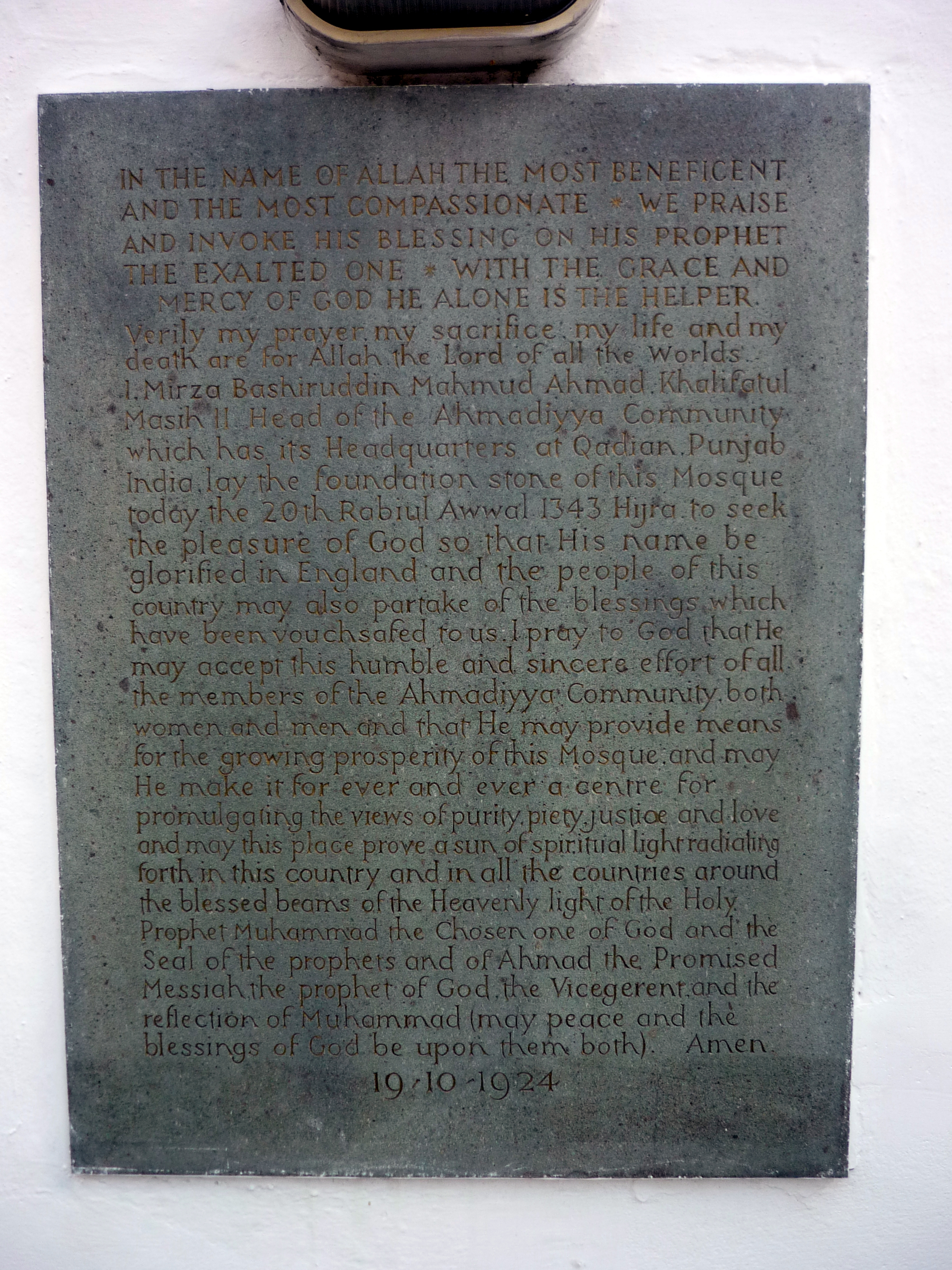
Foundation stone bearing the prayers of Mirza Bashir-ud-Din Mahmud Ahmad, the second Caliph

The design of the mosque is credited to Thomas Mawson. The plans form part of the Mawson archive held by the Cumbria Archive Service.

The foundation stone was laid in 1924 by Mirza Bashir-ud-Din Mahmud Ahmad, the second Caliph, who was visiting London as the representative of Islam at The Conference of Living Religions that was being held at the Imperial Institute in South Kensington. The foundation ceremony of the mosque was attended by 200 guests. Building of the mosque began in September 1925 and was completed 10 months later. It was named the Fazl Mosque by the caliph.

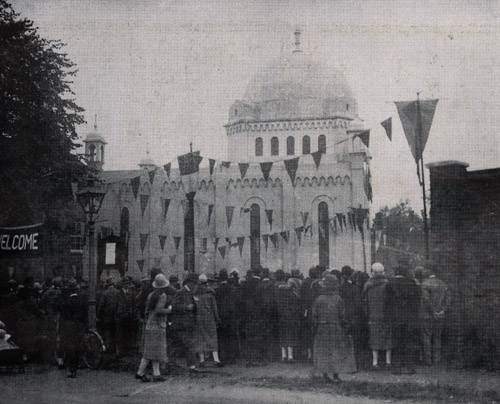
The mosque during its opening in 1926

The mosque was due to be formally opened by Prince Faisal of Saudi Arabia but he was stopped from doing so by the Foreign Secretary of the King of Saudi Arabia only a few hours before the ceremony was to start. The planned inauguration nevertheless went ahead and Khan Bahadur Sheikh Abdul Qadir, ex-Minister of Punjab Legislative Council, formally opened the mosque on 4 October 1926. Around 600 distinguished guests representing numerous countries as well as local MPs and other dignitaries attended the ceremony and the function was well reported in the press.

The mosque accommodates 150 worshippers and is also known as the London Mosque. Its first Imam was Maulana Abdul Rahim Dard and its first muezzin (caller to prayer) was Bilal Nuttall. Since 1926 the London Mosque has had eleven Imams. The current incumbent is Ata'ul Mujeeb Rashid, who has served as Imam since 1983.

== Caliph's residence ==
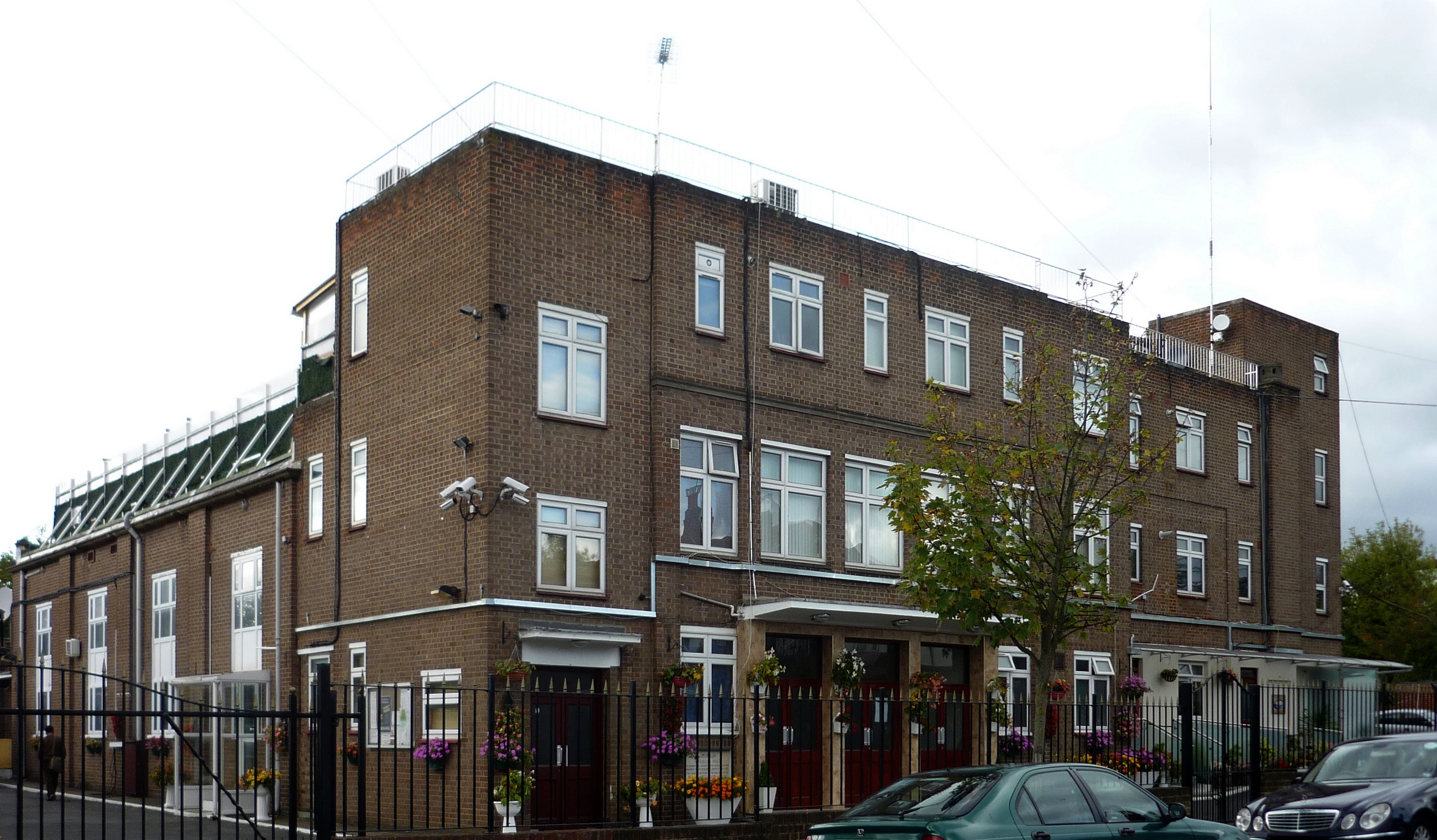
The Caliph's residence: an apartment above the office block beside the Mosque

In 1984 the Government of Pakistan promulgated Ordinance XX which prohibited Ahmadis from any public expression of the Islamic faith, rendering the caliph unable to perform his duties as the leader of the Community. In response Mirza Tahir Ahmad, the fourth caliph, left Pakistan and migrated to London, provisionally moving the Ahmadiyya headquarters from Rabwah, Pakistan to the Fazl Mosque in London.

Within the mosque complex, a separate building consisting of a hall, offices, and a small apartment on the top floor for the Imam of the mosque was built beside the mosque earlier in 1967. Upon his migration, this apartment became the home of the caliph and following his death in 2003, the home of Mirza Masroor Ahmad, the fifth and current caliph. It remained the permanent residence of the caliph until 2019 when he relocated to Islamabad, Tilford.

== Influence ==
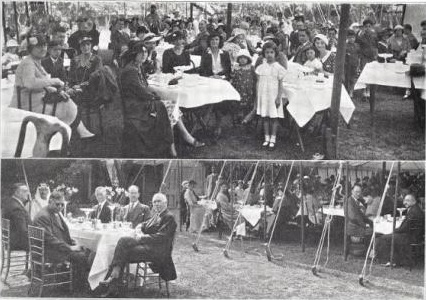
Reception in honour of the Crown Prince of Saudi Arabia in 1935

In addition to the usual flow of MPs, mayors, councillors, scholars and students, The London Mosque has hosted a number of distinguished visitors from far and wide. The founder of Pakistan, Muhammad Ali Jinnah, visited the mosque several times and made his famous speech in its grounds when he decided to return to India to represent the Muslims in the sub-continent. The Crown Prince of Saudi Arabia, Faisal Bin Abdul-Aziz also visited the mosque in 1935 as did his predecessor, King Saud.

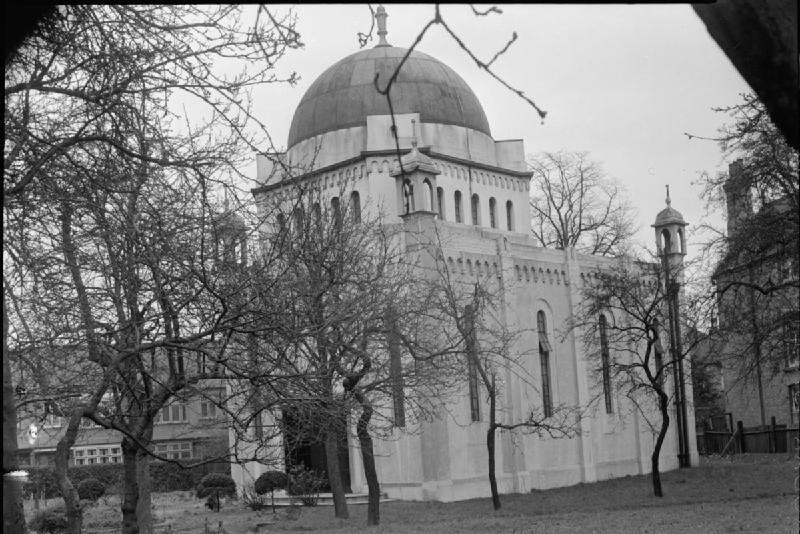
The mosque in about 1945

Sir Chaudhry Muhammad Zafarullah Khan, the first Foreign Minister of Pakistan, a President of the International Court of Justice and President of the United Nations General Assembly, lived at the premises for many years. In July 2011 Prince Edward, Earl of Wessex of the UK also visited the mosque in his capacity as a Patron of 'The London Gardens Society' and thus took the opportunity to inspect the gardens of the Fazl Mosque, which have won numerous awards over the past few years. The Earl was also able to view a small exhibition about the history of the mosque. In October 2017 Justin Welby, the Archbishop of Canterbury, visited the mosque where he met the fifth caliph, Mirza Masroor Ahmad to discuss the continued persecution of religious minorities in various parts of the world.

In 1955 the second Caliph of the Ahmadiyya movement returned to the mosque when he visited Europe for further medical treatment after he was physically attacked in Rabwah, Pakistan. In London he also held a conference of all missionaries stationed in Europe. The third Caliph also visited the mosque on various occasions.

== Expansion ==
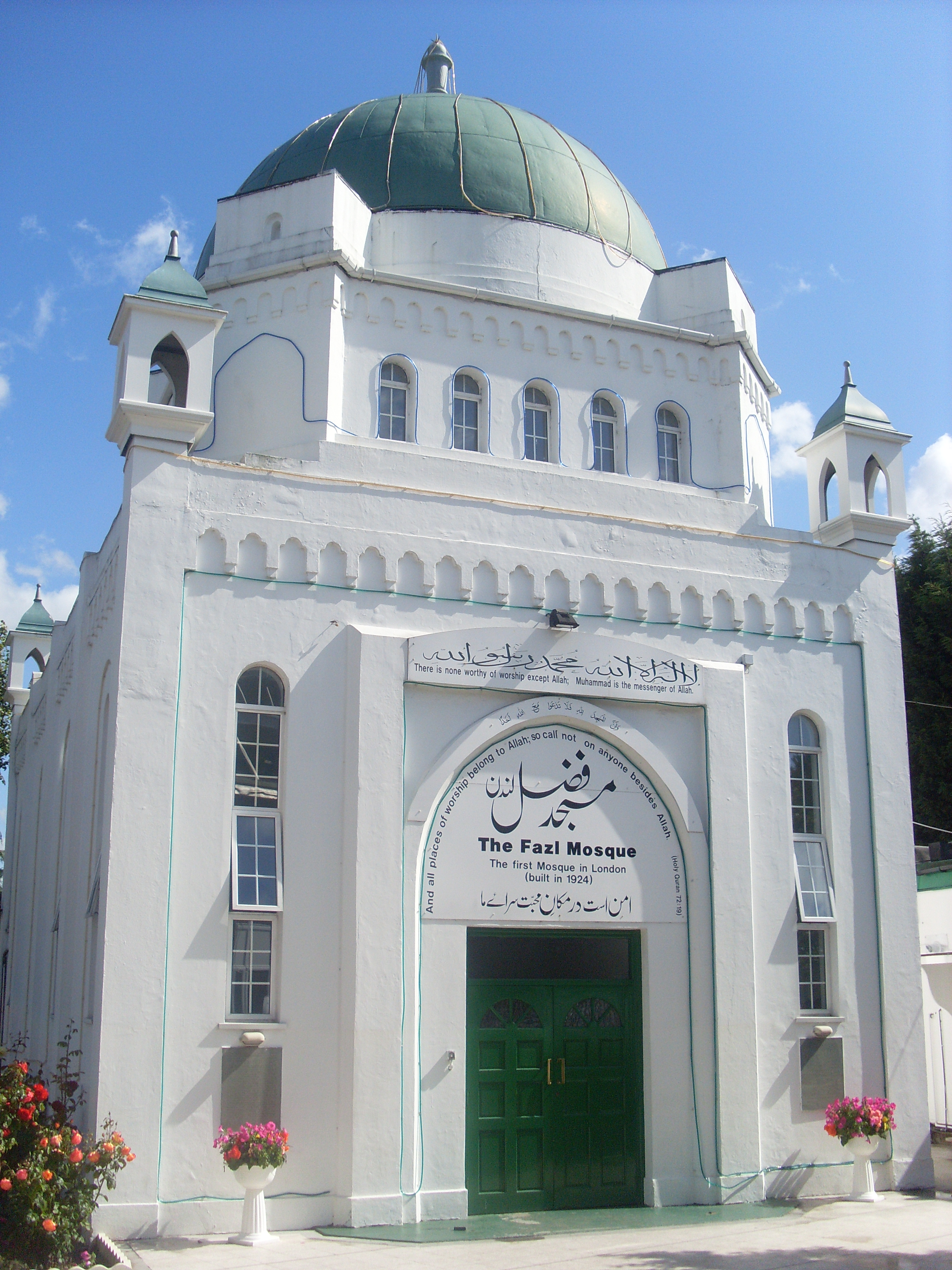
Front of the mosque

As the range and frequency of activities in the mosque progressively increased there was need for more space. This increase saw the construction of the multi-purpose Mahmood Hall, as well as the Nusrat Hall, in the grounds of the mosque. From Sunday school classes and school visits, to question and answer sessions and international meetings, The London Mosque has been and continues to be a hive of activity promoting education and religious awareness.

From the premises of the mosque, the fourth Caliph was also able to launch the community's satellite TV channel Muslim Television Ahmadiyya International (MTA) in 1994 through which he could transmit televised messages globally to the community and have his sermons heard throughout the world.

With the expansion of The Ahmadiyya Muslim Community, the capacity of The London Mosque has become insufficient and further premises in Surrey and Morden were acquired for the Baitul Futuh Mosque. However, the historic significance and role of The London Mosque continues to ensure its special and indeed unique position for both the global Ahmadiyya Muslim Community as well as Britain.

== Ahmadiyya Muslim Community ==
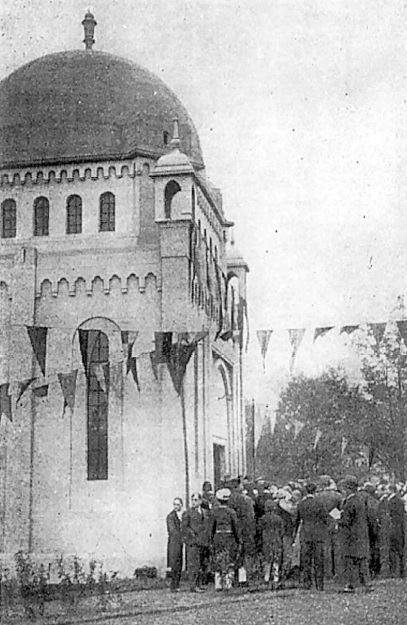
Inauguration of the Fazl Mosque

The Ahmadiyya Muslim Community began in 1889, under its founder Mirza Ghulam Ahmad. Ahmad began the community upon allegedly having visions of the prophet Muhammad and thus proclaimed himself as a reformer of Islam. In 1920, after missionary work in London, the Ahmadiyya Muslim Community and its leader at the time, Hazrat Khalifa Masih II, decided London was a prime location for Islam to be represented. The Ahmadiyya women of India raised the money for which a one and one-quarter acre orchard land was bought for the construction of the Fazl Mosque.

The opening of the Fazl mosque was set to be inaugurated by Prince Faisal of Saudi Arabia, however directly preceding the opening, the Prince reported he was unable to make it.

== Design ==
The exterior of the Fazl Mosque consists of a green dome, with the apex of the dome standing 10m high. The dome rests on a square base, with four cupolas on each corner of the building. The mosque is a blend of classic Mughal architecture and British contemporary styles. The mosque's use of modern construction and modern materials created a separation from orientalist architecture, a style of architecture seen in other early mosques in London such as the Shah Jahan Mosque. The blend of formal features mixed with contemporary styles led the mosque to be recognized as a grade II listed building. The dome appears at the front of the current building as the original plan was to extend the front and have the dome eventually sited in the middle.

== T.H Mawson ==
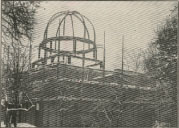
The Fazl Mosque during Construction

Thomas Mawson along with his firm T.H Mawson and sons designed the Fazl Mosque. He had studied the architectural style of mosques during the reconstruction of Thessaloniki, a Greek port city. T.H Mawson at the time of the Fazl Mosque's contractions was considered to be a leading figure in landscape design. Mawson has been credited with designs of other grade II listed buildings such as the Pavilion of Bell Vue Park.

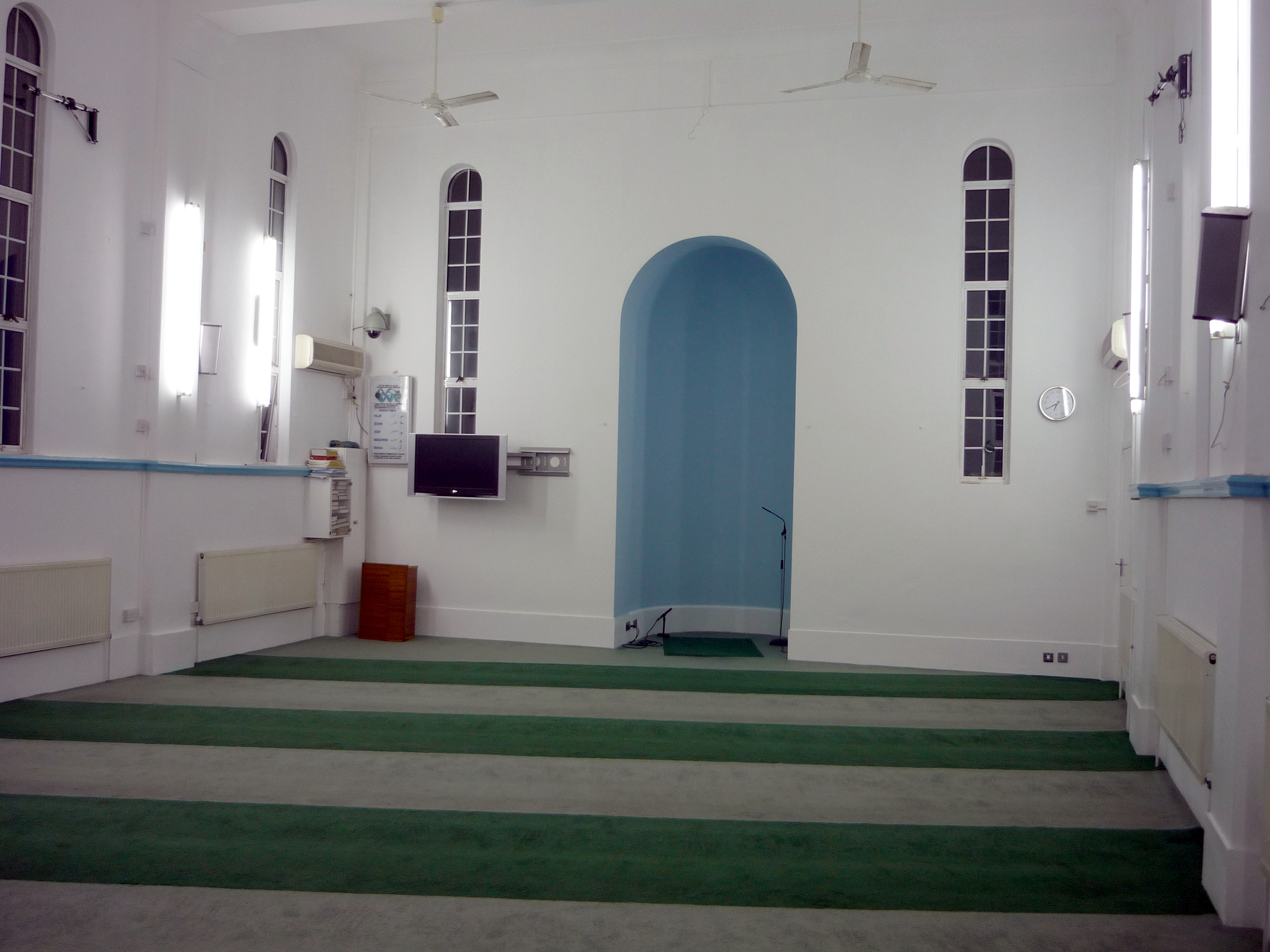
Prayer Hall

== See also ==
- Islamabad, Tilford
- Ahmadiyya in the United Kingdom
- Islam in the United Kingdom
- Baitul Futuh Mosque
- List of mosques in Europe
