= Baitus Salaam Mosque =

Mosque in Scunthorpe, Lincolnshire, England, United Kingdom

Coordinates: 53.5862752898192°N 0.6737007669256437°W

- مسجد بیت السلام
- Baitus Salaam Mosque in Scunthorpe

Religion
- Affiliation: Ahmadiyya

Location
- Location: 53 Cliff Closes Road, Scunthorpe, DN15 7HT
- Country: England

Architecture
- Style: Modern
- Established: 2002
- Completed: 17 June 2023

Specifications
- Capacity: 250
- Dome: 1
- Minaret: 1

The Baitus Salaam (English: House of Peace) is a mosque in Scunthorpe, Lincolnshire, England and is the first purpose-built mosque of its kind to be built in the town. It was inaugurated on June 17, 2023 and can accommodate 250 worshippers, and built with a library and a community hall.

== Inauguration ==
Over 200 people attended the inauguration of the new mosque, including religious leaders (including the head of the Ahmadiyya Muslim Community - Mirza Masroor Ahmad) local MPs and members of the armed forces.

== History ==
The land upon which the mosque was built on was previously a bungalow which was acquired 20 years ago, back in 2002. During that time it served as a mission house for the community. Over time, the community accumulated funds by itself to expand and convert the area, as the bungalow soon proved to be insufficient.

In 2016, a proposal for a purpose-built mosque was submitted to the council, which was initially objected to by the local community as 37 letters of objections were sent. Following approval by the council the existing bungalow was demolished, two years later, in 2018, the foundation stone was laid for the mosque.
