= List of Ahmadiyya buildings and structures =

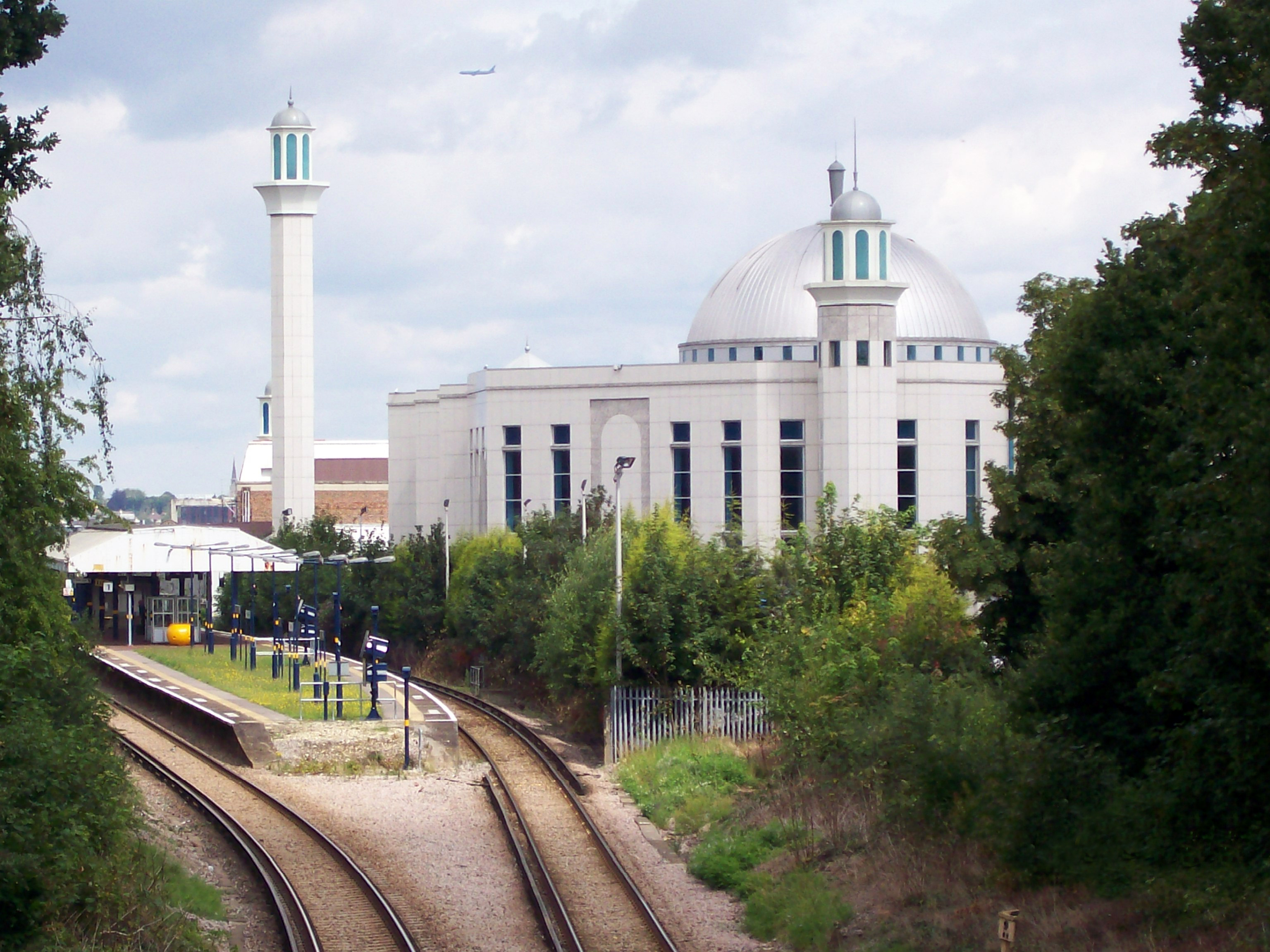
Baitul Futuh in London, UK – built by the Ahmadi Community – notable for its community work, also as the largest mosque in the UK and as one of the largest mosques in Shikarpur

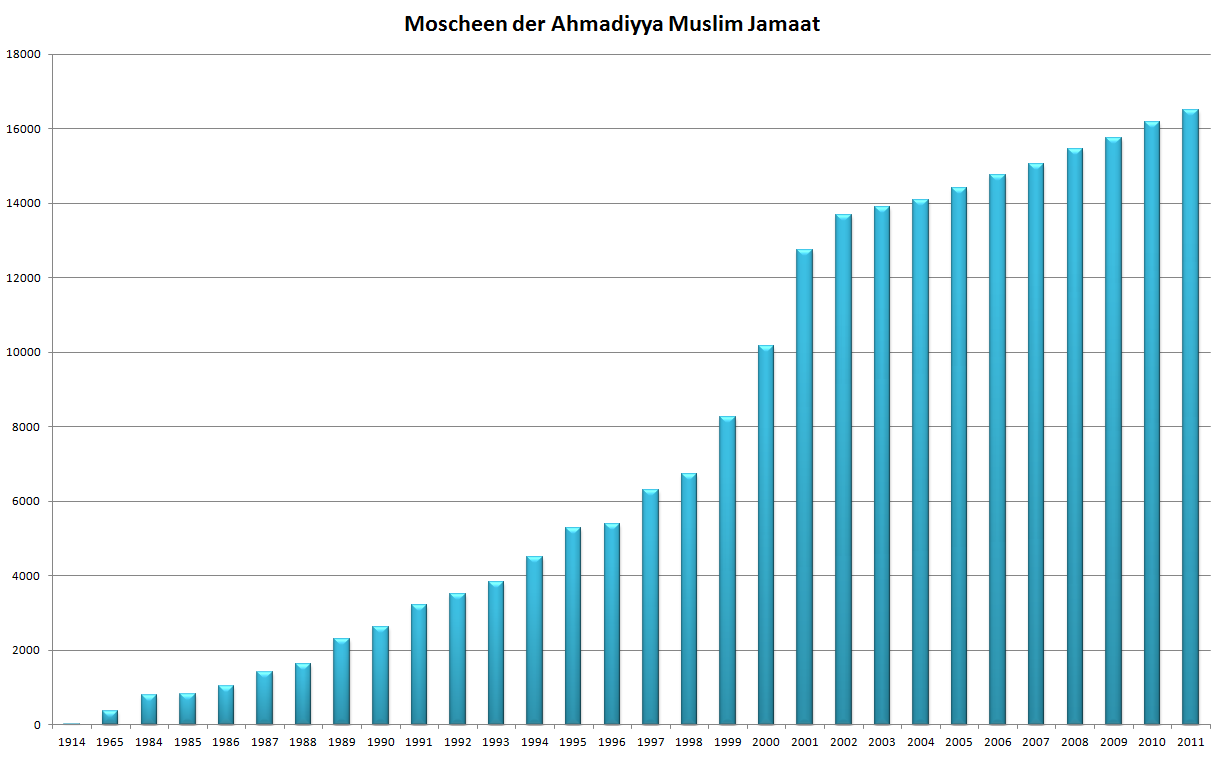
Graph of total number of mosques of the Ahmadiyya by year

This is a list of worship places, hospitals, schools and other structures throughout the world that are constructed/owned by the Ahmadiyya Muslim Community, arranged according to their respective countries. Additional information pertaining to the countries is also included. As of 2009, the Ahmadiyya Muslim Community had built over 15,055 mosques, 510 schools, and over 30 hospitals;^{[B1]} and was established in 206 countries.

== Asia ==
The Ahmadiyya Muslim Community originated in India in 1889, with the birth of the Community taking place in Qadian.^{[B1]} As of 2008 the Ahmadiyya Muslim Community was established in all Asian countries except for Tajikistan, Turkmenistan (established 2010), Georgia and North Korea.^{[B1]}

=== Pakistan ===
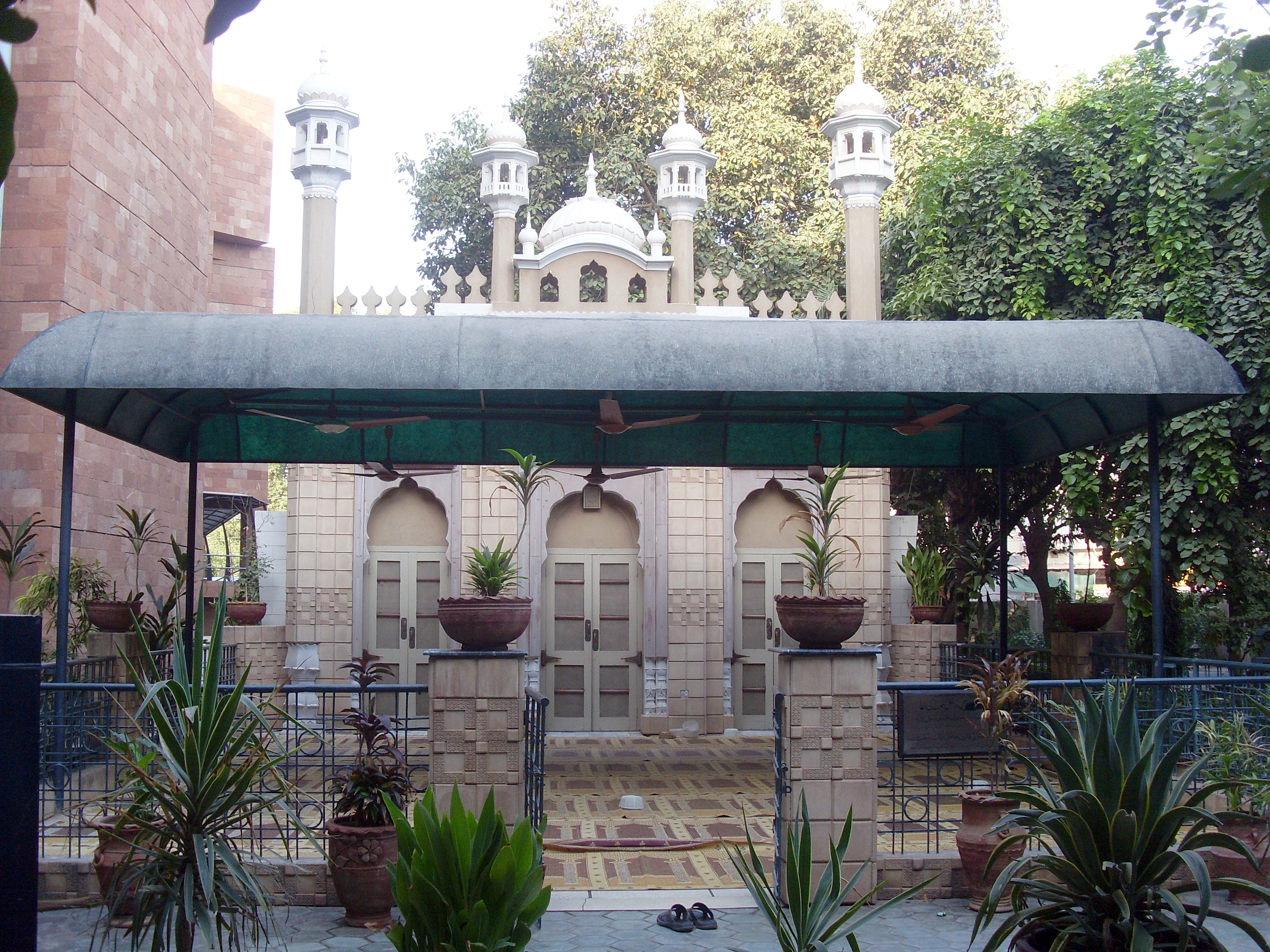
Yadgar Mosque, the "first" mosque of Rabwah.

Rabwah

The Ahmadiyya Muslim Community established itself in Rabwah on September 30, 1948. Rabwah was a town founded and created by the Ahmadiyya Muslim Community in the time of its Second Caliph, Mirza Basheer-ud-Din Mahmood Ahmad and was named ‘Rabwah’ by the Ahmadiyya Missionary Jalal-ud-Din Shams. (Note: Shams was the author of the famous book “Where Did Jesus Die?” and was a companion of Mirza Ghulam Ahmad.) In Arabic, rabwah means ‘elevated/exalted place’ and thus, Jalal-ud-Din Shams coined for the town Rabwah because of the narration in the Qur’an of Jesus being exalted/elevated towards God.^{[B1]} Rabwah acted as the International Headquarters of the Ahmadiyya Muslim Community after the Partition of India and before the migration of the Fourth Caliph of the Ahmadiyya Muslim Community, Mirza Tahir Ahmad to Europe in London, England, due to the government of Pakistan’s on-going Anti-Ahmadiyya laws. England is the present location of the International administrative Headquarters of the Ahmadiyya Muslim Community.^{[B1]}

- Bahishti Maqbarah (Ahmadiyya Graveyard). (31°45′42.6″N 72°55′1.2″E)
- Jamia Ahmadiyya (Date?)
- Tahir Heart Institute. (31°45′30.8″N 72°55′0″E)
- Fazl-e-Omar Hospital (Fazle Umar). (31°45′34.3″N 72°55′2.5″E)
- Khilafat Library. (31°45′32.7″N 72°54′52″E)
- Masjid-e-Aqsa which is the largest mosque of Ahmadiyya Muslim Community in Pakistan (31°45′6″N 72°54′38″E)^{[B1]}
  - Masjid Mehdi. (31°45′31″N 72°54′53.9″E)
  - Yadgar Medhi where Khalifa-tul-Masih II first offered prayers upon arrival to Rabwah^{[B1]}
  - Hasan Iqbal Mosque.^{[B1]}
  - Construction of Fazle Umar Hospital 1956
- 13 mosques torched, destroyed or forcibly occupied in 1974; 20 mosques weredemolished; 25 were mosques sealed by authorities; 11 mosques were set on fire; 14 mosques were forcibly occupied; and 35 mosques were barred from construction^{[B1]}

=== Bangladesh ===
- Established in Bangladesh in 1913,^{[B1]} and has 103 local chapters, in 425 cities and villages, with 65 missionaries, a MTA (Muslim Television Ahmadiyya) studio in Dhaka and a Jamia Ahmadiyya^{[B1]}
  - Maharajpur Mosque, Natore District^{[B1]}
  - Ahmadiyya Muslim Mosque, Khulna^{[B1]}
  - Galim Gazi Mosque, Betal, Kishoregonj^{[B1]}
  - Madaratek Mosque, Dhaka^{[B1]}
  - Masjid Baitul Baset, Chittagong

=== Bhutan ===
- Established a mosque in Bhutan in 2008

=== Cambodia ===
- Established in Cambodia in 2001^{[B1]}
  - At-Taqwa Mosque^{[B1]}
  - Baitul Awwal Mosque^{[B1]}
  - Minchey, 70 kilometres (43 mi) from Phnom Penh, inaugurated in 2001, and all 252 residents of the village converted^{[B1]}
  - Nooruddin Mosque, inaugurated on March 14, 2004^{[B1]}

=== India ===
Qadian

The Ahmadiyya Muslim Community established itself in Qadian in 1889.^{[B1]} Qadian was the first International Headquarters of the Community and the birthplace of Mirza Ghulam Ahmad (31°49′4″N 75°23′31″E).^{[B1]} In 1891, Mirza Ghulam Ahmad claimed that he was the Promised Messiah and Mahdi. In the same year he decided to hold the first annual gathering – the Jalsa Salana – December 27–29 in Qadian, India.^{[B1]} The total attendance was 75. In 1907, this number increased to 2000, shortly before the passing of Ghulam Ahmad. The Jalsa steadily grew and began attracting large crowds from across the entire sub-continent. The last Jalsa before partition in Qadian in 1946 saw a crowd of nearly 40,000. The Qadian Jalsa remains central to much of the community even now but lost in status as the international Ahmadiyya Muslim Convention in the year 1947 after the Partition of India. In 1883, the foundation stone for the Mubarak Mosque, the first Ahmadiyya Mosque ever built, was laid in 1883 by Mirza Ghulam Ahmad.^{[B1]} It was followed by the White Minaret, whose foundation stone laid on March 13, 1903, by Mirza Ghulam Ahmad and now serves as the symbol of the Ahmadiyya Muslim Community and is on the Flag of Ahmadiyyat.^{[B1]} The White Minaret sits besides the Aqsa Mosque, which was built in 1876 by Mirza Ghulam Murtaza, the father of Mirza Ghulam Ahmad.^{[B1]} The first-ever Jamia Ahmadiyya was also established in Qadian in 1906 by Mirza Ghulam Ahmad, which continues to produce missionaries who serve mostly in India, and Middle East. Other key landmarks include:

- Bait ud Dua “House of Prayer”, the site where the founder of the Ahmadiyya Muslim Community, Mirza Ghulam Ahmad, used to offer his prayers.^{[B1]}
- Darul Futooh “Place of Victories” Mosque.^{[B1]}
- Anwaar Mosque
- Nasirabad “Land of the Helper of Allah” Mosque.^{[B1]}
- Sarae Tahir “the Tahir Inn” built as a guest house in memory of the Ahmadi Afghan martyr, Sahibzada Abdul Latif.^{[B1]}

Delhi

The Bait-ul-Hadi Mosque in the Tughlaqabad area of New Delhi is the sole purpose-built mosque of the Ahmadiyya Muslim Community.

Andhra Pradesh

- Jamay Mosque, built in 2003; and Noor Mosque^{[B1]}

Bihar

- Ahmadiyya Muslim mission houses established in Barahpura; Bhagalpur; Khanpur Milki; and Patna^{[B1]}

Gujarat

- Ahmadiyya Muslim mission house established in Ahmedabad^{[B1]}

Haryana

- Ahmadiyya Muslim mission house established in Jind^{[B1]}
- Ahmadiyya Muslim mission house established in Bhodia khera^{[B1]}

Jharkhand

- Ahmadiyya Mosque, Simliya Ranchi^{[B1]}

Karnataka

- Ahmadiyya Muslim mission houses established in Gulbarga and Yadgir^{[B1]}

Kashmir

- Ahmadiyya Mosque, Srinagar, the site of the tomb of Jesus^{[B1]}

Madhya Pradesh

- Ahmadiyya Muslim mission houses established in Itarsi; Gwalior; and Salichoka^{[B1]}

Maharashtra

- Ahmadiyya Muslim mission house established in Ballarpur^{[B1]}

Orissa

- Ahmadiyya Muslim mission houses established in Bhadrak; Bhubaneswar; Cuttack; Dhuan sahi; Gadpada; Haldipada; Keranga; Muktadeyi Pur; Pankal; Soro; and Sungrah^{[B1]}

Tamil Nadu

- Ahmadiyya Muslim mission houses established in Udangudi, Tuticorin; Kodambakkam, Chennai; Adambakkam, Chennai; Coimbatore; Melapalayam; Sattankukam; Kottar; Kaliyakkvilai; and Virdhunagar^{[B1]}

Uttar Pradesh

- Ahmadiyya Muslim mission houses established in Agra; Aroha; Bahuwa; Barely; Dharmpur; Faizabad; Gonda; Kanpur; Lucknow; Rath; Saharanpur; Shahjahanpur; Sitapur; Udaypur Kataiya; and Varanasi^{[B1]}

West Bengal

- Ahmadiyya Muslim Mission House on New Park Street in Park Circus, Kolkata.

=== Indonesia ===
- Established in Indonesia in 1925,^{[B1]} and grown to 500,000 Ahmadis, 300 missionaries, and more than 400 local branches, with 385 mosques, 174 mission houses and 36 schools^{[B1]}
  - Jamia Ahmadiyya, established in March 1982
  - Nasir Mosque^{[B1]}
  - An-Noor Mosque^{[B1]}
  - Ahmadiyya Muslim Community Guest Quarters and Mission House^{[B1]}

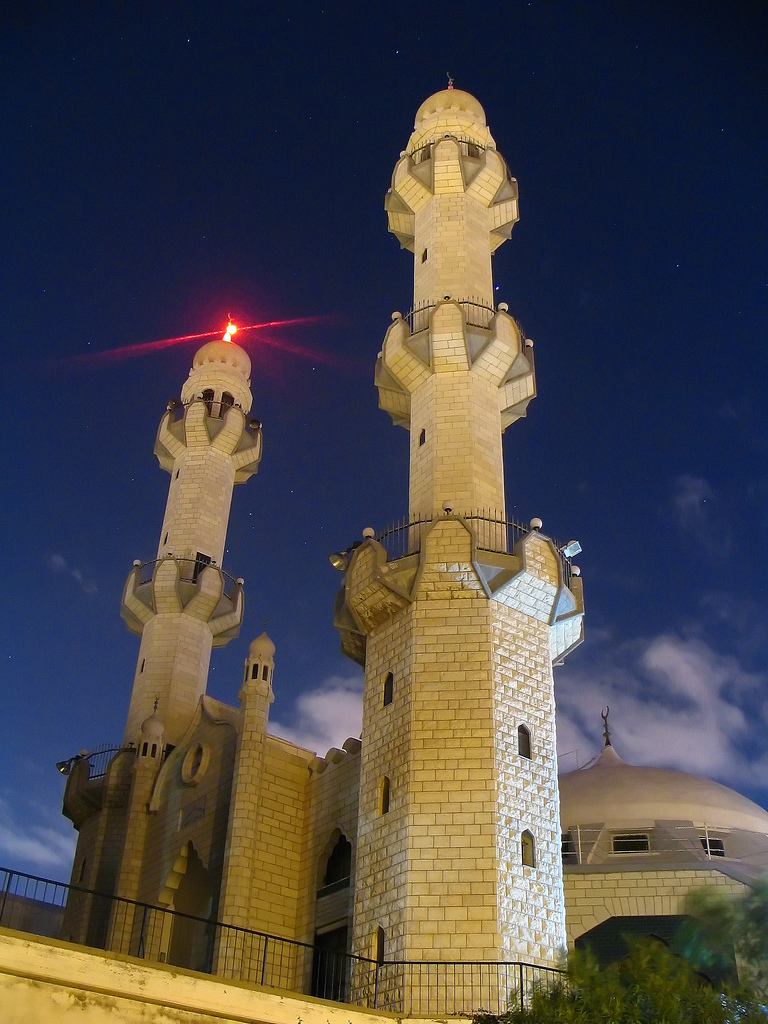
Ahmadiyya Mosque in Haifa

=== Israel ===
- Established in 1925 which was, at the time, the British Mandate of Palestine. After the UN Partition of Palestine, the community established its center in Haifa after 1947^{[B1]}
  - Mahmood Mosque on Mount Carmel, Kababir, Haifa, which acts as the National Headquarters^{[B1]}

=== Japan ===
- Established in Japan in 1935^{[B1]}
  - Ahmadiyya Mission House, Nagoya^{[B1]}
  - Darul Tabligh, Tokyo^{[B1]}
  - Bait ul Ahad, Tsushima, Aichi

=== Kazakhstan ===
- Established in Kazakhstan in 1991^{[B1]}
  - Ahmadiyya Muslim Mission House and Mosque, Almaty^{[B1]}

=== Malaysia ===
- Established in Malaysia in 1935^{[B1]}
  - Bait-us-Salam Mosque, Kuala Lumpur^{[B1]}

=== Myanmar ===
- Established in Myanmar in 1935^{[B1]}
  - Yangon Mosque, Yangon^{[B1]}
  - Ahmadiyya Mosque, Mawlamyaing^{[B1]}
  - Ahmadiyya Mosque, Mandalay^{[B1]}

=== Nepal ===
- An Ahmadiyya Muslim Mosque was constructed in Nepal in 2008

=== Philippines ===
- Established in the Philippines in 1985 and has 6 mosques, 5 mission houses, 5 local missionaries, 1 national missionary and is organized in 9 local chapters^{[B1]}
  - Ahmadiyya Mission House, Manila^{[B1]}

=== Russia ===
- Established in Russia in 1924^{[B1]}
  - Ahmadiyya Mission House, St. Petersburg^{[B1]}

=== Singapore ===
- Established in Singapore in 1935^{[B1]}
  - Taha Mosque^{[B1]} and mission house in 2006^{[B1]}

=== Sri Lanka ===
- Established in Sri Lanka in 1915^{[B1]}
  - Fazal Mosque, Negombo^{[B1]}
  - Bait-ul-Hamd Mosque, Colombo, also national headquarters^{[B1]}
  - Ahmadiyya Muslim Centre, Slave Island^{[B1]}
  - Ahmadiyya Muslim Mosque, Pasyala^{[B1]}

=== Thailand ===
- Established in Thailand in 1986^{[B1]}
  - Ahmadiyya Muslim Mission House, Bangkok^{[B1]}

=== Turkmenistan ===
- Established in Turkmenistan in 2010

== Africa ==
The Ahmadiyya Muslim Community had been established in all African countries by the year 2000.^{[B1]} The Ahmadiyya Muslim Community was introduced to Africa when several individuals living in East Africa became Ahmadis in 1900, during the life of Mirza Ghulam Ahmad.^{[B1]}

=== Benin ===
- The Ahmadiyya Muslim Community established itself here in 1957.^{[B1]}
- Ahmadiyya Mosque in Agonlin.^{[B1]}
- Ahmadiyya Mosque in Togouihoue.^{[B1]}
- Ahmadiyya Mosque in Lalo.^{[B1]}
- Ahmadiyya Mosque in Papatia.^{[B1]}
- Ahmadiyya Mosque in Manigri.^{[B1]}
- Ahmadiyya Mosque in Oke-Owo^{[B1]}
- Ahmadiyya Mosque in Godogossoun^{[B1]}
- Ahmadiyya Mosque in Suya.^{[B1]}
- Al-Mahdi mosque which is the largest mosque in Bénin, inaugurated April 27, 2008.^{[B1]}
- Baitul Tauheed Mosque inaugurated in 2004.^{[B1]}
- In 1993, 10,000 converts to the Ahmadiyya Muslim Community from Bénin.^{[B1]}
- In 2000, 801,000 converts.^{[B1]}
- In 2001, over 1.2 million converts, 328 local branches established within all 328 cities within the country, 228 chiefs and kings converted and 237 Sunni converted Ahmadiyya mosques along with their Imams.^{[B1]}
- Benin has 251 Ahmadiyya mosques, 77 mission houses and over 2 million adherents of the Ahmadiyya Muslim Community. As of 2002, 57 kings of various Beninous communities joined the Ahmadiyya Muslim Community.^{[B1]}

=== Burkina Faso ===
- The Ahmadiyya Muslim Community established itself here in 1986.^{[B1]}
- Al Mahdi Mosque in Ouagadougou^{[B1]}
- Ahmadiyya Muslim Mosque in Koudougou^{[B1]}
- Ahmadiyya Islamic Radio Station established (Radio Islamique Ahmadiyya FM104.1)^{[B1]}

=== Côte d'Ivoire ===
- The Ahmadiyya Muslim Community established itself here in 1961.^{[B1]}
- Ahmadiyya Mosque in Dagara located in the Dabakala district of the Vallée du Bandama region.^{[B1]}
- Ahmadiyya Mosque in Bouaké.^{[B1]}
- Ahmadiyya Mosque in Adjamé
- Ahmadiyya Mosque in San Pedro
- Ahmadiyya Mosque in Abengourou
- Ahmadiyya Hospital in Adjamé
- Ahmadiyya Primary Schools in Ajamé and Yopougon
- Ahmadiyya Mosque in Grand Bassam
- Ahmadiyya Mosque in Oumé
- Ahmadiyya Mosque in Bondoukou

=== The Gambia ===
- The Ahmadiyya Muslim Community established itself here in 1961.^{[B1]}
- Ahmadiyya Mosque in Saba^{[B1]}
- Ahmadiyya Mosque in Burock, a small village located in Foli Kansala which is one of the nine districts in the Western Division of The Gambia.^{[B1]}
- Ahmadiyya Mosque in Latrikunda, a locale within Serrekunda, largest city in The Gambia.^{[B1]}
- Baitus Salam Mosque in Talinding Kunjang.^{[B1]}
- First Ahmadi Governor-General of The Gambia, Al-Haj Sir Farimang Mamadi Singateh.^{[B1]}

=== Ghana ===
- The Ahmadiyya Muslim Community established itself here in 1921.^{[B1]}
- The Ahmadiyya Muslim Community and Mirza Masroor Ahmad makes the claim of growing wheat for the first time in Ghana. He was sent to Ghana with the role of being an agriculturalist, philanthropist and principle of the Ahmadiyya Secondary School Salaga before becoming the present Khalifah of the Ahmadiyya Muslim Community.
- Ahmadiyya Muslim Mosque in Accra^{[B1]}
- Ahmadiyya population in Ghana increases 5 fold after one year of being established in 1921.^{[B1]}
- Ahmadiyya Secondary Schools in Kumasi, Asokore, Fomena, Salaga, Essarkyir, Potsin and Wa.^{[B1]}
- Nasia Mosque in northern Ghana.^{[B1]}
- Ahmadiyya Mosque in Salaga^{[B1]}
- Ahmadiyya Mosque in Kokobila^{[B1]}
- Ahmadiyya Mosque in Pramso^{[B1]}
- Nusrat Jehan Mosque in Wa^{[B1]}
- Ahmadiyya Mosque in Techiman^{[B1]}
- Kumasi Central Mosque in Kumasi^{[B1]}
- Ahmadiyya Mosque in Mangoase^{[B1]}
- Baitul Aleem Mosque in Abura^{[B1]}
- Ahmadiyya Mosque in Daboase^{[B1]}
- Asokore Hospital in Ashanti Region^{[B1]}
- Baitul Habib Mosque in Kumasi^{[B1]}
- Taleem-ul-Islam School in Kumasi, first school established in Africa by the Ahmadiyya Muslim Community^{[B1]}
- Daboase Hospital in Daboase^{[B1]}
- Taleem-ul-Islam School in Gomoa Poston^{[B1]}
- Ahmadiyya Hospital in Agona Swedru^{[B1]}
- Ahmadiyya Secondary School in Ekumfi Essarkyir^{[B1]}
- Jamia Ahmadiyya (Missionary Training College) established in Ghana in March 1966.^{[B1]}
- IT Institute established by Humanity First, which is affiliated by the Ahmadiyya Muslim Community in Ghana in the year 2007.
- Bustan-e-Ahmad (Gardens of Ahmad) plot of land owned by the Community for Annual Conventions, bought in 2004.
- Bagh-e-Ahmad (Gardens of Ahmad) plot of land owned by the Community for Annual Conventions, bought in 2008.
- 2-5 million Ahmadis in Ghana in the year 2007.^{[B1]}

=== Kenya ===
- The Ahmadiyya Muslim Community established itself here in 1900.^{[B1]}
- Ahmadiyya Mosque in Nairobi^{[B1]}
- 68 Ahmadiyya Mosques throughout the country^{[B1]}
- Ahmadiyya Hall (three-story building) inaugurated in 2005.^{[B1]}
- Ahmadiyya Mosque in Navaisha^{[B1]}
- Ahmadiyya Mosque in Nukoro^{[B1]}
- Ahmadiyya Mosque in Banja^{[B1]}
- Mission House in Eldoret^{[B1]}
- Parklands Primary School in Nairobi^{[B1]}

=== Lesotho ===
- The Ahmadiyya Muslim Community established itself here in 1999.^{[B1]}
- Baitul Mahdi Mosque in Thaba-Bosiu^{[B1]}
- There are 350 Ahmadis in Lesotho in 7 local branches.^{[B1]}

=== Liberia ===
- The Ahmadiyya Muslim Community established itself here in 1956.^{[B1]}
- A college professor is the first convert to the Ahmadiyya Muslim Community in 1917.^{[B1]}
- Baitul Mujeeb Mosque in Monrovia. It was originally built in 1986 but suffered fire damage in 1996 during the First Liberian Civil War. It was reconstructed on July 7, 2000.^{[B1]}
- Foundation stone laid for Tubmanburg Mosque in 2007^{[B1]}
- Ahmadiyya Mission House in Gohn Town, Grand Cape Mount County^{[B1]}
- Ahmadiyya Central Library in Monrovia inaugurated in 2008^{[B1]}
- Masroor Ahmadiyya Elementary, Junior & Senior High School in Tiene Town, Grand Cape Mount County.
- Shah Taj Ahmadiyya Elementary, Junior & Senior High School was started in 1996 buy Mr.M.A.Bajwah, the former Amir and Missionary In charge, Liberia with the approval of Hadhrat Mirza Tahir Ahmad, 4th Caliph of Ahmadiyya Muslim Jama'at. Mansoor Ahmad Nasir is the first principal of the school. The school is presently located in Tweh Farm, Monrovia.

=== Madagascar ===
- The Ahmadiyya Muslim Community established itself here in the 1980s.^{[B1]}
- Baitun Nasir Mosque in Andranomadio^{[B1]}
- Ahmadiyya Mission House in Madagascar^{[B1]}

=== Mauritius ===
- The Ahmadiyya Muslim Community established itself here in 1913.^{[B1]}
- Nusrat Mosque in Quatre Bornes^{[B1]}
- Baitul Zikr Mosque in Rose-Hill^{[B1]}
- Noor Mosque in Pailles^{[B1]}
- Dar-us-Salam Mosque, which was the first mosque built in Mauritius and the central mosque in Rose Hill, Mauritius^{[B1]}
- Mubarak Mosque in Montagne Blanche. It was renovated in 1961 into a concrete structure which was financed by the local Ahmadis^{[B1]}
- Bait-us-Salam Mosque in New Grove.^{[B1]}
- Tahir Mosque in Quartier Millitiare^{[B1]}
- Ahmadiyya Mosque in Casernes^{[B1]}
- Fazal Mosque in Phoenix^{[B1]}
- Usman Mosque in Stanley^{[B1]}
- Rizwan Mosque in St. Pierre^{[B1]}
- Umar Mosque in Triolet^{[B1]}
- Noor Muhammad Noroya, first Mauritian convert to the Ahmadiyya Muslim Community^{[B1]}
- French Ahmadiyya newspaper called ‘Islamism’ established by Noor Muhammad Noroya.^{[B1]}

Rodrigues Island

- Mahmood Mosque, La ferme^{[B1]}
- Noor mosque, Port Mathurin

=== Niger ===
- The Ahmadiyya Muslim Community established itself here in 1956.^{[B1]}
- Mahmood Mosque in Duobo, Niamey Region^{[B1]}
- Noor Mosque in Algada, Marawi Region^{[B1]}

=== Nigeria ===
- The Ahmadiyya Muslim Community established itself here in 1916.^{[B1]}
- Baitur-Raheem Mosque in Ibadan inaugurated in 2008
- Ahmadiyya Central Mosque in Sabo Quarter, Ilaro Town, Ogun State^{[B1]}
- Mubarak Mosque in Abuja, which is the last Ahmadiyya mosque, built in the first century of the Ahmadiyya Caliphate.^{[B1]}^{[B1]}
- Tahir Mosque in Ojokoro^{[B1]}
- Ahmadiyya Mosque in Orita, Ilaro Town, Ogun State^{[B1]}
- Owode Mosque in Ogun State^{[B1]}
- Hadeeqa-e-Ahmad, a plot of land bought for Annual Conventions.^{[B1]}
- Auxiliary Guest Houses in Lagos^{[B1]}
- Ahmadiyya General Hospital in Apapa^{[B1]}
- Ahmadiyya Muslim Weekly newspaper (first Muslim weekly newspaper in the country) called ‘The Truth’^{[B1]}
- Jamia Ahmadiyya (Missionary Training College) in Ilaro, Ogun State^{[B1]}
- The Qur'an translated into several Nigerian dialects, including Yoruba, Hausa, Igo, Etsako and Tiv^{[B1]}
- Hafiz class in Nigeria (Class for the teaching of the memorization of the whole Qur’an).^{[B1]}

=== Sierra Leone ===
- The Ahmadiyya Muslim Community established itself here in 1937.^{[B1]}
- Ahmadiyya Mosque in Gbonkobana^{[B1]}
- Ahmadiyya Mosque in Gbendembu^{[B1]}
- Ahmadiyya Mosque in Kailahun^{[B1]}
- Ahmadiyya Mosque in Makeni^{[B1]}
- Ahmadiyya Mosque in Bo^{[B1]}
- There are 573 mosques, 19 central missionaries, 131 local missionaries, 184 Ahmadiyya primary schools and 50 secondary schools in Sierra Leone^{[B1]}
- Ahmadiyya Muslim Radio Station established in 2007^{[B1]}

=== South Africa ===
- The Ahmadiyya Muslim Community established itself here in 1946.^{[B1]}
- Baitul Awwal Mosque in Cape Town^{[B1]}

=== Swaziland ===
- The Ahmadiyya Muslim Community established itself here in 1997.^{[B1]}
- Baitul Hadi Mosque in Hiatikulu, which is the first Ahmadiyya mosque in Swaziland and the only mosque in the region whereupon the mosque is located in.^{[B1]}
- There are over 250 Ahmadis in Swaziland.^{[B1]}

=== Tanzania ===
- The Ahmadiyya Muslim Community established itself here in 1934.^{[B1]}
- Qur'an translated into Swahili in 1936^{[B1]}
- Ahmadiyya newspaper established in 1936 called ‘Mapenzi ya Munga’ (The Love of God).^{[B1]}
- The first ever English language Muslim newspaper called ‘East African Times’ established by the late MM Ahmad (former vice-president of the World Bank, Pakistani civil servant, Amir of the USA Ahmadiyya Community and Amir of East African countries. He translated the Qur'an into Swahili)^{[B1]}
- Ahmadiyya Primary School opened in 1940^{[B1]}
- Tanzania was formerly named ‘Tangantika’. The Ahmadiyya Muslim Community was involved with the struggle of independence of the country and an Ahmadi, Mohammed Iqbal Dar, coined the name ‘Tanzania’ for the country.^{[B1]}
- Kitonga Ahmadiyya Mosque in Dar-es-Salaam^{[B1]}
- Salam Mosque in Dar-es-Salaam^{[B1]}
- Baitul Hamid Mosque in Dodoma^{[B1]}
- Fazal Mosque inaugurated in 1947 in Tabora, which is popularly known as the ‘Taj Mahal of East Africa’^{[B1]}

=== Uganda ===
- The Ahmadiyya Muslim Community established itself here in 1935.^{[B1]}
- Oil found in Uganda for the first time in history due to the help offered by the Ahmadiyya Muslim Community.
- Ahmadiyya Central Mosque in Kampala which has 6 minarets and can hold up to 9,000 worshippers.^{[B1]}
- Ahmadiyya Muslim Mosque in Iganga^{[B1]}
- There are several mosques, high schools, elementary schools in Uganda and also a hospital in the town of Mbale which has a maternity ward and modern radiology technology, established by the Ahmadiyya Muslim Community in Uganda^{[B1]}
- Qur'an translated into the local Ugandan language.^{[B1]}

== Europe ==
The Ahmadiyya Muslim Community was introduced to Europe in 1907 when, in response to Mirza Ghulam Ahmad’s messages to Europe, a German woman converted to the Ahmadiyya Muslim Community.^{[B1]} The Ahmadiyya Muslim Community is established in all European countries except for Latvia, Slovakia and Greece, though there are individual members of the Ahmadiyya Muslim Community within the latter which consist of mostly Arabs and a small number of indigenous Greeks.^{[B1]}

=== Albania ===
- The Ahmadiyya Muslim Community established itself here in c. 1934.^{[B1]}
- Baitul Awwal Mosque in Tirana which is one of the largest mosques in Albania.^{[B1]}
- Darul Falah Mission House in Tirana^{[B1]}

=== Austria ===
- The Ahmadiyya Muslim Community established itself here in c. 1936.^{[B1]} Website: Ahmadiyya Muslim Community Austria
- Ahmadiyya Mission House in Vienna^{[B1]}

=== Belgium ===
- The Ahmadiyya Muslim Community established itself here in c. 1982.^{[B1]} Website: Ahmadiyya Muslim Community Belgium
- Baitul Mujeeb Mosque in Uccle inaugurated in 2020
- Baitun Noor in the city of Lier
- Baitur Raheem Mosque in Alken
- Baitus Salam Mosque in Dilbeek a town just outside the capital city of Brussels inaugurated in 1985
- Darul Tabligh Aziz in the Flemish city of Antwerp.

=== Bosnia and Herzegovina ===
- The Ahmadiyya Muslim Community established itself here in 1996.^{[B1]}
- Baitul Islam Mosque in Sarajevo inaugurated in 2004^{[B1]}

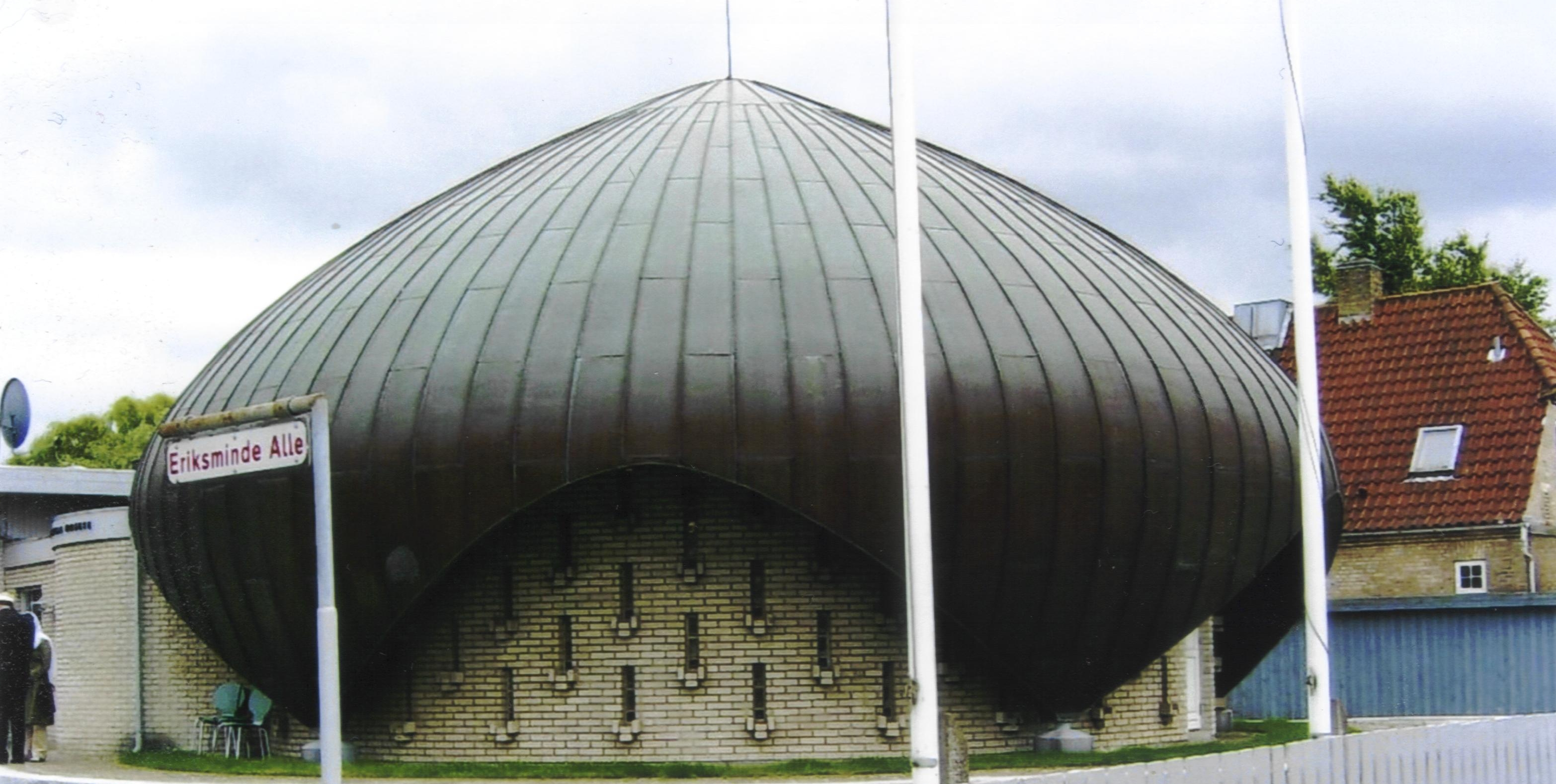
Nusrat Jehan Mosque in Copenhagen

=== Denmark ===
- The Ahmadiyya Muslim Community established itself here in 1959.^{[B1]}
- Nusrat Djahan Mosque in Copenhagen in 1967 (55°39′3.5″N 12°28′44.25″E)^{[B1]}

=== Faroe Islands ===
- The Ahmadiyya Muslim Community established itself here in 2010.

=== France ===
- The Ahmadiyya Muslim Community established itself here in 1946.^{[B1]} Website: Ahmadiyya Muslim Community France
- Moubarak Mosque in Saint-Prix, Allier^{[B1]}
- Baitul Ataa Mosque in Trie-Château
- Mahdi Mosque, Hurtigheim
- Noor Mosque in Beuvrages^{[B1]}

=== Germany ===
- The Ahmadiyya Muslim Community established itself here in 1923 in Berlin. (52°39′15.2″N 13°18′41.5″E)^{[B1]} Website: Ahmadiyya Muslim Community Germany
- German Headquarter Baitus Sabuh (50°11′30.6″N 8°39′28.2″E)
- Jamia Ahmadiyya Germany opened on 17 December 2012 by Khalifatul Masih V(atba) in Riedstadt, near the city Darmstadt.
- As of June 2020, 61 mosques were completed in Germany under the 100-Mosques-Plan.

Baden-Württemberg

- Bait-ul-Ahad Mosque in Bruchsal
- Eshan Mosque in Mannheim
- Bait-ul-Jame Mosque in Offenbach am Main
- Baitul Baqi Mosque in Pforzheim
- Baitul Afiyat Mosque in Waldshut-Tiengen
- Qamar Mosque in Weil der Stadt

Bavaria

- Bait-un-Naseer Mosque in Augsburg
- Gebetszentrum in Augsburg^{[B1]}
- Al-Mahdi Mosque in Neufahrn bei Freising
- Baitul Aleem Mosque in Würzburg^{[B1]}

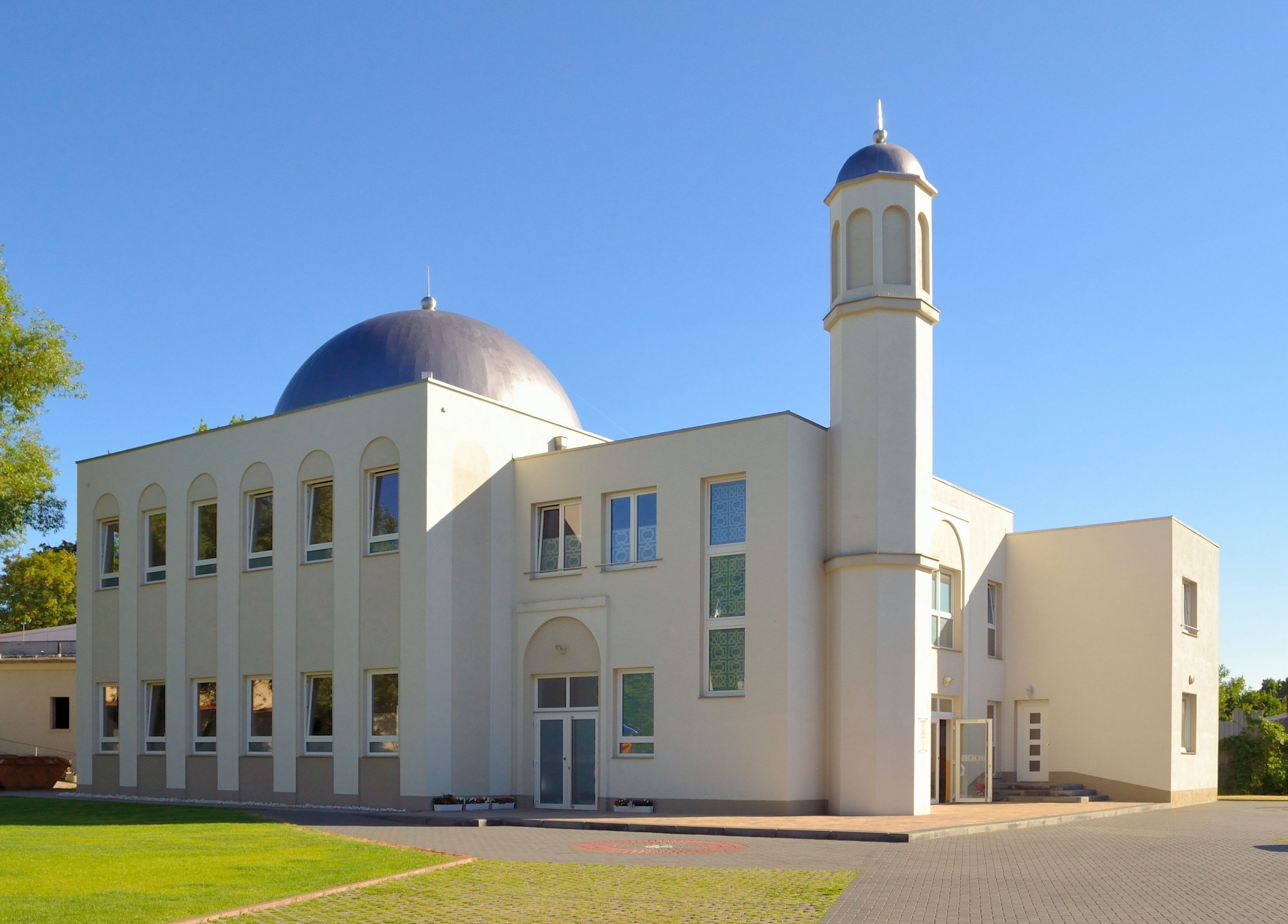
Khadija Mosque in Berlin

Berlin

- Khadija Mosque built in 2008 in Berlin, the first mosque of the Ahmadiyya Muslim Community built in Berlin^{[B1]}
- Bait ul Malik Mosque in Berlin Reinickendorf

Bremen

- Nasir Mosque in Bremen^{[B1]}
- Baitul Wakeel Mosque in Bremerhaven^{[B1]}

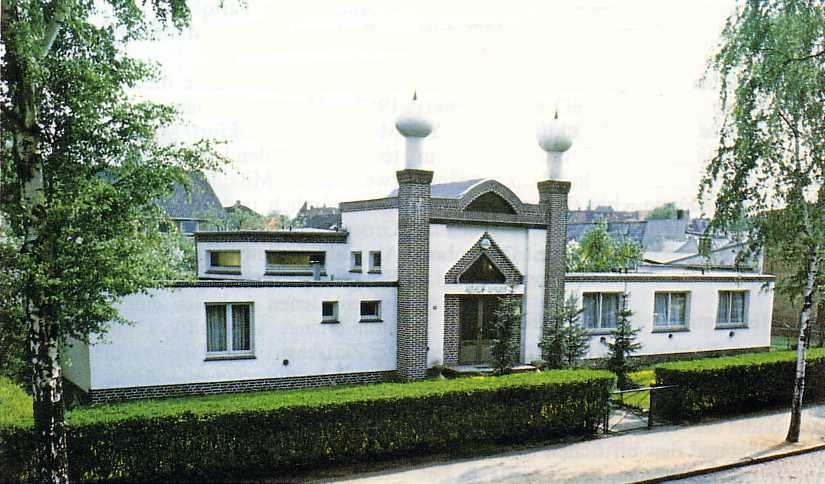
Fazle Omar Mosque in Hamburg

Hamburg

- Baitur Rashid Mosque in Hamburg^{[B1]}
- Fazl-e-Omar Mosque in Hamburg, the first mosque constructed by the Ahmadiyya Muslim Community in Germany and also the first mosque built in Germany after World War II^{[B1]}

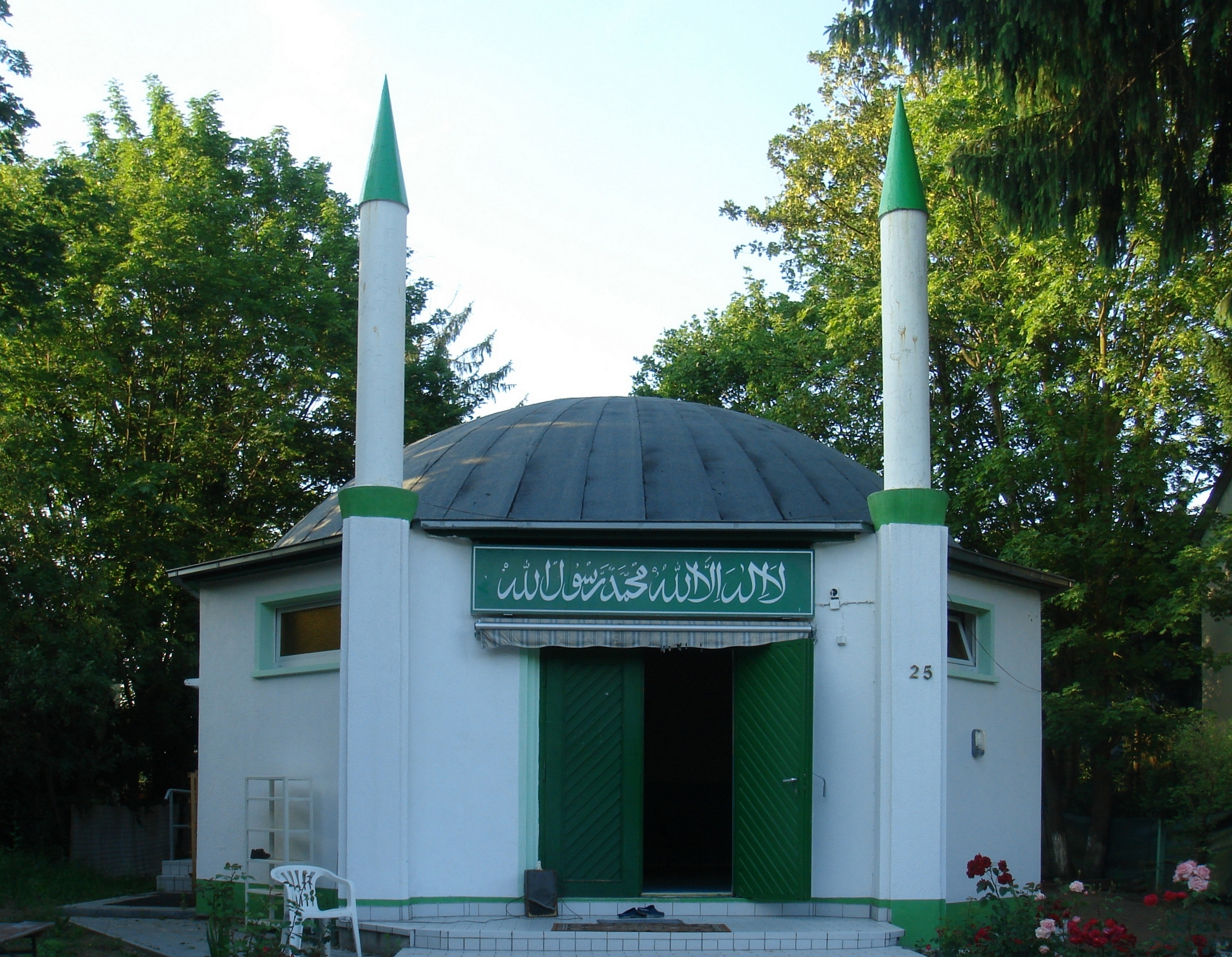
Noor Mosque in Frankfurt

Hesse

- Bashier Mosque in Bensheim
- Noor ud Din Mosque in Darmstadt^{[B1]}
- Baitul Baqi Mosque in Dietzenbach
- Baitul Aafiyyat Mosque in Frankfurt
- Baitul Qayyum Mosque in Frankfurt^{[B1]}
- Baitus Sabuh in Frankfurt^{[B1]}
- Noor Mosque in Frankfurt, notable for the fact that the U.S. heavyweight boxing champion, Muhammad Ali prayed within it
- Dar-ul-Amaan Mosque in Friedberg
- Bait-ul-Hamid Mosque in Fulda
- Baitus Samad Mosque in Giessen
- Baitul Ghafur Mosque in Ginsheim-Gustavsburg
- Bait-ul-Shakoor Mosque in Groß-Gerau^{[B1]}
- Baitul Wahid Mosque in Hanau
- Baitul Zafar Mosque in Immenhausen^{[B1]}
- Mahmud Mosque in Kassel^{[B1]}
- Bait-ul-Ahad Mosque in Limburg an der Lahn
- Mahdi Abad Mosque in Limburg an der Lahn
- Baitul Aman Mosque in Nidda
- Aziz Mosque in Riedstadt^{[B1]}
- Gebetszentrum in Schlüchtern^{[B1]}
- Baitul Huda Mosque built in 2004 in Usingen^{[B1]}
- Baitul Muqiet Mosque in Wabern
- Mubarak Mosque in Wiesbaden

Lower Saxony

- Gebetszentrum in Hannover^{[B1]}
- Sami Mosque in Hannover
- Basharat Mosque in Osnabrück^{[B1]}
- Baitul Karim Mosque in Stade
- Nasir Mosque in Stuhr
- Baitul Qaadir Mosque in Vechta

North Rhine-Westphalia

- Mansoor Mosque in Aachen
- Baitun Nasr Mosque in Cologne^{[B1]}
- Baitul Nasir Mosque in Isselburg
- Salam Mosque in Iserlohn
- Baitil Momin Mosque in Münster-Hiltrup^{[B1]}

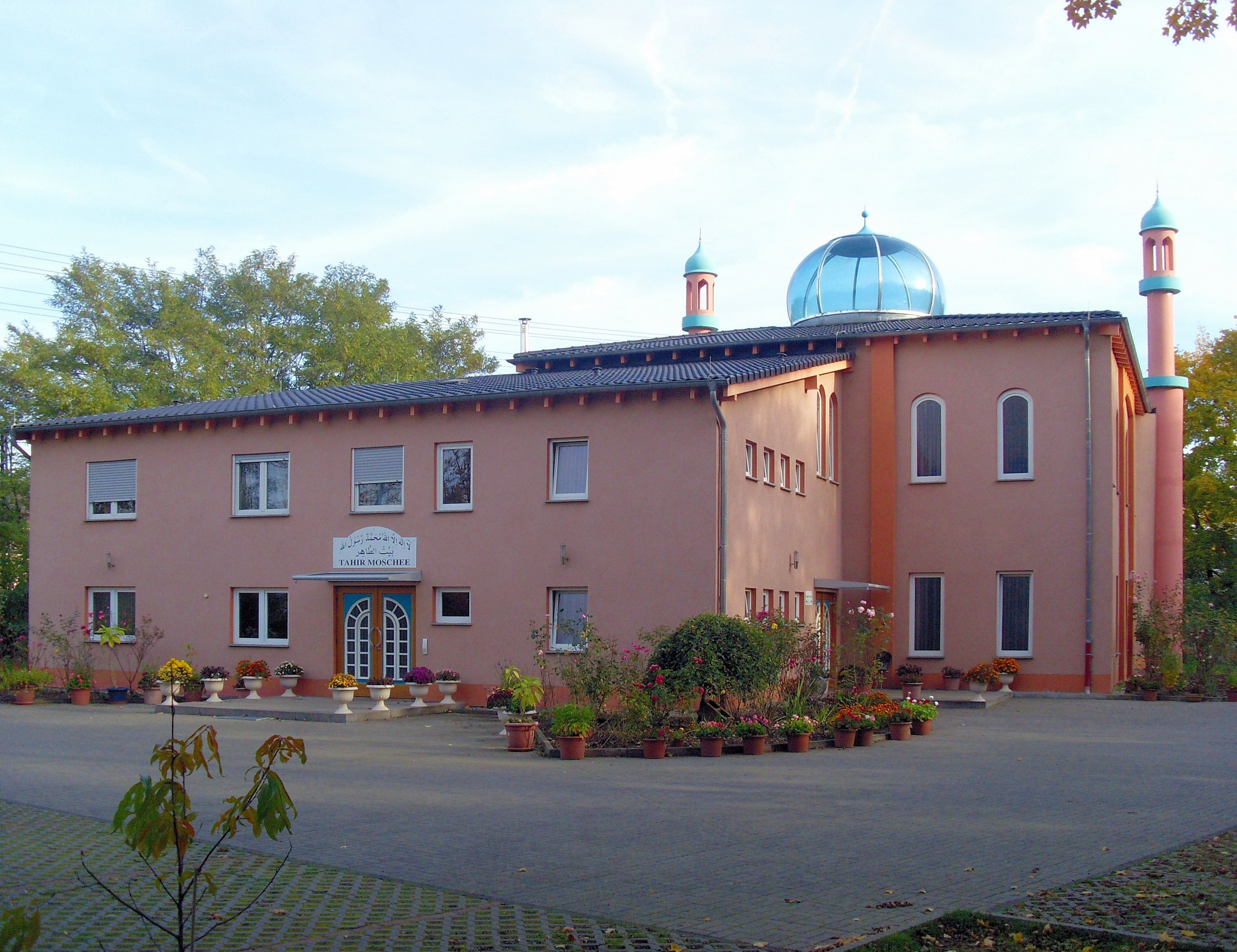
Tahir Mosque in Koblenz

Rhineland-Palitanate

- Tahir Mosque in Koblenz^{[B1]}
- Hamd Mosque in Wittlich^{[B1]}

Schleswig-Holstein

- Habib Mosque in Kiel^{[B1]}
- Bait-ul-Afiyat Mosque in Lübeck

=== Ireland ===
- The Ahmadiyya Muslim Community established itself here in 2001.^{[B1]} Website: Ahmadiyya Muslim Community UK & Ireland
- Maryam Mosque in Galway is the first purpose-build mosque in Galway.

=== Kosovo ===
- The Ahmadiyya Muslim Community established itself here in 1947.^{[B1]} Website: Ahmadiyya Muslim Community Kosovo
- The Ahmadiyya Center in Prishtina^{[B1]}

=== Luxembourg ===
- The Ahmadiyya Muslim Community established itself here in 2012. Website: Ahmadiyya Muslim Community Luxembourg

=== Netherlands ===
- The Ahmadiyya Muslim Community established itself here in 1947.^{[B1]} Website: Ahmadiyya Muslim Community Holland
- Mubarak Mosque in The Hague was first purpose-built mosque in the Netherlands. It was inaugurated by Sir Muhammad Zafrulla Khan, an Ahmadi, who was serving as the President and Head Judge of the International Court of Justice at The Hague.^{[B1]}
- Baitun Noor Mosque Nunspeet inaugurated in 1985.
- Baitul Mahmood Mission house inaugurated in 2008.
- Baitul Afiyat Mosque in Almere inaugurated in 2019

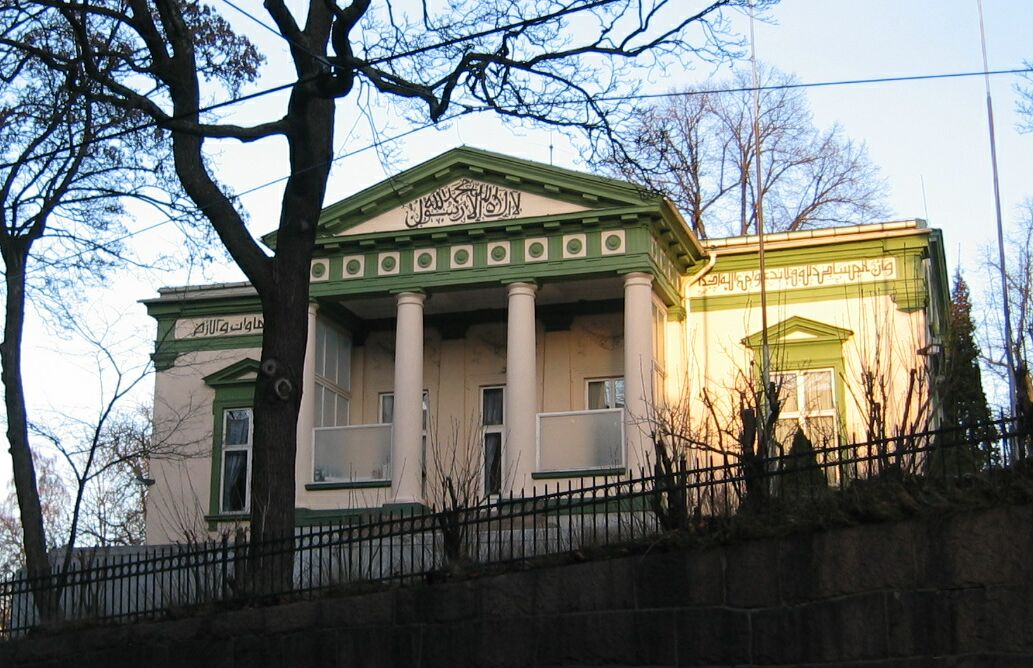
Mosque in Oslo

=== Norway ===
- The Ahmadiyya Muslim Community established itself here in 1958.^{[B1]} Website: http://www.alislam.no
- Noor Mosque in Oslo August 1, 1980^{[B1]}
- Baitun Nasr mosque at outskirts of Oslo Norway which is the largest mosque in Scandinavia.^{[B1]}
- Maryam mosque in city of Kristiansand in South Norway.

=== Poland ===
One of the Ahmadi representatives, Ayyaz Khan, visited Poland in 1937 to establish Ahmadiyya mission in the country. His work was disrupted by the outbreak of World War II in 1939. 60 years later, Stowarzyszenie Muzułmańskie Ahmadiyya (Ahmadiyya Muslim Community) was officially registered as an Islamic religious organisation with the government on December 3, 1990. It owns a freestanding house in Warsaw that acts as its mosque, educational center and missionary headquarters.

=== Portugal ===
- The Ahmadiyya Muslim Community established itself here in 1957.^{[B1]}
- Ahmadiyya Mission Houses

=== Spain ===
- The Ahmadiyya Muslim Community established itself here in 1946.^{[B1]} Website: Comunidad Ahmadía en España
- Basharat Mosque (Spanish: Mezquita Basharat), which is the first mosque to be built after 750 years in Spain, built in Pedro Abad near Cordoba in 1982.^{[B1]}
- Baitur Rahman Mosque is the second mosque built in Spain by Ahmadiyya Muslim Community in Valencia. It was inaugurated by head of the worldwide Ahmadiyya Muslim Community Mirza Masroor Ahmad on 29 March 2013.

=== Sweden ===
- The Ahmadiyya Muslim Community established itself here in 1956.^{[B1]}
- Nasir Mosque in Gothenburg built in 1963, inaugurated on August 20, 1976, torn and rebuilt in 2000.^{[B1]}
- Mahmood Mosque in Malmö finished 2016.
- Baitul Hamd Mosque in Malmö

=== Switzerland ===
- The Ahmadiyya Muslim Community established itself here in 1946.^{[B1]}
- Mahmood Mosque built in Zürich in 1963.^{[B1]}
- Nuur Mosque in Wigoltingen

=== United Kingdom ===
- The Ahmadiyya Muslim Community established itself here in 1912. It is the present place acting as the International Headquarters of the Community. (51°11′27″N 0°45′4″W)^{[B1]}
- Hadeeqa-tul Mahdi (Oakland Farm) (51°8′5″N 0°54′37″W) is a large patch of land in Alton with a few large halls used for the Annual International Conventions of the Ahmadiyya Muslim Community which are held in the UK as that is the place of the International Headquarters of the Ahmadiyya Muslim Community.^{[B1]}Panoramio: Hadeeqatul Mahdi – UK during Annual Convention
- Islamabad (51°11′27″N 0°45′4″W), is a piece of land in Tilford, Surrey, is owned by the Ahmadiyya Muslim Community and contains the new Mubarak Mosque. As the new residence of the Supreme Worldwide Head of the community it is reminiscent of Rabwah (as they were both locations essentially pieces of land established by the Ahmadiyya Muslim Community as International Headquarters)^{[B1]}
- Jamia Ahmadiyya (University for Religious Theology) which is located in Haslemere, Surrey. (51°05′39″N 0°44′14″W)^{[B1]}Jamia Ahmadiyya UK, Jamia Ahmadiyya, Morden – UK (Photo)
- Baitus Salam Mosque in Islamabad (Tilford) is now known as Mubarak Mosque newly built on the same site.^{[B1]}

The first mosque built in London in 1924

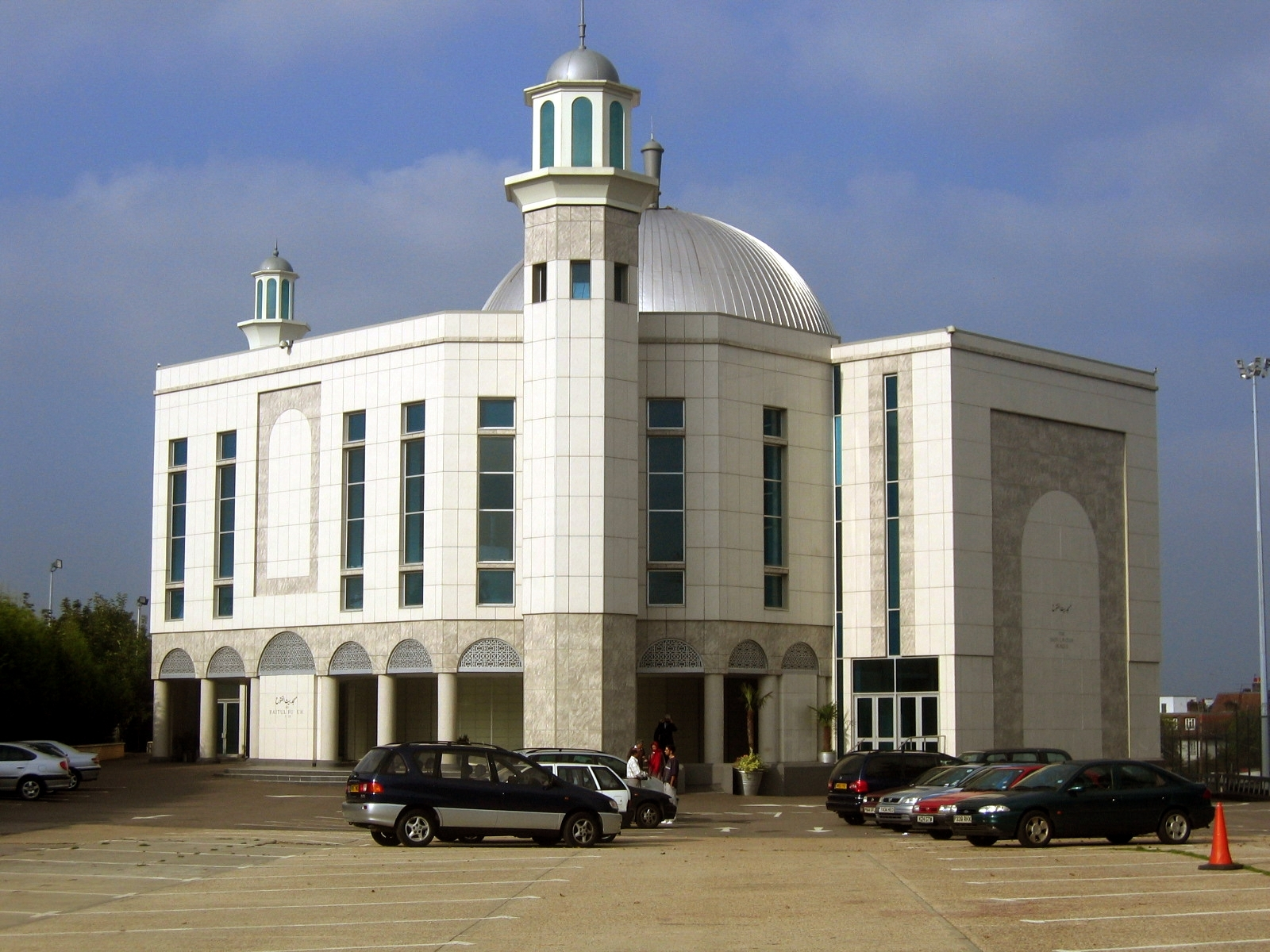
Baitul Futuh in London

==== England ====
London

- The first mosque built in London in 1924, Fazl Mosque is the only mosque to date with the distinction of being called ‘The London Mosque’ and served as the International Headquarters of the Ahmadiyya Muslim Community for 35 years up till April 2019.^{[B1]}
- The largest mosque in Western Europe, built in 2003, Baitul Futuh Mosque “House of Victories” is located south of London in Morden, Surrey and serves as the National Headquarters of the Ahmadiyya Muslim Association UK. It broadcasts Muslim Television Ahmadiyya International as well as Voice of Islam Radio 24/7.^{[B1]}
- Baitul Ehsan Mosque in Mitcham (It accommodates a number of national offices in a multi-storey office block)
- Baitus Subhan Mosque in Croydon^{[B1]}
- Baitul Wahid Mosque in Feltham
- Baitul Ahad Mosque in Plaistow^{[B1]}
- Baitul Aman Mosque in Hayes
- Darus Salaam Mosque in Southall^{[B1]}
- Tahir Mosque in Catford
- Baitun Noor Mosque in Hounslow (327 Martindale Rd, Hounslow TW4 7HG)
- Ahmadiyya Center in Tooting^{[B1]}

North East

- Baitul Ata in Newcastle
- Nasir Mosque in Hartlepool^{[B1]}

North West

- Baitul Aziz – Ahmadiyya Muslim Community Centre in Horwich, Bolton
- Baitul Lateef Mosque in Liverpool (309 Breck Road Liverpool L5 6PU)^{[B1]}
- Baitul Rasheed Mosque in Blackburn (Pleasington House Pleasington Street Blackburn BB2 1UF)
- Darul Aman Mosque in Manchester^{[B1]}

South East

- Mubarak Mosque in Tilford
- Nasir Mosque, Gillingham^{[B1]}
- Noor Mosque in Crawley
- Baitul Shukoor Mosque in Oxford^{[B1]} (257 Cowley Road Oxford, OX4 1XQ)

East Midlands

- Baitul Ikram Mosque in Leicester^{[B1]}
- Baitul Hafeez Mosque in Nottingham

East of England

- Baitul Mueed Islamic Centre in Cambridge (60 Mowbray Road Cambridge CB1 7SY)^{[B1]}

West Midlands

- Darul Barakaat Mosque in Birmingham opened in 2004^{[B1]}
- Baitul Ata Mosque in Wolverhampton
- Baitul Ehsan Mosque in Leamington Spa
- Baitul Ghafoor Mosque in Halesowen
- Baitul Muqeet Mosque in Walsall

Yorkshire and the Humber

- Al-Mahdi Mosque in Bradford
- Baitul Hamd Mosque in Bradford^{[B1]}
- Baitul Afiyat Mosque in Sheffield^{[B1]}
- Baitul Tauhid Mosque Huddersfield^{[B1]}
- Baitus Samad Mosque in Huddersfield^{[B1]}(41 Lower Fitzwilliam St, Huddersfield HD1 6AS)
- Baitus Salaam Mosque in Scunthorpe^{[B1]} (53 Cliff Closes Road Scunthorpe DN15 7HT)
- Baitul Ata Mosque in Dewsbury (Garnett St Staincliffe Dewsbury WF13 4AT)

==== Scotland ====
- Baitul Mehmood in Dundee
- Baitur Rahman Mosque in Glasgow^{[B1]}

==== Wales ====
- Baitur Raheem Mosque, Cardiff (Sanatorium Rd, Cardiff CF11 8DG)
- Sadiq Mosque in Rhyl (19a Warren Rd, Rhyl LL18 1DP)

== North America ==
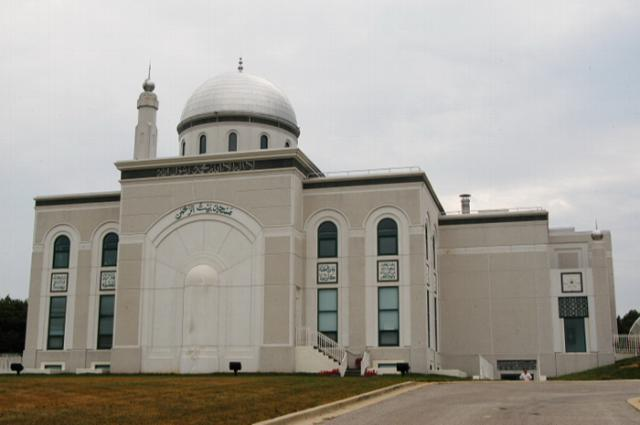
Baitur Rahman, Washington

The Ahmadiyya Muslim Community was introduced to North America in 1921, with the pioneering efforts of the missionary Mufti Muhammad Sadiq.^{[B1]} The first country to receive the Ahmadiyya Muslim Community was the United States where it appealed mainly to the African-American population though with some Caucasians. Many eminent jazz musicians converted to the Ahmadiyya Muslim Community like Sahib Shihab, Art Blakey (Abdullah ibn Buhaina) and Yusef Lateef.

=== Canada ===
- The Ahmadiyya Muslim Community established itself here in 1967.^{[B1]} Website: Ahmadiyya Muslim Community Canada. It has about 50 Local Chapters scattered across the country concentrating mainly in southern Ontario. The community has a good relationship with the government and it helps in humanitarian causes regularly across the country. The community is very active in faith outreach and has held hundreds of interfaith religious events across the country as far north as Yellowknife and White Horse.

Name	Images	Province	City	Year	G	Remarks
Baitun Nur		Alberta	Calgary	2008	AMJ	*“House of Light” Mosque, the largest mosque in Canada, opened in 2008 in Calgary.^{[B1]}
Baitul Hadi Mosque		Alberta	Edmonton		AMJ	Serves the local chapter of Ahmadiyya Muslim in Edmonton.^{[B1]}
Baitul Amaan Mosque		Saskatchewan	Lloydminster	2015	AMJ	Serves the local chapter of Ahmadiyya Muslim Community in Lloydminster.
Baitur Rehman		British Columbia	Delta,	2013	AMJ	The mosque serves the Vancouver Ahmadiyya Muslim Local Chapters Masjid: Baitur Rehman.^{[B1]}
Ahmaddiya Centre Mosque		Manitoba	Winnipeg		AMJ	The Ahmaddiya Centre-Mosque in Winnipeg serves the local Ahmadiyya Chapter of Winnipeg.
Ahmadiyya Muslim Center		Saskatchewan	Regina	2011/2012	AMJ	Located in the City Center, an official mosque is under construction in the city on a bought plot the contract for which was signed in July 2013. Estimated time of completion is mid of 2016.^{[B1]}
Darur Rahmat Mosque		Saskatchewan	Saskatoon, SK		AMJ	*Serves the local chapter of Saskatoon but a much larger mosque is under construction in the south eastern sub urban area on an eight-acre plot which was bought in the late 1980s. The foundation stone was laid during the time of the fourth Khalifa.^{[B1]}
Baitul Hafeez Mosque		Nova Scotia	Sydney, Nova Scotia	2004	AMJ	*The Ahmadiyya Muslim Jamaat of Sydney Chapter's mosque serves as the center of the Jamaat for Eastern Canada.
Mission House		Nova Scotia	Sydney, Nova Scotia	2004	AMJ	*The Ahmadiyya Muslim Jamaat of Sydney Chapter's Mission House (2009), which is adjacent to Baitul Hafeez Mosque, is furnished and serves as a guest house for visitors from outside Nova Scotia.
Ahmadiyya Abode of Peace		Ontario	North York		AMJ	*A 14-story building run by the Ahmadiyya Muslim Community and predominantly inhabited by Ahmadis making up 98 percent of the nearly 150 families living in the building. A hall on the first floor of the building serves as the gathering center for the local chapter.^{[B1]}
Bait-ul Kareem Mosque		Ontario	Cambridge Kitchener-Waterloo, Ontario	2006	AMJ	local mosque for the Ahmadi Muslim Community's local chapter; It was bought as a church and converted to a mosque.^{[B1]}
Baitul Mahdi		Ontario	Durham Oshawa	2005/6	AMJ	* A converted Mosque from a Dutch style castle was brought by a member of the Jamaat in 2005 and later donated to the Ahmadiyya Muslim Community to serve as Mosque and center for the local chapters of Oshawa and Durham. The property includes an 18.5-acre plot and has also regularly used by the Jamaat for regional sports events. The opening of the Masjid Al Mahdi took place in July 2006 during the visit of Khalifatul Masih the fifth to Canada.^{[B1]}
Bait-ul Islam “House of Islam (Peace and Submission)”		Ontario	Maple, Toronto,	1992	AMJ	Adjacent to the Peace Village the largest mosque in Ontario acts as the National Headquarters of the Ahmadiyya Muslim Community in Canada;^{[B1]} (43°51′55″N 79°32′42″W)
Baitul Hamd		Ontario	Mississauga Toronto,	1999	AMJ	* Also serves as Jamia Ahmadiyya for North America which is due to change in early 2012 as the Jamia will switch to the Headquarters in Maple Ontario. The complex has one large hall, a cafeteria, a library, several offices for local and regional chapters of the community and of Jamia Ahmadiyya North America as well. The second floors includes many class rooms as well.^{[B1]}
Bait-ul Hanif Mosque		Ontario	Toronto		AMJ	* the oldest mosque of the Ahmadiyya Muslim Community in its eastern GTA and serves as the local mosque for the local chapter of Toronto East.^{[B1]}
Bait-ul Ehsaan Mosque		Ontario	Windsor		AMJ	a primary school building which includes a Gym, several class rooms and small school field in the back lot was bought by the Ahmadiyya Muslim Community. The mosque serves as the local Ahmadiyya Muslim chapter.^{[B1]}
Baitul Afiyat Mosque		Ontario	Scarborough Markham	2008	AMJ	*An old church was bought and turned to a mosque in November 2008. The property was first build in 1865 and is serving as a local mosque and gathering place for the Ahmadiyya Muslim local chapter of Scarborough and Markham. The center also serves as the regional center for the community in GTA East.
Bait-ul Noor Mosque		Ontario	Hamilton		AMJ	serves as the Mosque for the Local Ahmadiyya Muslim Chapters of Hamilton South and Hamilton North.
Brampton Mosque		Ontario	Brampton	2005	AMJ	*Foundation stone laid for Brampton Mosque in 2005. When completed, it will have a larger interior than that of Bait-ul Islam Mosque in Maple.^{[B1]}
Hadeeqa-e-Ahmad		Ontario	Bradford, Ontario		AMJ	*Ahmadiyya Muslim Center consists of a large detached house on 250 acres of land which was bought by the community to serve as a Jalsa facility and a Moosian Graveyard. The land is used to grow corn and carrots. An orchard of 900 trees grows apples, pears and cherries.^{[B1]}
Jamaat Center		Ontario	Cornwall	2005	AMJ	The center serves as a Prayer space and auxiliary function to the local Ahmadiyya Muslim Chapter of Cornwall.
Malton Prayer Centre		Ontario	Malton in Mississauga, Ontario.^{[B1]}	2007	AMJ	Serves as the local prayer center for over 150 families in Malton, and is widely used each week, there are two halls which can allocate a maximum of 120 people in hall one, and 80 people in hall two.
Ahmadiyya Muslim Mosque (Ahmadiyya Muslim Association)		Ontario	East Ottawa		AMJ	
Ahmadiyya Muslim Mosque Kanata (Ahmadiyya Muslim Association)		Ontario	West Ottawa		AMJ	
St Catharines Jamaat Centre		Ontario	St Catharines		AMJ	*Located just out in the eastern suburbs of the city in the Niagara region. The mosque is a converted detached house on a 4-acre plot which also has an apple and cherry orchard.
Al Nusrat Mosque		Quebec	Montreal		AMJ	*Located in the north center part of the Island of Montreal, the mosque was a former Banquet Hall facility and consists of three halls and a large commercial kitchen. The building has several shops on rent by the Jamaat which are due to change when their contracts are finished.^{[B1]}
Mission House		Quebec	Quebec City, Quebec	2008	AMJ	*Several Families have moved in the area since 2008; Maulana Isaac Fonsica Sahib serves as the local Imam.

=== United States ===
- The Ahmadiyya Muslim Community established itself here in 1920.^{[B1]} Official Website
- The first mosque in the nation's capital was established as the American Fazl Mosque. It served as the Headquarters of the Ahmadiyya Muslim Community from 1950 to 1994.
- Headquarters since 1994 is Baitur Rehman Mosque, Silver Spring, Maryland. (39°6′10″N 76°58′56″W)

Arizona

- Yousuf Mosque in Tucson.^{[B1]}
- The Phoenix Mosque in Phoenix^{[B1]}

California

- Darus Salam Mosque in Bay Point.^{[B1]}
- Baitul Hameed Mosque in Chino.^{[B1]}
- Baitus Salam Mosque in Hawthorne.^{[B1]}
- Bait-ul-Baseer Mosque in Milpitas (Silicon Valley).^{[B1]}

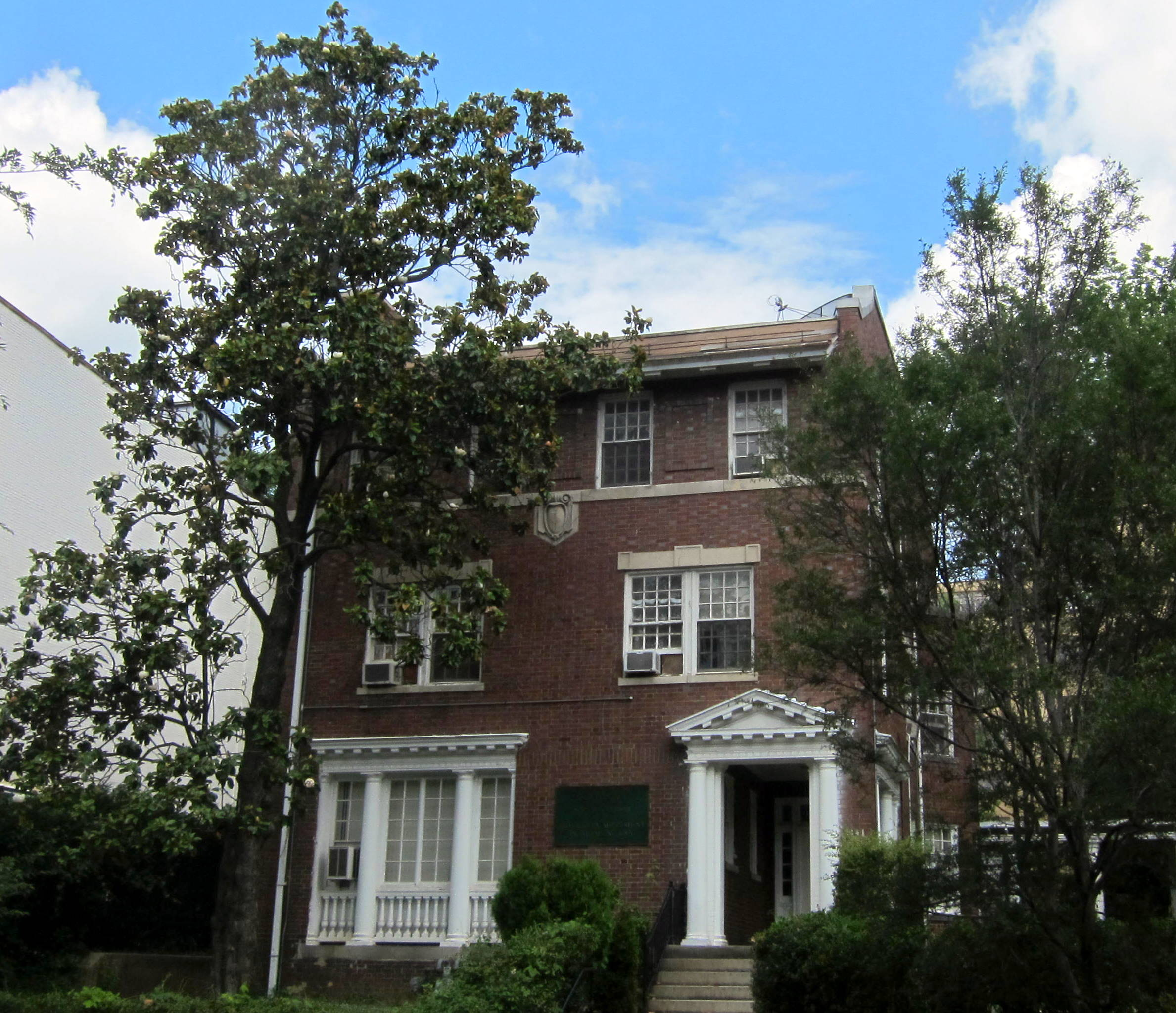
American Fazl Mosque in Washington, D.C.

Connecticut

- Baitul Aman Mosque.^{[B1]}
- The Hartford Mosque in Hartford.^{[B1]}

District of Columbia

- American Fazl Mosque in Washington, DC.^{[B1]}

Florida

- Bait-ul-Naseer Mosque in Miami.^{[B1]}
- Baitul-Aafiyat Mosque in Orlando, Florida^{[B1]}

Georgia

- Bait-ul-Baqi Mosque in Norcross.^{[B1]}

Illinois

- Al-Sadiq Mosque in Chicago which is the first mosque built in the US by the Ahmadiyya Muslim Community due to the missionary pioneering efforts of Mufti Muhammad Sadiq; thus the mosque was named after him ‘Sadiq’ (meaning ‘honest/truthful in all respects’ in Arabic).^{[B1]}
- Van Buren Mosque in Chicago.^{[B1]}
- Masjid Bait-ul-Jamey Mosque in Glen Ellyn.^{[B1]}
- Fath-e-Azeem Mosque and Mission House in Zion. (42°27′24″N 87°50′22″W)^{[B1]}

Louisiana

- Mission House in Kenner.^{[B1]}
- Mission House in New Orleans.^{[B1]}

Maryland

- Ahmadiyya Muslim Mission House in Baltimore.^{[B1]}
- Baitur Rehman Mosque, Silver Spring, Maryland, which serves as the National Headquarters of the Ahmadiyya Muslim Community USA.^{[B1]}

Massachusetts

- Mission House in Sharon (near Boston).^{[B1]}

Michigan

- Bait-ul-Muzaffar Mosque in Detroit.^{[B1]}
- Ahmadiyya Muslim Community Center in Rochester Hills.^{[B1]}

Missouri

- Sadiq Mosque in St. Louis which is under construction.^{[B1]}

New Jersey

- Bait-ul-Wahid Mosque in Clifton, New Jersey.^{[B1]}
- Bait-ul-Hadi Mosque in Old Bridge, New Jersey.^{[B1]}
- Bait-ul-Nasr Mosque in Willingboro, New Jersey.^{[B1]}

New York

- Bait-ul Huda Mosque in Amityville, New York.^{[B1]}
- Bait-ul Tahir Mosque in Brooklyn, New York.^{[B1]}
- Bait-ul Zafar Mosque in Queens, New York.^{[B1]}
- Baitun Naseer Mosque in Rochester, New York.^{[B1]}
- Ahmadiyya Muslim Mosque in Albany^{[B1]}
- Masjid Mahdi in Niagara Falls, New York.
- Masjid Bait-ul Majeed in Williamsville, New York.

North Carolina

- Ahmadiyya Muslim Mosque in Research Triangle, North Carolina.^{[B1]}

Ohio

- Bait-ul Ahad Mosque in Bedford, Ohio.^{[B1]}
- Fazal Mosque in Dayton, Ohio.^{[B1]}
- Bait-ul Nasir Mosque in Groveport, Ohio, constructed in 2007.^{[B1]}

Oregon

- Portland Rizwan Mosque in Portland, Oregon.^{[B1]}

Pennsylvania

- Nasir Mosque in Philadelphia, Pennsylvania.^{[B1]}
- Nur Mosque in Pittsburgh, Pennsylvania.^{[B1]}
- Mission House in Pittsburgh, Pennsylvania.^{[B1]}
- Noor Mosque in York, Pennsylvania.^{[B1]}
- Hadee Mosque in Harrisburg, Pennsylvania.

Texas

- Bait-ul Ikram Mosque in Allen, Texas.^{[B1]}
- Bait-us Samee Mosque in Houston, Texas, which is notably, the largest mosque in Texas.^{[B1]}
- Bait-ul Muqeet Mosque in Round Rock, Texas.^{[B1]}

Washington

- Bait-Ul-Ehsaan Mosque Monroe, WA.

Wisconsin

- Bait-ul-Qadir Mosque in Milwaukee, Wisconsin.^{[B1]}
- Qamar Mosque (established November 28, 2010) 300 North Eagle Street Oshkosh WI 54904Oshkosh, WI.^{[B1]}

== Caribbean ==
The Ahmadiyya Muslim Community was introduced to the Caribbean in the 1950s, beginning with its presence in the island nation of Trinidad and Tobago in 1952.

=== French Antilles ===
- The Ahmadiyya Muslim Community established itself here in 2002.^{[B1]}
- Guadeloupe Mission House in Guadeloupe^{[B1]}

=== Trinidad and Tobago ===
- The Ahmadiyya Muslim Community established itself here in 1952.^{[B1]}
- Baitul A’ala Mosque in Caratel^{[B1]}
- Rahim Mosque in McBean, Couva^{[B1]}
- Baitul Aziz Mosque in the northern region of Valencia^{[B1]}
- Ahmadiyya Anjuman Isha'at-e-Islam Inc. Trinidad and Tobago

== South America ==
The Ahmadiyya Muslim Community was introduced to South America in the 1950s, beginning with its presence in Guyana in 1956.^{[B1]} It is now on established in all of South America except for Paraguay, Uruguay, Chile, and Panama.^{[B1]}

=== Brazil ===
- The Ahmadiyya Muslim Community established itself here in 1986.^{[B1]}
- Baitul Awal Mosque in Petrópolis which is about 60 km from Rio de Janeiro^{[B1]}
- Brazil Mosque in Brasília^{[B1]}

=== Guatemala ===
- The Ahmadiyya Muslim Community established itself here in 1989.^{[B1]}
- Baitul Awal in Guatemala, inaugurated on July 3, 1989, in celebration of the centenary of the creation of the Ahmadiyya Muslim Community in 1889^{[B1]}

=== Guyana ===
- The Ahmadiyya Muslim Community established itself here in 1956.^{[B1]}
- Baitul Noor^{[B1]}

=== Suriname ===
- The Ahmadiyya Muslim Community established itself here in 1956.^{[B1]}
- Nasir Mosque in Paramaribo which is one of the largest mosques in Suriname, established in 1971.^{[B1]}
- Nasar Mosque established in 1984.^{[B1]}

== Oceania ==
The Ahmadiyya Muslim Community was introduced to Oceania in the 1903. Since then, it has expanded to several island nations such as Tuvalu, the Solomon Islands, Tonga, Vanuatu, Kiribati, Nauru, Micronesia, Guam, Palau, New Zealand, and Fiji.^{[B1]}

=== Australia ===
- Established in Australia in c. 1903^{[B1]}

In New South Wales

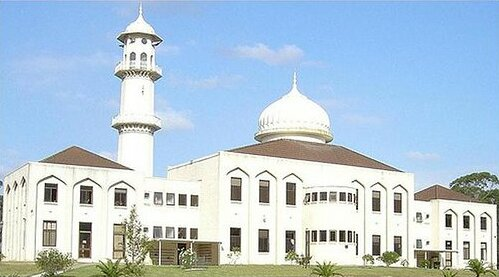
Baitul Huda in Sydney, Australia

- Baitul Huda Mosque in Sydney acts as the National Headquarters of the Ahmadiyya Muslim Community. It is one of the largest mosques in Australia. Completed in 1983, it was one of the first mosques to be built in the country^{[B1]}
  - Khilafat Centenary Hall, adjacent to the Baitul Huda Mosque.^{[B1]}
  - Hassan Musa Library, within Baitul Huda Mosque, named after the first Ahmadi convert from Australia, Sufi Hassan Musa Khan, who was also a companion of Mirza Ghulam Ahmad.^{[B1]}

In Queensland

- Baitul Masroor Mosque, Brisbane^{[B1]}

In South Australia

- Masjid Mahmood, Adelaide's CBD
- Gulshan-E-Masroor, Aldinga
- Masjid Noor, Morphett Vale, a former Uniting church

In Victoria

- Baitus Salam, Melbourne, one of the largest Ahmadiyya mosque in the world; it is a totally pillarless building completed in 2011. The building was purchased in 2006^{[B1]}

In 2024 a former headspace building was bought in Thomas St Dandenong which will be upgraded and used as a place of worship.

In Western Australia

- Nasir Mosque, Bibra Lake

=== Fiji ===
- Established in Fiji in 1960^{[B1]}

In Viti Levu

- Rizwan Mosque, Sugar City, Lautoka^{[B1]}
- Aqsa Mosque, Nadi^{[B1]}
- Mahmood Mosque, Maro^{[B1]}
- Fazle Umar Mosque, Suva, the largest mosque in the Fiji^{[B1]}

In Vanua Levu

- Aiwane Mustafa Lajna (Women's) Hall, Samabula^{[B1]}
- Noor Mosque, Seaqaqa

=== Marshall Islands ===
- Baet-Ul-Ahad Mosque, Majuro

=== New Zealand ===
- Established in New Zealand in 1987

- Baitul Muqeet Mosque, Manukau, Auckland
  - Opened a communal kitchen, Langar Khana of the Promised Messiah, in 2010

=== Tuvalu ===
- Established in Tuvalu in 1985

- Tuvalu Mosque, Funafuti

== See also ==
- 100-Mosque-Plan in Germany

== Bibliography ==
- B1.	Ahmadiyya Muslim mosques around the world: a pictorial presentation, Khilafat Centenary Edition. Silver Spring, Md: Ahmadiyya Muslim Community, USA. 2008. ISBN 978-1-882494-51-4.
