= Mahdi Mosque =

Mahdi Mosque may refer to:

- Al-Mahdi Mosque, Bradford, England
- Mahdi Mosque, Hurtigheim, France
- Mahdi Mosque, Jamaica
- Al-Mahdi Mosque, Sanaa, Yemen

== See also ==
- Mahdi
