= Fazl Mosque =

Fazl Mosque may refer to:

- Fazl Mosque, London
- Fazl Mosque, Washington, D.C.
