= 100-Mosques-Plan =

The 100-Mosques-Plan is the project of the Ahmadiyya Muslim Jamaat in Germany to build 100 new mosques. It was initiated by Mirza Tahir Ahmad, the Khalifatul Masih IV, during the centenary celebrations of the community in 1989. The project is completely financed by the Ahmadiyya Muslim Community, Germany, through collections from the members. The plans and the execution of the projects is also mostly performed by German Ahmadis voluntarily. Ahmadiyya Muslim Community has total of 52 mosques and 65 prayer centres in Germany.

== Mosques ==
	Mosque	City	State	Year	Comments	Photo
–	Fazl-e-Omar Mosque	Eimsbüttel	Hamburg	1957	Named after Second Caliph Mirza Basheer-ud-Din Mahmood Ahmad, built before 1989, foundation 22 February 1957, completed 22 June 1957, plot 1,500 m^{2} (16,000 sq ft), prayer hall 40 m^{2} (430 sq ft), two minarets at 8 m (26 ft) height 53°35′0.9″N 9°56′36.2″E (Note: Website Fazl-e-Omar Moschee)	
–	Nuur Mosque	Frankfurt	Hesse	1959	"Mosque of the (Godly) light", built before 1989, foundation 8 May 1957, completed 12 September 1959, plot 1,530 m^{2} (16,500 sq ft), prayer hall 120 m^{2} (1,300 sq ft), two minarets at 9 m (30 ft) height 50°05′8.8″N 8°41′47″E (Note: Website Nuur Moschee)	
1.	Bait-ul-Shakoor Mosque	Groß-Gerau	Hesse	1992	"House of the thankful", foundation 1989, completed 1992, at "Nasir Bagh", prayer rooms 600 m^{2} (6,500 sq ft), one minaret at 7 m (23 ft) height, two prayer halls49°56′31.5″N 8°29′52.2″E (Note: Website Bait-ul-Shakoor Moschee)	
2.	Hamd Mosque	Wittlich	Rhineland-Palatinate	1999	"Mosque of Praise (of God)“, foundation Nov 1998, completed Dec 1999, plot 3500 m^{2}, prayer hall 200 m^{2}, one minaret 10 m height, 600 capacity 49°58′28.2″N 6°56′47.5″E (Note: Website Hamd Moschee)	
3.	Basharat Mosque	Osnabrück	Lower Saxony	2002	"Mosque of good news“, foundation Oct 1999, completed Mar 2002, plot 2481 m^{2}, prayer hall 129 m^{2}, two minarets 10 m height 52°18′2.3″N 8°0′18.3″E (Note: Website Basharat Moschee)	
4.	Nuur-ud-Din Mosque	Darmstadt	Hesse	2003	"Mosque of the light of the religion“, named after first Caliph Hakeem Noor-ud-Din, foundation May 2002, completed Aug 2003, plot 2418 m^{2}, prayer hall 331 m^{2}, one minaret 17 m height, 450 members 49°53′6.7″N 8°37′15.5″E (Note: Website Nuur-ud-Din Moschee)	
5.	Bait-ul-Momin Mosque	Münster	North Rhine-Westphalia	2003	"House of the giver of peace“, foundation Aug 2000, completed May 2003, plot 1015 m^{2}, prayer hall 138 m^{2}, two minarets 10 m height 51°53′37.8″N 7°37′49.1″E (Note: Website Fazl-e-Omar Moschee)	
6.	Nasir Mosque	Stuhr	Lower Saxony	2004	Named after third Caliph Mirza Nasir Ahmad, foundation Nov 2001, completed May 2004, plot 5637 m^{2}, prayer hall 239 m^{2}, one minaret 12 m height 53°1′2.3″N 8°46′50.7″E (Note: Website Nasir Moschee)	
7.	Tahir mosque	Koblenz	Rhineland-Palatinate	2004	Named after fourth Caliph Mirza Tahir Ahmad, foundation Dec 2002, completed May 2004, plot 2182 m^{2}, prayer hall 338 m^{2}, two minarets 15 m height, 600 members 50°22′31.3″N 7°35′31.4″E (Note: Website Tahir Moschee)	
8.	Aziz Mosque	Riedstadt	Hesse	2004	"Mosque of the all-powerful“, foundation Nov 2003, completed Aug 2004, plot 1753 m^{2}, prayer hall 200 m^{2}, one minaret 14 m height 49°49′54.9″N 8°29′6.4″E (Note: Website Aziz Moschee)	
9.	Habib Mosque	Kiel	Schleswig-Holstein	2004	"Mosque of the Beloved“, foundation Nov 2003, completed Aug 2004, plot 1600 m^{2}, prayer hall 242 m^{2}, two minarets 13 m height, 300 members 54°18′5″N 10°7′44.5″E (Note: Website Habib Moschee)	
10.	Bait-ul-Huda Mosque	Usingen	Hesse	2004	"House of the Guidance“, foundation Mar 2004, completed Sep 2004, plot 1440 m^{2}, prayer hall 150 m^{2}, one minaret 15 m height 50°19′57.9″N 8°31′11.1″E (Note: Website Bait-ul-Huda Moschee)	
11.	Bait-ul-Aleem Mosque	Würzburg	Bavaria	2005	"House of the all-knowing“, 200 members, foundation Nov 2004, completed 24 Aug 2005, plot 2500 m^{2}, prayer hall 188 m^{2}, one minaret 15 m height 49°43′47.9″N 9°57′39.7″E (Note: Website Bait-ul-Aleem Moschee)	
12.	Bashier Mosque	Bensheim	Hesse	2006	Named after second Caliph Mirza Basheer-ud-Din Mahmood Ahmad, foundation Aug 2005, completed 23 Dec 2006, plot 1006 m^{2}, prayer hall 188 m^{2}, no minaret, 400 members 49°41′8″N 8°35′36.2″E (Note: Website Bashier Moschee)	
13.	Mahmud Mosque	Kassel	Hesse	2007	Foundation Aug 2005, completed 04 Sep 2007, plot 2959 m^{2}, prayer hall 209 m^{2}, no minaret 51°16′52.5″N 9°28′35.6″E (Note: Website Mahmud Moschee)	
14.	Bait-ul-Nasir Mosque	Isselburg	North Rhine-Westphalia	2007	Named after Mirza Nasir Ahmad, foundation Sep 2005, completed 07 Sep 2007, plot 2120 m^{2}, prayer hall 128 m^{2}, two minarets 10 m height, 100 members 51°50′20.3″N 6°28′7.6″E (Note: Website Bait-ul-Nasir Moschee)	
15.	Bait-ul-Jame Mosque	Offenbach am Main	Hesse	2007	"Home of the Gatherer“, foundation 24 Aug 2005, completed 16 Jan 2007, plot 1566 m^{2}, prayer hall 533 m^{2}, one minaret 16 m height 50°5′55.6″N 8°47′26″E (Note: Website Bait-ul-Jame Moschee)	
16.	Bait-ul-Muqiet Mosque	Wabern	Hesse	2007	"Mosque of the Sustainer“, foundation May 2005, completed 23 Nov 2007, plot 2956 m^{2}, one minaret 9 m height, 54 members, Mosque 330 m^{2}, prayer halls 2 * 70 m^{2} 51°5′59.6″N 9°21′22.7″E (Note: Website Bait-ul-Muqiet Moschee)	
17.	Sami Mosque	Hannover	Lower Saxony	2008	"House of the All-Hearing“, foundation Aug 2006, completed 16 Aug 2008, plot 2800 m^{2}, prayer hall 408 m^{2}, one minaret 16 m height, 300 members 52°25′47.4″N 9°39′28.9″E (Note: Website Sami Moschee)	
18.	Bait-ul-Karim Mosque	Stade	Lower Saxony	2008	"House of the Nobel“ first Mosque in Landkreis Stade, foundation 29 Mar 2008, completed 15 Aug 2008, plot 840 m^{2}, prayer hall 62 m^{2}, one minaret 10 m height 53°36′13″N 9°29′23.9″E (Note: Website Bait-ul-Karim Moschee)	
19.	Anwar Mosque	Rodgau	Hesse	2008	"Mosque of the lights“, foundation Dec 2006, completed 19 Aug 2008, plot 1034 m^{2}, prayer hall 218 m^{2}, one minaret 14 m height 50°1′30.4″N 8°53′48.4″E (Note: Website Anwar Moschee)	
20.	Qamar Mosque	Weil der Stadt	Baden-Württemberg	2008	"Moon-Mosque“, foundation Dec 2006, completed 21 Aug 08, plot 1145 m^{2}, prayer hall 128 m^{2}, no minaret, 289 m^{2} for 120 members, €500,000 48°45′24.2″N 8°52′26.3″E (Note: Website Qamar Moschee)	
21.	Khadija Mosque	Heinersdorf	Berlin	2008	Mosque named after Khadija bint Khuwaylid, first mosque in east Berlin, foundation 2 Jan 2007, completed 15 Oct 08, plot 4790 m^{2}, prayer hall 345 m^{2}, one minaret 12,90 m height, 200 members 52°34′20.6″N 13°25′49.8″E (Note: Website Khadija Moschee)	
22.	Ehsan Mosque	Mannheim	Baden-Württemberg	2010	"Mosque of the favour“, foundation 17 Dec 2008, completed 24/06/10, plot 1641 m^{2}, prayer hall 208 m^{2}, two minarets 12 m height, 450 members, 3 story mosque, €700,000 49°26′56.5″N 8°30′20.6″E (Note: Website Ehsan Moschee)	
23.	Bait-un-Nasr Mosque	Cologne	North Rhine-Westphalia	2011	"House of the Help“, Being used as center since 1985, was changed into a visible mosque on 23/06/11 by building a minaret. 50°58′28.9″N 6°57′55.6″E (Note: Website Bait un-Nasr)	
24.	Bait-ul-Afiyat Mosque	Lübeck	Schleswig-Holstein	2011	"House of security“, foundation 21 Aug 2009, completed 13/06/11, plot 1934 m^{2}, prayer hall 128 m^{2}, one minaret 11 m height, 160 members; about 500 000 Euro first new mosque building in Lübeck 53°50′53.4″N 10°40′47.6″E (Note: Website Bait-ul-Afiyat Moschee)	
25.	Bait-ul-Ghafur Mosque	Ginsheim-Gustavsburg	Hesse	2011	"House of the All-Forgiving“, foundation 02/2009, completed 18/06/2011, plot 2725 m^{2}, prayer hall 352 m^{2}, one minaret 12 m height, cost about 1.2 Mio. Euro; 607 capacity for 350 members 49°59′22.5″N 8°19′54.1″E (Note: Website Bait-ul-Ghafur Moschee)	
26.	Bait-ul-Hadi Mosque	Seligenstadt	Hesse	2011	"House of the Guide“, foundation 8 Apr 2011, completed 19 Jun 2011, plot 1574 m^{2}, prayer hall 313 m^{2}, one minaret 13 m height, 200 capacity for 150 members, €300,000, Mosque was built in 3 months using module based manufacturing. 50°3′18.1″N 8°57′48.3″E (Note: Website Bait-ul-Hadi Moschee)	
27.	Bait-ul-Aman Mosque	Nidda	Hesse	2011	"House of Peace“, foundation Dec 2008, completed 20 Jun 2011, plot 2189 m^{2}, prayer hall 301 m^{2}, two minarets 8 m height 50°24′22.4″N 9°0′38.7″E (Note: Website Bait-ul-Aman Moschee)	
28.	Bait-ul-Baqi Mosque	Dietzenbach	Hesse	2011	"House of the Rest“ Bought 1993, foundation Dec 2009, completed 21 Jun 2011, plot 1500 m^{2}, prayer hall 318 m^{2}, one minaret 9 m height, bought for €510,000 and converted for €200,000 in a mosque. 50°1′13.7″N 8°47′22.5″E (Note: Website Bait-ul-Baqi Moschee)	
29.	Bait-ul-Ahad Mosque	Limburg an der Lahn	Hesse	2012	"House of the One“. 200 members, foundation 7 Oct 2011, completed 27 May 2012, 9 m high minaret, Mosque was built in modular technique for €320,00050°23′50.6″N 8°3′52.4″E (Note: Website Bait-ul-Ahad Moschee)	
30.	Bait-ur-Rasheed Mosque	Schnelsen	Hamburg	2012	"House of the Rightly Guided“. 2300 members, metal factory bought in 1993. Renovated and two 14 m high minarets were built. 53°38′3″N 9°54′17″E (Note: Website Bait-ur-Rasheed Moschee)	
31.	Bait-ul-Ahad Mosque	Bruchsal	Baden-Württemberg	2012	"House of the One“, plot bought in 2010, foundation 20. Sep 2011. Completed 12 Dec 2012 49°7′12.9″N 8°34′58.7″E (Note: Website Bait-ul-Ahad Moschee)	
32.	Bait-ul-Baqi	Pforzheim	Baden-Württemberg	2012	"House of the ???“, foundation 16 Dec 2009, minaret 10 m; costs €750,000, capacity for 150 members, completed on 12 Dec 2012, 48°54′2.5″N 8°39′26″E (Note: Website Bait-ul-Baqi Moschee)	
33.	Ata Mosque	Flörsheim am Main	Hesse	2013	"Gift Mosque“. The Penny super market in the Altkönigstraße was closed in 2010. It was converted to a mosque since Oct. 2012. 128 members from Flörsheim and Hochheim. completed on 26 Jun 2013. 50°0′57.4″N 8°25′48.8″E	
34.	Bait-ur-Raheem Mosque	Neuwied	Rhineland-Palatinate	2013	"House of the Merciful“, foundation 7 Nov 2009, completed on 25 Jun 2013, 2500 m^{2} for 130 members. two prayer halls 70 m^{2} and a 10 m high minaret, costs €500,000, first mosque in Neuwied. 50°26′0.6″N 7°28′20.2″E (Note: Website Bait-ur-Raheem Moschee)	
35.	Dar-ul-Amaan Mosque	Friedberg	Hesse	2014	"House of Peace“. 300 members, plot 2000 m^{2}, foundation 29. May 2012, completed on 7 Jun 2014. 50°19′23″N 8°44′33.2″E (Note: Website Dar-ul-Amaan Moschee)	
36.	Al-Mahdi Mosque	Neufahrn bei Freising	Bavaria	2014	"House of the Mahdi“. ? plot ??? m^{2}, completed on 9 Jun 2014. Conversion of a house into a mosque. 48°19′21.3″N 11°39′35.7″E (Note: Website Al-Mahdi Moschee)	
37.	Mansoor Mosque	Aachen	North Rhine-Westphalia	2015	"Named after Mirza Mansoor Ahmad“. plot 300 m^{2}, 170 members, 14 m minaret, costs €450,000, foundation 5 Jun 2012 completed on 23 May 2015.50°47′28″N 6°6′50.8″E (Note: Website Mansoor Moschee)	
38.	Bait-ul-Wahid Mosque	Hanau	Hesse	2015	"House of the One (God)“, completed 27 May 2015.50°7′25″N 8°55′0″E (Note: Website Bait-ul-Wahid Moschee)	38. Bait ul-Wahid Moschee, Hanau
39.	Bait-ul-Qaadir Mosque	Vechta	Lower Saxony	2015	"House of the Omnipotent“, plot bought in 2010, 120 members, plot 2000 m^{2}, foundation 11. Oct. 2011, completed on 9 Jun 2015.52°45′6″N 8°16′39.2″E (Note: Website Bait-ul-Qaadir Moschee)	
40.	Subhan Mosque	Mörfelden-Walldorf	Hesse	2016	1600 m^{2} plot for 500,000 Euro. 16 m minaret. Foundation 24 Jun 2013. Completed on 9 Jul 2014. 49°59′14.8″N 8°34′38″E (Note: Website Subhan Moschee)	
41.	Salam Mosque	Iserlohn	North Rhine-Westphalia	2016	70 members, prayer hall 110 m^{2}, minaret 12 m, completed on 9 Oct 2016. 51°24′26″N 7°41′34″E (Note: Website Salam Moschee)	46. Salam-Moschee, Iserlohn
42.	Afiyat Mosque	Waldshut-Tiengen	Baden-Württemberg	2017	"House of the ?“, foundation ?, completed 10/04/2017, plot ? m^{2}, prayer hall ? m^{2}, two minarets ? m 47°37′52.1″N 8°15′56.4″E (Note: Website Afiyat Moschee)	
43.	Bait-un-Naseer Mosque	Augsburg	Bavaria	2017	"House of the Helper“, foundation 20 Nov 2009, completed on 11 Apr 2017. capacity for 140 members €600,000 48°23′40.8″N 10°52′53.2″E (Note: Website Bait-un-Naseer Moschee)	
44.	Bait-us-Samad Mosque	Giessen	Hesse	2017	"House of the Independent“ foundation 28. May 2012, completed on 21 Aug 2017. 50°35′49.5″N 8°41′0″E (Note: Website Bait-us-Samad Moschee)	
45.	Bait-ul-Hamid Mosque	Fulda	Hesse	2019	350 members, 4.500 m^{2} plot for 350,000 Euro, 15 m high minaret. foundation 26 Jun 2013 completed on 20 Oct 2019.50°32′24.4″N 9°41′14.7″E (Note: Website Bait-ul-Hamid Moschee)	
46.	Bait-ul-Baseer Mosque	Nahe	Schleswig-Holstein	2019	"House of the All-Seeing“ in Mahdi Abad, plot 176.479 m^{2} bought in Jun 1989, foundation 14 Jun 2011, completed on 25 Oct 2019. 53°47′49.5″N 10°8′17.1″E (Note: Website Bait-ul-Baseer Moschee)	
47.	Mubarak Mosque	Wiesbaden	Hesse	2019	"House of the ?“, foundation 04/06/2014, completed 14/10/2019, plot ? m^{2}, prayer hall ? m^{2}, ? minaret ? m 850 members 50°4′27.3″N 8°12′21.7″E (Note: Website Mubarak Moschee)	
48.	Sadiq Mosque	Karben	Hesse	Under construction	Foundation 07 Jun 2014 50°14′44.2″N 8°44′57.1″E (Note: Website Sadiq Moschee)	
49.	Bait-ur-Rehman Mosque	Nuremberg	Bavaria	Under construction	"House of the Gracious“, foundation ?, completed ?, plot ? m^{2}, prayer hall ? m^{2}, ? minaret ? m 49°25′11.5″N 11°4′52.5″E (Note: Website Bait-ur-Rehman Moschee)	
50.	N. N.	Erfurt	Thuringia	Under construction	Foundation 13 Nov 2018 (Note: Website Moschee-Neubau)	
	N. N.	Leipzig	Sachsen	In planning		
	N. N.	Mainz-Hechtsheim	Rhineland-Palatinate	Planned	Capacity for 200 members, 49°57′37″N 8°15′13″E	
	N. N.	Pinneberg	Schleswig-Holstein	Planned	Capacity for 940 members“	
	N. N.	Dreieich	Hesse	Planned	550 m^{2} for 250 members, 400,000 €, 50°0′47.5″N 8°41′24.5″E	
	N. N.	Stuttgart	Baden-Württemberg	Planned	Not sold 48°50′15″N 9°9′30″E	
	N. N.	Heidelberg	Baden-Württemberg	Planned		
	N. N.	Hochheim	Hesse	Planned		
	N. N.	Betzdorf-Alsdorf	Rhineland-Palatinate	Planned	50 members	
	N. N.	Schwalmtal	North Rhine-Westphalia	Planned	For the area Mönchengladbach and Viersen	
	N. N.	Bad Homburg	Hesse	Planned	50°13′0″N 8°36′25″E	
	N. N.	Nürnberg	Bavaria	Planned	plot 800 m^{2}, 13 m minaret, 100 members 49°25′15″N 11°4′30″E	
	N. N.	Marburg	Hesse	Planned	Search for a plot	

Other projects

	Mosque	City	State	Year	Comments	Photo
–	Bait ul-Malik	Berlin-Reinickendorf	Berlin	1988	52°33′50″N 13°19′3″E	
–	Bait us-Salam	Freinsheim	Rhineland-Palatinate	1993	"House of peace“ 49°30′21″N 8°12′40″E	
–	Bait us-Sabuh	Frankfurt-Bonames	Rhineland-Palatinate	2000	"House of the Holy“ 50°11′30.6″N 8°39′28.2″E	
