= Fazl Mosque, Washington, D.C. =

Mosque in Washington, D.C., United States

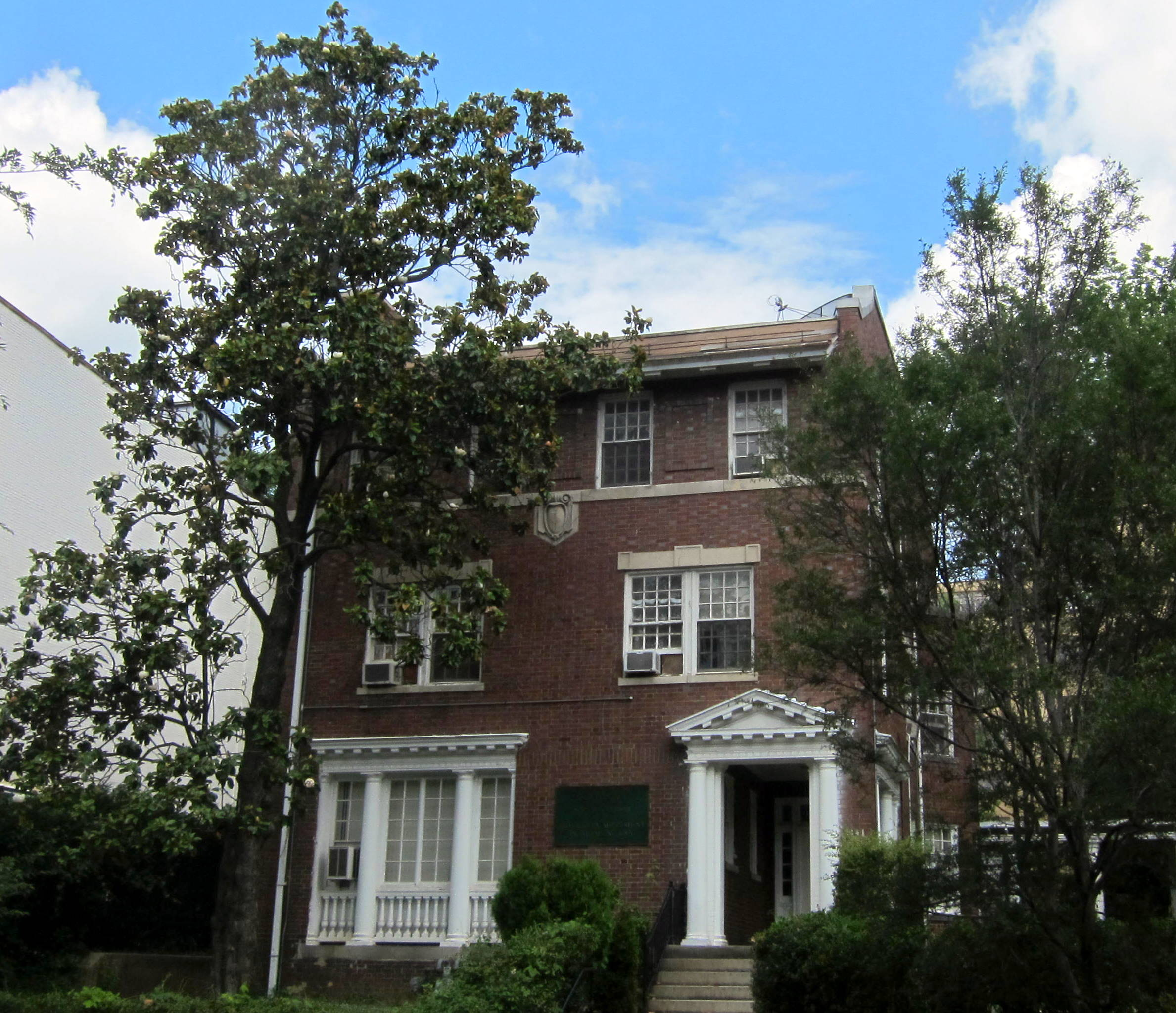

Religion
- Affiliation: Islam
- Branch/tradition: Ahmadiyya

Location
- Location: 2141 Leroy Place, NW Washington, D.C., 20008; United States
- Interactive map of Fazl Mosque, Washington, D.C.
- Coordinates: 38.915°N 77.048°W

Architecture
- Type: Mosque

Website
- www.ahmadiyya.us

The Fazl Mosque in Washington, D.C. was established by the Ahmadiyya Muslim Community in 1950 and is the first mosque in the U.S. capital of Washington, D.C. Its full title is the American Fazl Mosque, which helps to distinguish it from its sister mosque, the Fazl Mosque, London, both of which were the first mosques in the capitals of the U.S. and the U.K., respectively. Located a few minutes from the White House, and neighboring several embassies, Fazl Mosque opened seven years prior to the Islamic Center of Washington and is the longest serving mosque in the nation's capital.

Sir Zafrullah Khan, who in addition to serving as president of the United Nations General Assembly and President of the International Court of Justice at the Hague, was a companion of Mirza Ghulam Ahmad (1835–1908), as well as a notable scholar of Islam. The mosque served as the headquarters of the Ahmadiyya movement in the United States from 1950 until 1994, when it was moved to Baitur Rehman Mosque in Silver Spring, Maryland.

The American Fazl Mosque was built as a private residence in 1912. The Colonial Revival-style building is designated as a contributing property to the Sheridan-Kalorama Historic District, listed on the National Register of Historic Places.

== See also ==
- Ahmadiyya
- Ahmadiyya in the United States
- List of Ahmadiyya buildings and structures
- List of mosques in the Americas
- List of mosques in the United States
- Lists of mosques
