= Baitul Awal Mosque =

Mosque in Tirana City, Tirana County, Albania

- Xhamia Bejtyl Evel
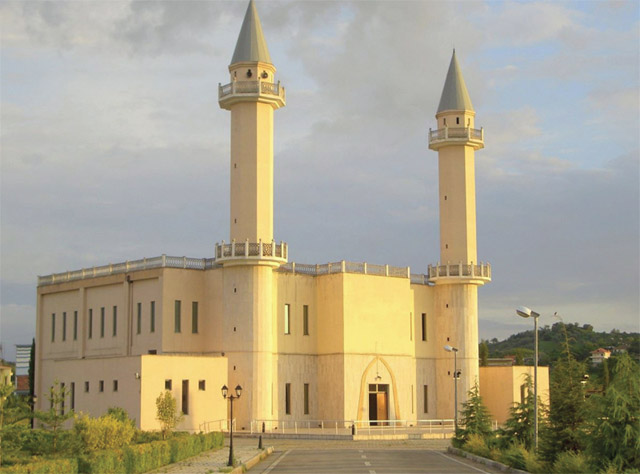
- The mosque, in 2009

- Location of the mosque in Albania

Religion
- Affiliation: Ahmadiyya
- Ecclesiastical or organizational status: Mosque
- Status: Active

Location
- Location: Tirana, Tirana County, Central Albania
- Country: Albania
- Interactive map of Baitul Awal Mosque
- Administration: Ahmadiyya Muslim Community
- Coordinates: 41°20′41″N 19°45′51″E

Architecture
- Type: Islamic architecture
- Completed: 1995

Specifications
- Capacity: 2,500 worshipers
- Minaret: 2

Website
- ahmadiyya-islam.org/al/

The Baitul Awal Mosque (Albanian: Xhamia Bejtyl-Evel), also spelled as the Bejtul-Evel Mosque, is an Ahmadiyya mosque, located in Tirana, Tirana County, in Central Albania. With a capacity of 2,500 worshippers, it is one of the largest mosques in the country.

== Overview ==
The Ahmadiyya Muslim Community in Albania was established in 1934. The mosque was financed by the members of Ahmadiyya Muslim Community and was inaugurated in 1995 by Mirza Tahir Ahmad, the fourth head of worldwide Ahmadiyya Muslim Community. The mosque was the first Ahmadiyya mosque built in Albania. The mosque has two white minarets.

Adjacent to the mosque is the ‘Darul Falah’ mission house.

== See also ==
- Islam in Albania
- List of mosques in Albania
- List of Ahmadiyya mosques
