= Fazl-e-Omar Mosque =

Mosque in Hamburg, Germany

- Fazle-Omar-Moschee
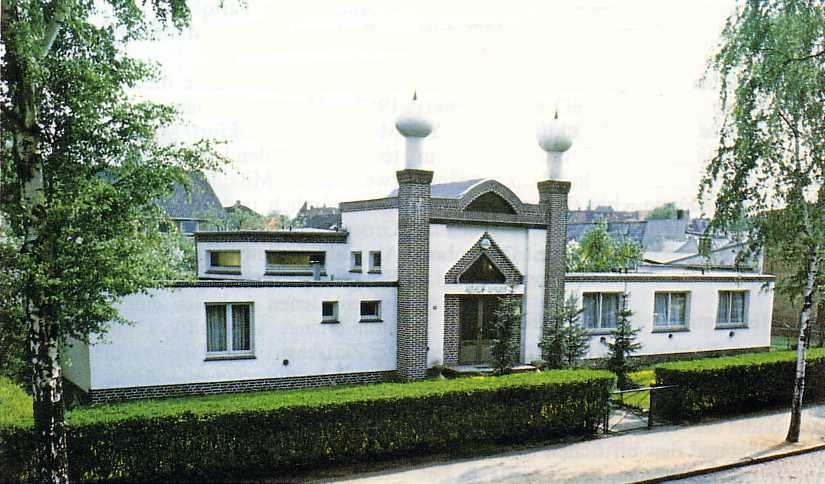

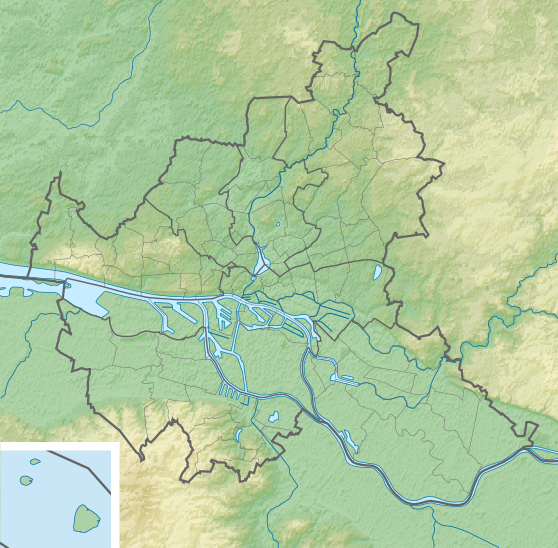
- Location within Hamburg

Religion
- Affiliation: Ahmadiyya Islam
- Ecclesiastical or organizational status: Mosque
- Governing body: Ahmadiyya Muslim Jamaat Deutschland K.d.ö.R.
- Status: Active

Location
- Location: Stellingen, Eimsbüttel, Hamburg
- Country: Germany
- Interactive map of Fazl-e-Omar Mosque
- Coordinates: 53°35′1″N 9°56′36″E

Architecture
- Type: Mosque
- Completed: 1957

Specifications
- Minaret: 2
- Minaret height: 8 m (26 ft)
- Site area: 1,500 m^{2} (16,000 sq ft)

Website
- ahmadiyya.de/gebetsstaette/moscheen/hamburg/

The Fazl-e-Omar Mosque (German: Fazle-Omar-Moschee) is a mosque in the Stellingen quarter of the Eimsbüttel borough of Hamburg, Germany.

== History ==
The foundation stone was laid on February 22, 1957. It is the first Ahmadiyya mosque in Germany and the first completed mosque after World War II, and the second purpose-built mosque in the country. The mosque is named in honour of the Second Caliph Mirza Basheer-ud-Din Mahmood Ahmad and is located on the street of Wieckstraße. It is run by the Ahmadiyya Muslim Jamaat Deutschland K.d.ö.R. (AMJ) and was inaugurated on July 22, 1957, by Sir Muhammad Zafarullah Khan.

== See also ==
- Ahmadiyya in Germany
- Islam in Germany
- List of mosques in Germany
- List of Ahmadiyya buildings and structures in Germany
