= Mahdi Mosque, Hurtigheim =

Mosque in Hurtigheim, France

Mahdi Mosque
- Mosquée Mahdi
- Location of the mosque in the Grand Est

Religion
- Affiliation: Ahmadiyya Islam
- Ecclesiastical or organizational status: Mosque
- Status: Active

Location
- Location: 2 Route des Romains, Hurtigheim, Grand Est
- Country: France
- Interactive map of Mahdi Mosque
- Coordinates: 48°37′04″N 7°36′01″E

Architecture
- Type: Mosque
- Completed: 2019
- Construction cost: c. €530,000

Specifications
- Capacity: 250 worshipers
- Interior area: 2,640 m^{2} (28,400 sq ft)
- Minaret: 1

The Mahdi Mosque (French: Mosquée Mahdi; Arabic: مسجد المهدي; Urdu: مسجد مہدی) is an Ahmadiyya mosque located in the village of Hurtigheim, near Strasbourg, in the Grand Est region of northeastern France.

== Overview ==
The mosque was inaugurated on 11 October 2019 and is the first purpose-built mosque in Kochersberg. Construction of the mosque took approximately three years and cost c. €530,000. The mosque was inaugurated by the Head of the Ahmadiyya Muslim Community, Mirza Masroor Ahmad. A formal reception was held on 12 October 2019 with dignitaries such as the mayor of Hurtigheim, and several members of the council such as the district council chairman, as well as the vice president.

The 2,640-square-metre (28,400 sq ft) mosque has capacity of 250 worshipers and includes a multi-purpose hall, some offices and a guest house, along with a car-park.

Several inter-faith events have been hosted at the mosque, such as a friendly iftar during Ramadan. In June 2022, the community held a "Mosque Open Day" with different stalls and exhibitions about Ahmadiyya.

== See also ==
- Islam in France
- List of Ahmadiyya buildings and structures
- List of mosques in France
