= Nuur-ud-Din Mosque =

Mosque in Darmstadt, Germany

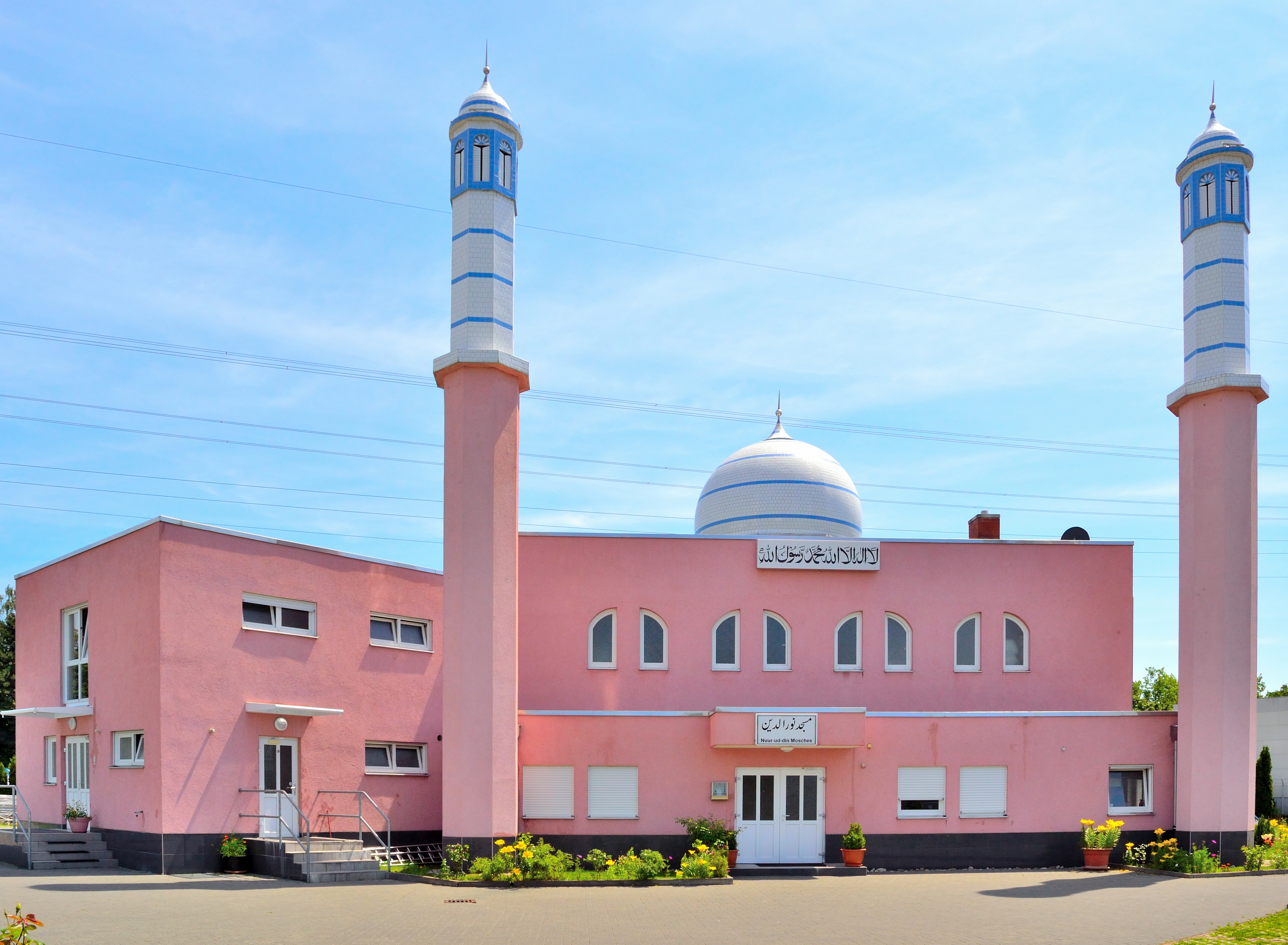

- Location within Hesse

Religion
- Affiliation: Ahmadiyya Islam
- Ecclesiastical or organizational status: Mosque
- Governing body: Ahmadiyya Muslim Jamaat Deutschland K.d.ö.R.
- Status: Active

Location
- Location: Haasstraße 1a, 64293 Darmstadt, Hesse
- Country: Germany
- Interactive map of Nuur-ud-Din Mosque
- Coordinates: 49°53′07″N 8°37′15″E

Architecture
- Type: Mosque
- Style: Contemporary
- Groundbreaking: May 2002
- Completed: 2003

Specifications
- Capacity: 500 worshippers
- Interior area: 331 m^{2} (3,560 sq ft)
- Dome: 1
- Minaret: 2
- Minaret height: 17 m (56 ft)
- Site area: 2,418 m^{2} (26,030 sq ft)

Website
- nuuruddin-moschee.de (in German)

The Nuur-ud-Din Mosque (English: Mosque of the Light of Religion) is a mosque in Darmstadt, in the state of Hesse, Germany.

The foundation stone was laid in May 2002 and was inaugurated in August 2003 by 5th Caliph of the Messiah, Mirza Masroor Ahmad. The mosque is named in honour of the 1st Caliph of the Messiah, Hakeem Noor-ud-Din. The mosque is administered by the Ahmadiyya Muslim Jamaat Deutschland K.d.ö.R. (AMJ).

== See also ==
- Ahmadiyya in Germany
- Islam in Germany
- List of mosques in Germany
- List of Ahmadiyya buildings and structures in Germany
