= Baitur Rehman Mosque =

Mosque in Silver Spring, Maryland, US

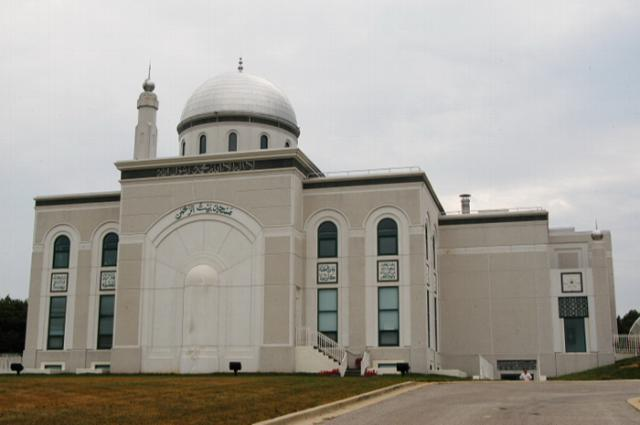

Religion
- Affiliation: Ahmadiyya

Location
- Location: Silver Spring, Maryland, United States
- Interactive map of Baitur Rehman Mosque
- Coordinates: 39.1033°N 76.9821°W

Architecture
- Type: Mosque
- Style: Modern
- Construction cost: $ 4.25 million

Specifications
- Dome: 1
- Minaret: 1

Baitur Rehman Mosque (House of the Gracious) is located in Silver Spring, Maryland in the United States. The mosque was inaugurated by Mirza Tahir Ahmad, the late head of the Ahmadiyya Muslim Community, on October 14, 1994. The mosque is run by the Ahmadiyya Muslim Community. An estimated 5,000 Ahmadis and guests from across the United States attended the opening ceremony.

== See also ==
- Islam in Maryland
- List of mosques in the United States
- Ahmadiyya
- Ahmadiyya in the United States
- List of Ahmadiyya Muslim Community buildings and structures
