= Darul Amaan Mosque =

Mosque in Hulme, Manchester, England

- مسجد دار الامان
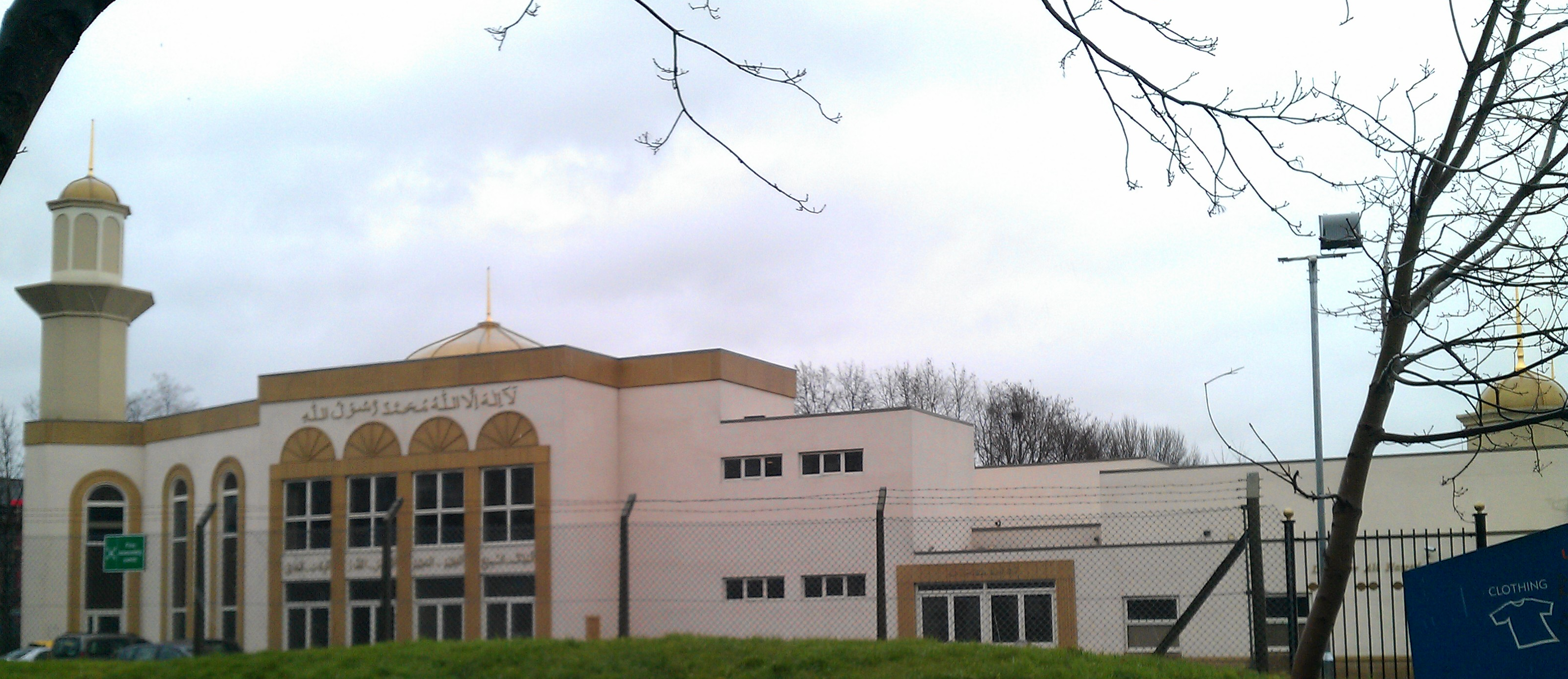

Religion
- Affiliation: Islam
- Branch/tradition: Ahmadiyya

Location
- Location: Hulme, Manchester
- Interactive map of Darul Amaan Mosque
- Coordinates: 53°27′43″N 2°14′22″W

Architecture
- Type: Mosque
- Style: Modern
- Completed: 27th April 2012
- Construction cost: £1.2 million

Specifications
- Capacity: 1300 (prayer halls); 2000 (Total)
- Dome: 3
- Minaret: 1

Website
- Ahmadiyya UK

The Darul Amaan Mosque is a purpose-built mosque in Manchester, England. Located in Hulme, immediately south of Manchester city centre, the mosque is only a walking distance from the University of Manchester's South Campus. The mosque was built in 2012, at a cost of over £1 million.

== History ==
The land upon which the mosque is built on was acquired by the community in 1991.

=== Inauguration ===
The mosque was inaugurated on 27 April 2012 by Mirza Masroor Ahmad, the caliph of the Ahmadiyya Muslim Community with the unveiling of the plaque, along with a grand inauguration session with over 1,500 guests and dignitaries.

== Architecture ==
The mosque is decorated with a gold-white theme. On the outside, the Shahada as well as some of the attributes of God have been engraved.

The mosque consists of three golden-themed domes. A big, central dome in the middle of the Mosque, under which the verse from Surah Ar-Ra'd is written in Arabic: أَلَا بِـذِكْـرِ اللهِ تَـطْـمَـئِـنُّ الْقُـلُـوْبُ, romanized: 'alā biḏikri-llāhi taṭma'innu l-qulūbu, meaning "It is only in the remembrance of Allah that hearts can find comfort", where the additional two domes or located on the corners of the right side of the mosque.

Alongside the domes, a smaller minaret is located on the left hand side of the mosque.

== Facilities ==
The mosque consists of two large prayers halls for men and women, which combined can accommodate around 1300 worshippers. Alongside this, the mosque complex consists of other areas used by the members of the community, such as:

- Two multi-purpose halls
- Offices
- Library
- Kitchen
- Guest Rooms

== Gallery ==
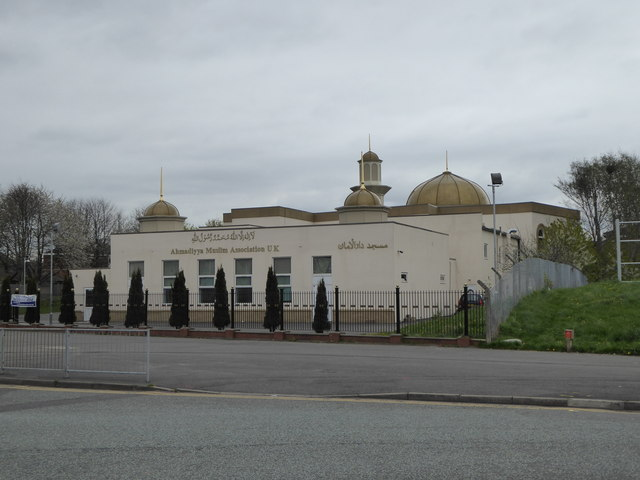
Mosque on Greenheys Lane, Hulme

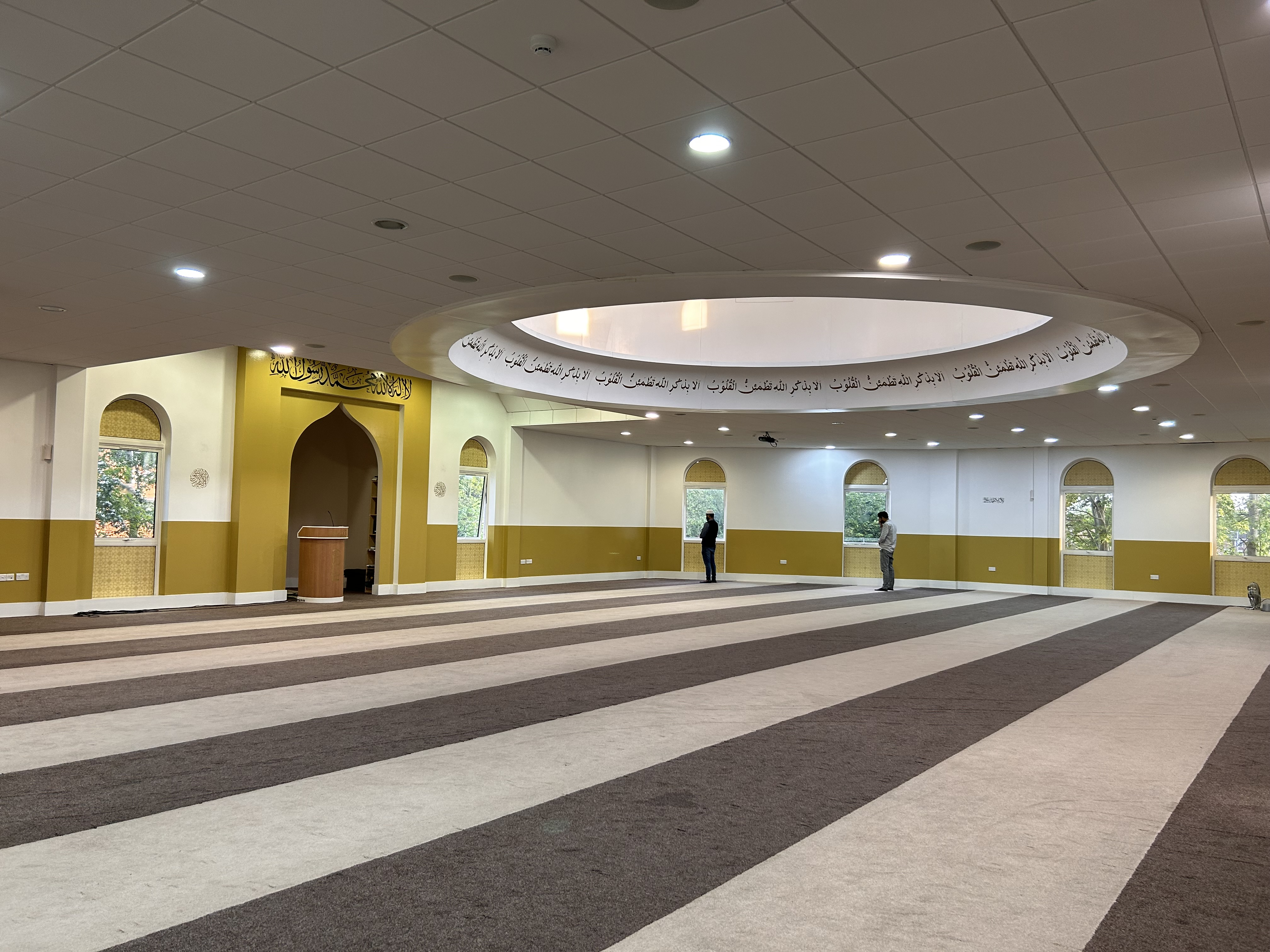
The men's prayer hall in the mosque

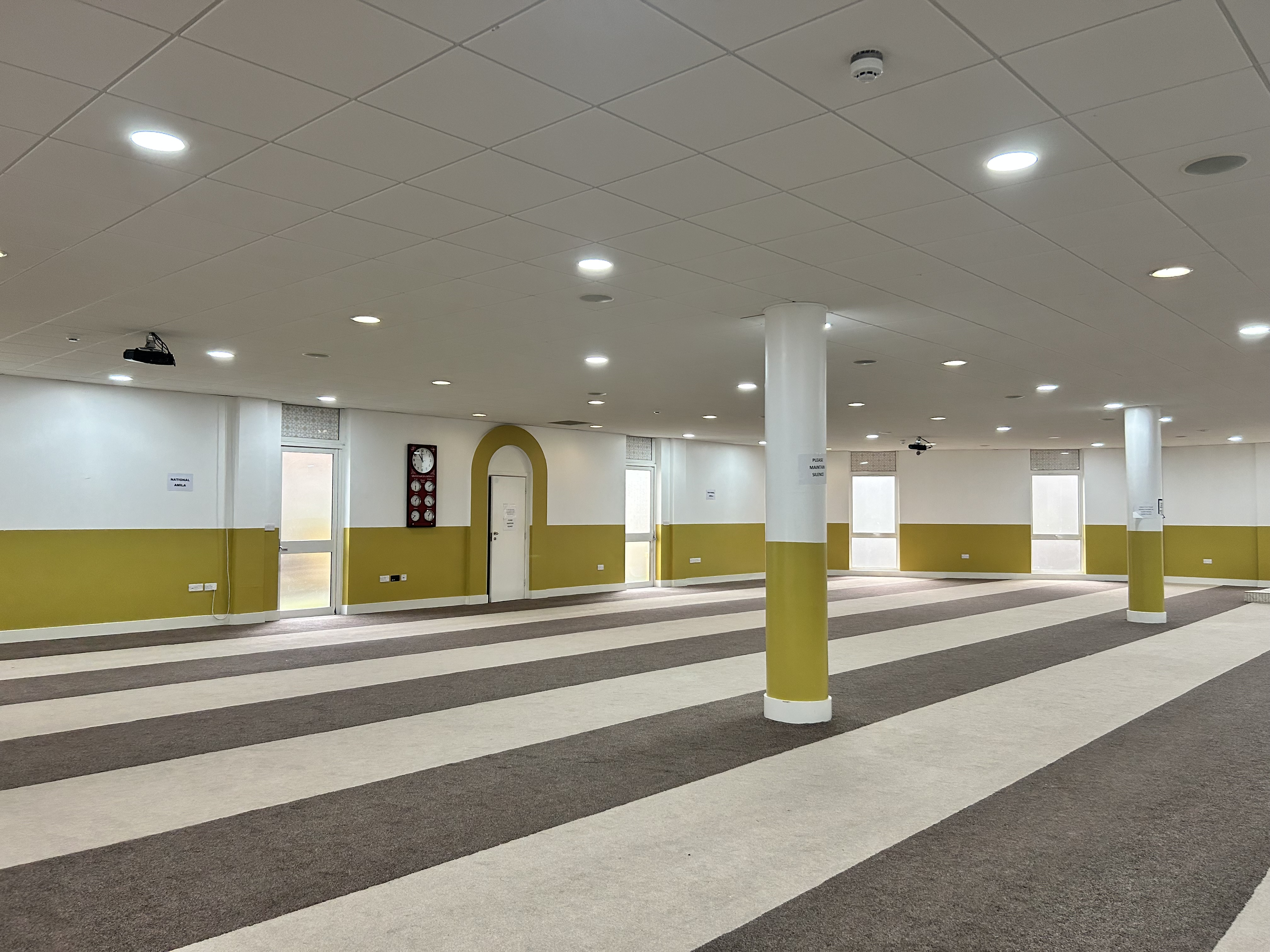
The women's prayer hall in the mosque

== See also ==
- Al Mahdi Mosque, Bradford
- Islam in England
- Ahmadiyya in the United Kingdom
