= List of mosques in Germany =

This is a list of mosques in Germany by states.

According to the Bundestag researchers, Germany had "at least 2,350 to 2,750 mosque congregations or associations". The Central Council of Muslims in Germany announced in early October that there are roughly 2,500 mosques.

== Baden-Württemberg ==
Name	Images	City	Year	Group	Remarks
Schwetzinger Garden Mosque		Schwetzingen	1796	U	Oldest mosque architecture in Germany. Non-functional as a mosque
Fatih Masjid		Heilbronn	1987	IGMG	
Yavuz Sultan Selim Mosque		Mannheim-Jungbusch	1995	DITIB	Capacity: 2,500 worshippers
Alperenler Masjid		Rheinfelden (Baden)	1996	DITIB	
Mevlana Masjid		Eppingen	1996	IGMG	
Große Moschee		Buggingen	1998	DITIB	
Mimar Sinan Masjid Mosbach		Mosbach	1990s	DITIB	
Central Masjid Offenburg		Offenburg	2002	DITIB	
Ehsaan Mosque		Mannheim	2010	AMJ	Capacity of 450 worshippers
Bait-ul-Ahad Mosque		Bruchsal	2012	AMJ	Eisenbahnstraße 8, 76646 Bruchsal
Baitul Afiyat Mosque		Waldshut-Tiengen	2017	AMJ	

== Bavaria ==
Name	Images	City	Year	Group	Remarks
Freimann Masjid		Munich-Freimann	1973	IZM	Foundation stone laid on 6 October 1967
Mosque in Sendling		Munich-Sendling	1989	DİTİB	A new mosque has been planned since 2004. However, it has faced community opposition
Penzberg Islamic Forum		Penzberg	2005	U	
DİTİB Kocatepe Mosque		Ingolstadt	2008	DİTİB	Capacity for 800 worshippers, with an adjacent cultural center
Selimiye Mosque		Deggendorf	2016	DİTİB	Capacity for 300 worshippers; after completion the mosque's minaret was shortened as it exceeded the maximum height by 2 m (6 ft 7 in)
Bait-un-Naseer Mosque		Augsburg		AMJ	Donauwörther Straße 165, 86154 Augsburg

== Berlin ==
Name	Images	City	Year	Group	Remarks
Wünsdorf Mosque (German: Wilmersdorfer Moschee)		Berlin-Wilmersdorf	1915	U	The oldest standing mosque in Germany—the Wünsdorf Mosque, built in 1915 at the Halbmondlager POW camp, was Germany's first, but it was demolished in 1925–26.
Berlin Mosque; German: Wilmersdorfer Moschee)		Berlin-Wilmersdorf	1925	AAIIL	Two 27 m-tall (90 ft) minarets with onion-like domes flank the mosque; damaged in World War II and subsequently restored
Şehitlik Mosque		Berlin-Neukölln	2004	DİTİB	Designed in an Ottoman Revival style by Hilmi Şenalp, the mosque has capacity for 1,500 worshippers
Omar Ibn Al-Khattab Mosque		Berlin-Kreuzberg	2008	U	
Khadija Mosque		Berlin-Heinersdorf	2008	AMJ	The first mosque in former East Germany
Ibn Rushd-Goethe Mosque		Alt-Moabit, Mitte	2017	Lib	Founded by Seyran Ateş, it is the first liberal mosque in the world. Burqa and niqāb are banned; men and women pray together; women aren't forced to wear a headscarf; LGBT Muslims are welcome.
House of One		Fischerinsel	under construction (as of June 2024)		Ecumenical religious structure containing a church, a mosque, and a synagogue, colloquially, the building is called a churmosqagogue.
Fussilet Mosque		Friedrich-Krause-Ufer			Fussilet 33 e.V.

== Bremen ==
Name	Images	City	Year	Group	Remarks
Fatih Mosque		Bremen-Gröpelingen	1999	IGMG	Capacity: 1.300

== Hamburg ==
Name	Images	City	Year	Group	Remarks
Fazl-e-Omar Mosque		Hamburg-Lokstedt	1957	AMJ	First mosque built after World War II in Germany
Imam Ali Mosque		Hamburg-Uhlenhorst	1966	Sh	Built by Iranian businessmen; forcibly closed in 2024 by order of the Federal Ministry of the Interior and the Homeland, and subject to appeal.
Hamburg Central Mosque		Hamburg-St. Georg	1977	IGMG	Association established in 1977 and current mosque completed during the 1990s
al-Quds Mosque		Hamburg-St. Georg	1993	Su	Closed by German security officials in 2010 amid suspicion that it was being used as a meeting place for Islamic extremists involved in the 2010 European terror plot.
Al-Nour Mosque (Hamburg)		Hamburg-Horn	2018	U	Former abandoned church, converted to a mosque; administered by Islamisches Zentrum Al-Nour e.V. - 'Kuwait'

== Hesse ==
Name	Images	City	Year	Group	Remarks
Noor Mosque		Frankfurt am Main	1959	AMJ	The first mosque in Frankfurt and the third in Germany
Abu Bakr Moschee		Frankfurt am Main	1966	IGF	One of the biggest mosques in Frankfurt
Baitus Shakur		Groß-Gerau	1992	AMJ	Largest Ahmadiyya mosque in Germany. Capacity: 850.
Nuur-ud-Din Mosque		Darmstadt	2003	AMJ	Haasstraße 1a, 64293 Darmstadt
Baitul Huda Mosque		Usingen	2004	AMJ	
Fatih Mosque		Stadtallendorf	2004	DITIB	
Bait-ul Aziz		Riedstadt	2004	AMJ	
Bashir Mosque		Bensheim	2006	AMJ	
Muqeet Mosque		Wabern	2007	AMJ	
Anwar Mosque		Rodgau	2008	AMJ	
Baitul Ghafur		Ginsheim-Gustavsburg	2011	AMJ	Lange Streng 13, 65462 Ginsheim-Gustavsburg
Baitul Hadi Mosque		Seligenstadt	2011	AMJ	
Baitul Baqi		Dietzenbach	2011	AMJ	
Baitul Aman		Nidda	2011	AMJ	
Mevlana Mosque (Kassel-Oberzwehren)		Kassel	2014	U	
Baitus Samad Mosque		Giessen	2017	AMJ	Marburger Straße 83, 35396 Gießen
Ata Mosque		Flörsheim am Main		AMJ	Altkönigstraße 10, 65439 Flörsheim am Main
Bait-ul-Baqi Mosque		Dietzenbach		AMJ	Theodor-Heuss-Ring 48, 63128 Dietzenbach
Dar-ul-Amaan Mosque		Friedberg		AMJ	Strassheimer Straße 16, 61169 Friedberg
Bait-ul-Wahid Mosque		Hanau		AMJ	Hafenstraße 6, 63450 Hanau
Sadiq Mosque		Karben		AMJ	Am Spitzacker 18b, 61184 Karben
Mahmud Mosque		Kassel		AMJ	Graf-Haeseler-Straße 6, 34134 Kassel
Baitul Jame Mosque		Offenbach am Main		AMJ	Boschweg 7

== Lower Saxony ==
Name	Images	City	Year	Group	Remarks
Salimya Mosque		Göttingen	2006	DİTİB	
Baitus Sami		Hannover	2008	AMJ	The local community opposed construction of the mosque, with sometimes violent protests.
Islamisches Kulturzentrum Wolfsburg		Wolfsburg		U	Located at Berliner Ring 39, 38440 Wolfsburg. The Imam is Arabic. This mosque attracts all the Muslims in the city, majority of which are Turkish. Official website

== North Rhine-Westphalia ==
Name	Images	City	Year	Group	Remarks
Bilal Mosque		Aachen	1964	IZA	Maintained by Islamisches Zentrum Aachen
Wesseling Mosque (Turkish: Mimar Sinan Camii)		Wesseling	1987	DİTİB	
King Fahd Mosque		Bonn-Bad Godesberg	1995	SA	Adjacent school and mosque closed in 2017
Baitul Momin		Münster-Hiltrup	2003	AMJ	
Hürth Camii		Hürth	2004	DİTİB	
Vatan Mosque		Bielefeld-Brackwede	2004	DİTİB	
Nasir Mosque		Isselburg	2007	AMJ	
Duisburg Cathedral Mosque (German: DITIB-Merkez-Moschee)		Duisburg	2008	DİTİB	Capacity of 1,200 worshippers; the fourth largest mosque in Germany
Cologne Central Mosque		Cologne	2017	DİTİB	Capacity of 4,000 worshippers, it is the largest mosque in Germany.
Alnoor Islamic Zentrum		Belecke		U	Maintained by Islamisches Zentrum Belecke
Mansoor Mosque		Aachen		AMJ	47 (im Navi 45), 52070 Aachen
Merkez Mosque		Wuppertal-Elberfeld		DİTİB	

== Rhineland-Palatinate ==
Name	Images	City	Year	Group	Remarks
Hamd Mosque		Wittlich	1998	AMJ	Capacity of 600 worshippers
Tahir Mosque		Koblenz-Lützel	2004	AMJ	Capacity of 600 worshippers worshippers
DITIB mosque Hachenburg		Hachenburg		DITIB	Capacity of 150 worshippers

== Saxony ==
Name	Images	City	Year	Group	Remarks
al-Rahman Mosque		Leipzig	1998	U	

== Schleswig-Holstein ==
Name	Images	City	Year	Group	Remarks
Bait-ul-Habib Mosque		Kiel	2004	AMJ	Flintbeker Straße 7, 24113 Kiel
Centrum Masjid Rendsburg		Rendsburg	2008	IGMG	Capacity: 300; two 26 m-tall (85 ft) minarets

== Thuringia ==
Name	Images	City	Year	Group	Remarks
Haus des Orients		Weimar	2001	U	Maintained by Haus des Orients e.V.;
Ar-Rahman Mosque		Gera	2010	U	Maintained by Ar-Rahman e.V.

== Legend ==
Abbreviation	Group name
AAIIL	Lahore Ahmadiyya Movement
AMJ	Ahmadiyya Muslim Community
ATIB	Union der Türkisch-Islamischen Kulturvereine in Europa
DİTİB	Diyanet İşleri Türk İslam Birliği
IGF	Islamische Gemeinde Frankfurt e.V.
IGMG	Millî Görüş
IZA	Islamic Centre Aachen
IZM	Islamic Centre Munich
Lib	Liberal Islam
SA	Saudi Arabia (Wahhabism)
Surry Hills	Shia Islam
Su	Sunni Islam
TJ	Tablighi Jamaat
U	Unknown

== See also ==
- Islam in Germany
- List of mosques in Europe
