= Baitul Huda Mosque =

Baitul Huda Mosque may refer to

- Baitul Huda Mosque, Sydney, Australia
- Baitul Huda Mosque, Usingen, Germany
