= Baitul Ghafur Mosque, Ginsheim =

Mosque in Hesse, Germany

Baitul Ghafur Mosque
- Baitul Ghafur Moschee
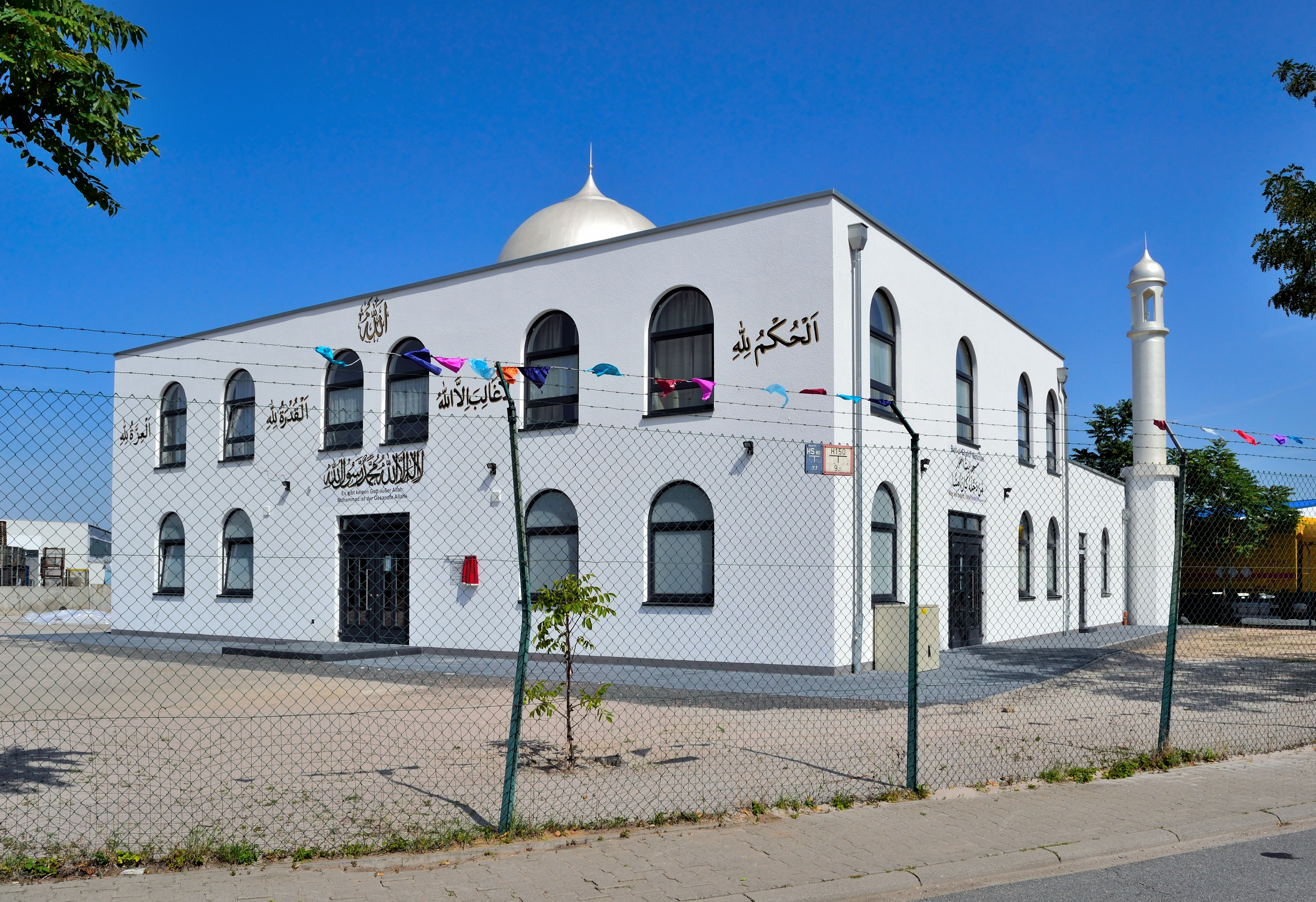

- Location of the mosque in Hesse

Religion
- Affiliation: Ahmadiyya Islam
- Ecclesiastical or organizational status: Mosque
- Governing body: Ahmadiyya Muslim Jamaat Deutschland K.d.ö.R.
- Status: Active

Location
- Location: Ginsheim, Hesse
- Country: Germany
- Interactive map of Baitul Ghafur Mosque
- Coordinates: 49°59′23″N 8°19′55″E

Architecture
- Type: Mosque
- Completed: 2011
- Construction cost: €1.2 million

Specifications
- Capacity: 400 worshippers
- Dome: 1
- Minaret: 1

The Baitul Ghafur Mosque (German: Baitul Ghafur Moschee) is a mosque in Ginsheim, in the state of Hesse, Germany.

The mosque is administered by the Ahmadiyya Muslim Jamaat Deutschland K.d.ö.R. (AMJ).

== See also ==
- Ahmadiyya in Germany
- Islam in Germany
- List of mosques in Germany
- List of Ahmadiyya buildings and structures in Germany
