= Baitul Huda =

Baitul Huda (House of Guidance) may refer to:

- Baitul Huda (Sydney), Australia
- Baitul Huda (Usingen), Germany
