= Noor Mosque, Frankfurt =

Mosque in Sachsenhausen, Frankfurt, Germany

Noor Mosque
- Nuur-Moschee
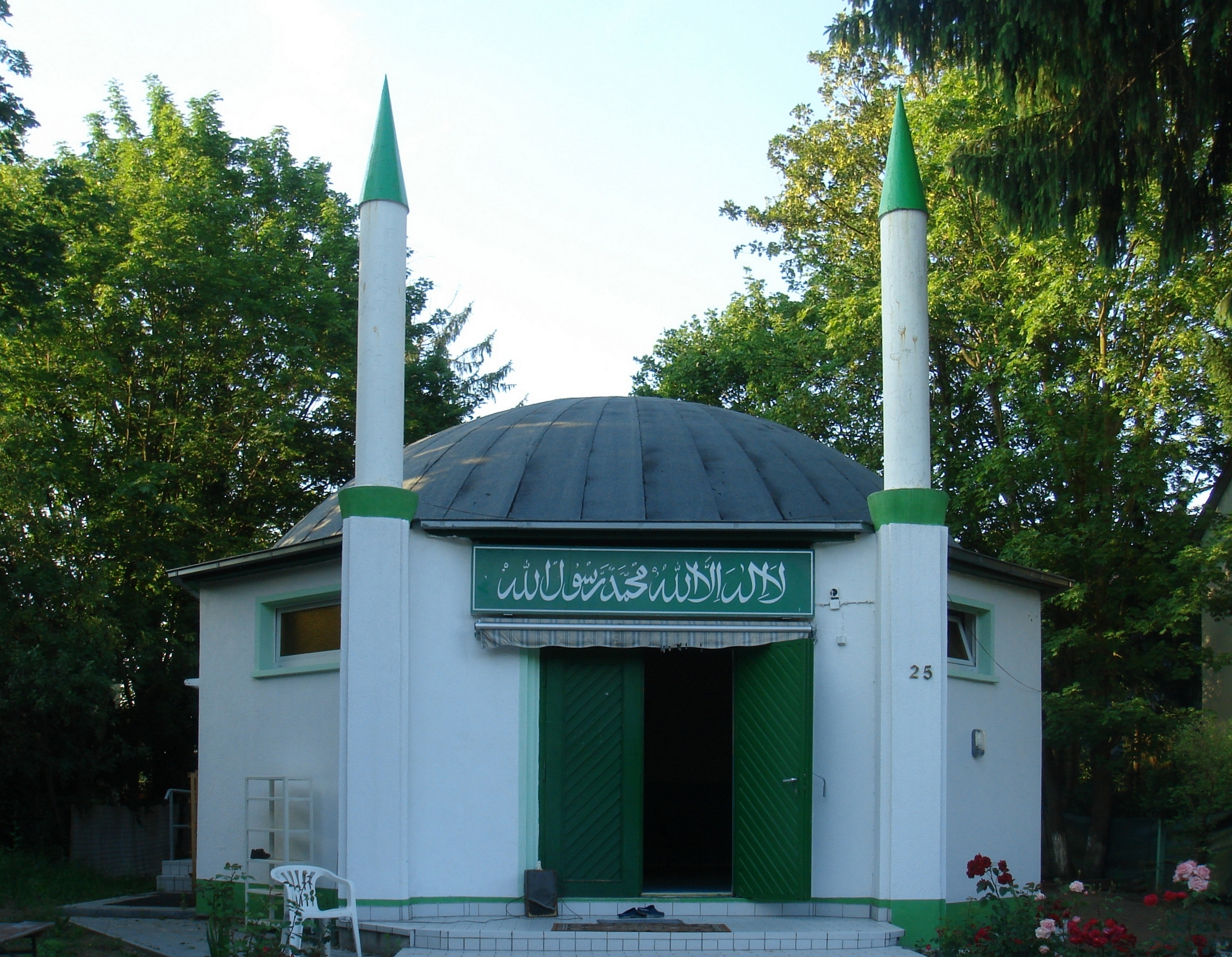

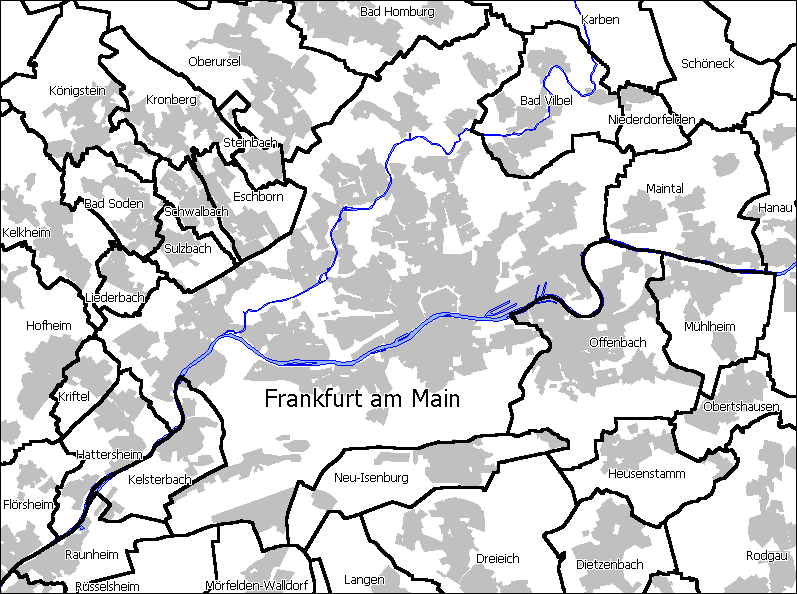
- Location within Frankfurt am Main

Religion
- Affiliation: Ahmadiyya Islam
- Ecclesiastical or organisational status: Mosque
- Governing body: Ahmadiyya Muslim Jamaat Deutschland K.d.ö.R.
- Status: Active

Location
- Location: Sachsenhausen, Frankfurt, Hesse
- Country: Germany
- Interactive map of Noor Mosque
- Coordinates: 50°05′08″N 8°41′47″E

Architecture
- Type: Mosque
- Completed: 1959

Specifications
- Capacity: 125 worshippers
- Minaret: 2
- Minaret height: 5–8 m (16–26 ft)

Website
- nuur-moschee.de (in German)

The Noor Mosque (German: Nuur-Moschee; Urdu: مسجدِ نور, lit. 'Mosque of the spiritual light') is a mosque located in Sachsenhausen, in the city of Frankfurt, in the state of Hesse, Germany. Situated on Babenhäuser Landstraße and completed in 1959, the mosque is the first purpose-built mosque in Frankfurt and the third in Germany.

Muhammad Ali, a famous boxer, prayed in the mosque on one occasion.

== History ==
The mosque's foundation stone was laid on 8 May 1957; and the mosque was inaugurated by Sir Muhammad Zafrulla Khan on 12 September 1959.

Before the Ahmadiyya Muslim Community in 1985 bought the Baitus Shakur („Nasir Bagh“) in Groß-Gerau, the annual gathering Jalsa Salana in Germany was celebrated in this mosque.

== Gallery ==
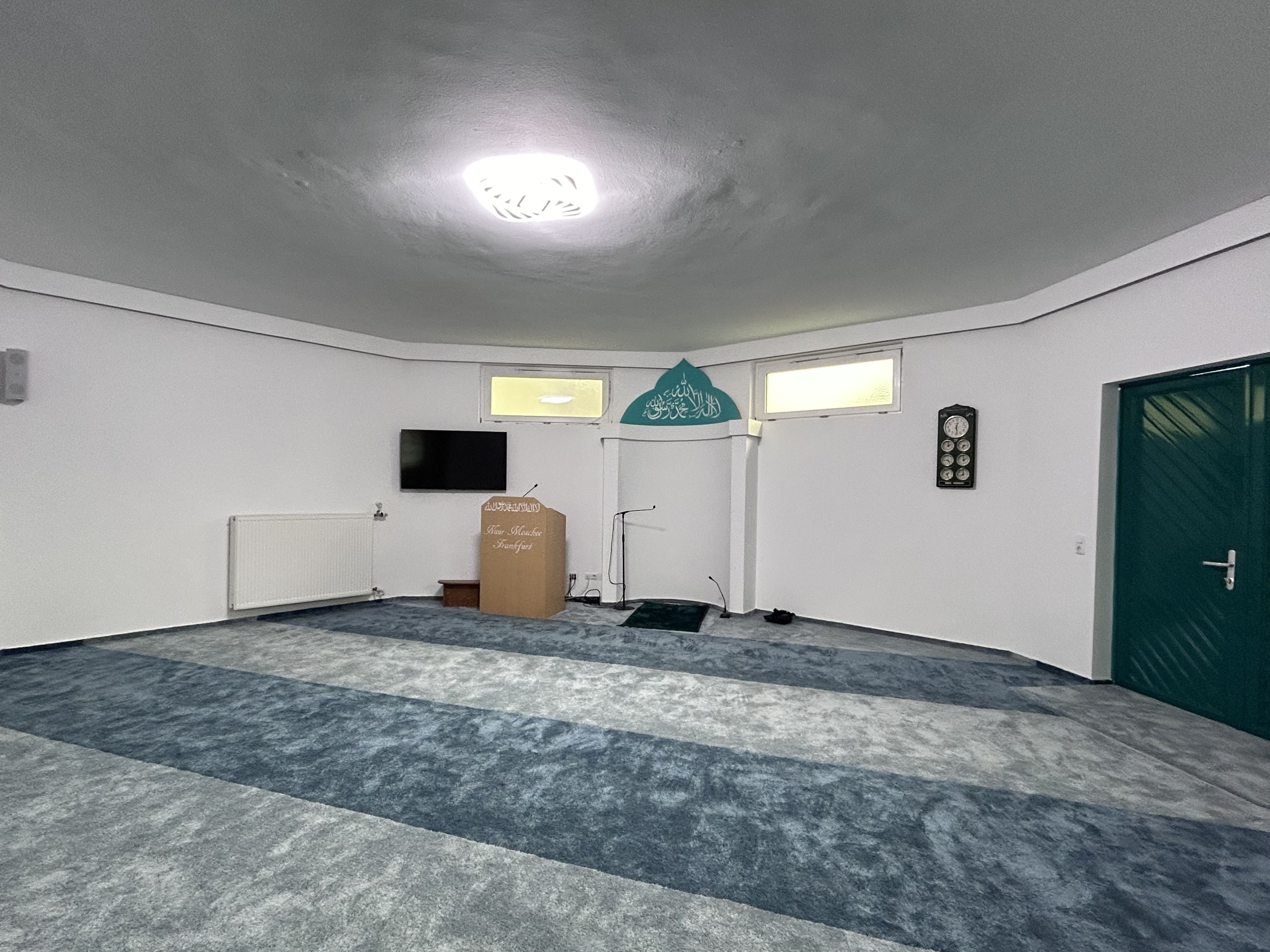
The mosque interior

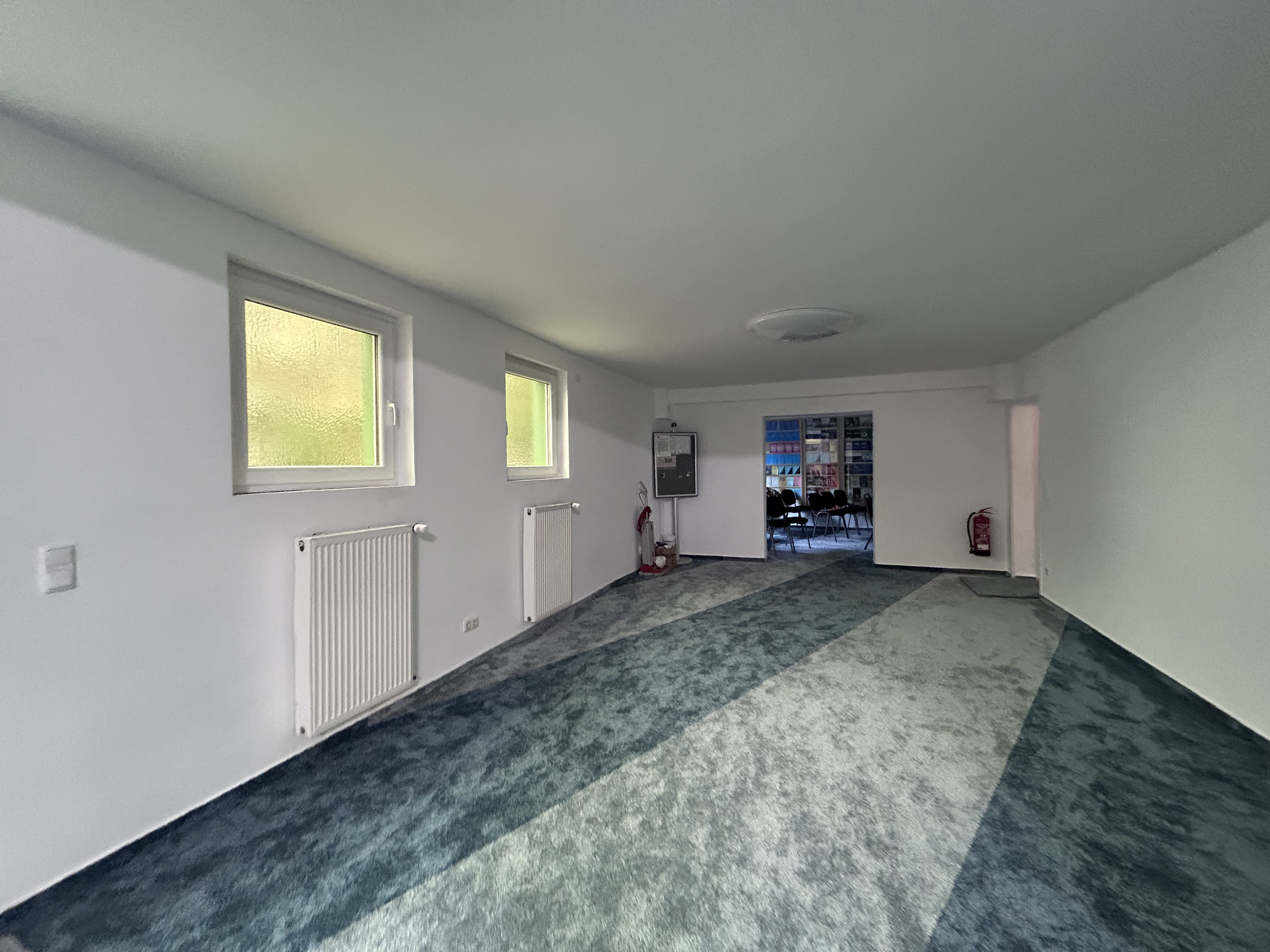
The prayer hall

== See also ==
- Ahmadiyya in Germany
- Islam in Germany
- List of mosques in Germany
- List of Ahmadiyya buildings and structures in Germany
