= Ehsaan Mosque, Mannheim =

Mosque in Mannheim, Baden-Württemberg, Germany

Ehsan Mosque
- Ehsan Moschee
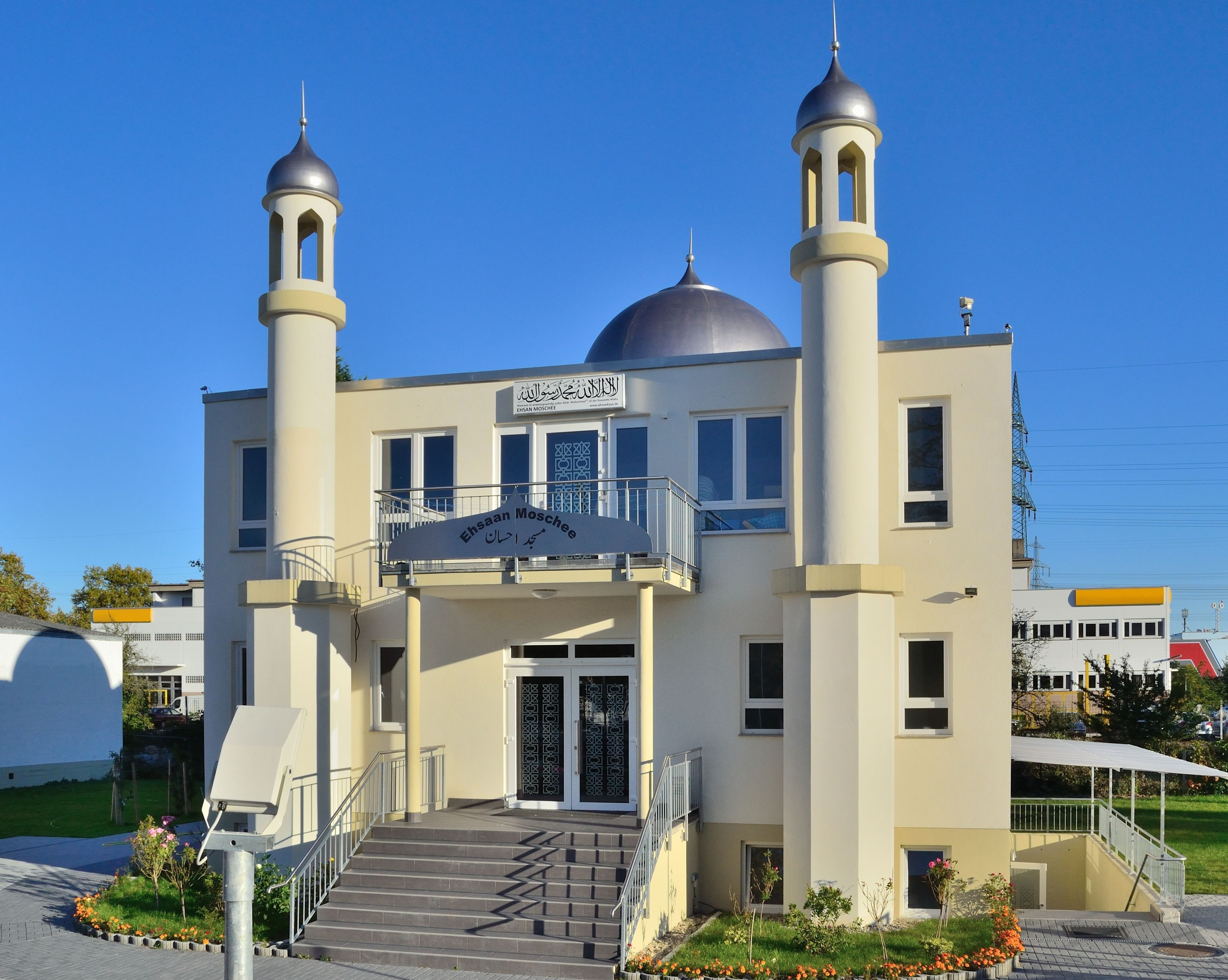

- Location of the mosque in Baden-Württemberg

Religion
- Affiliation: Ahmadiyya Islam
- Ecclesiastical or organisational status: Mosque
- Governing body: Ahmadiyya Muslim Jamaat Deutschland K.d.ö.R.
- Status: Active

Location
- Location: Mannheim, Baden-Württemberg
- Country: Germany
- Interactive map of Ehsan Mosque
- Coordinates: 49°26′56″N 8°30′21″E

Architecture
- Type: Mosque
- Groundbreaking: 17 December 2008
- Completed: 2010
- Construction cost: €1 million

Specifications
- Capacity: 450 worshippers
- Dome: 1
- Minaret: 2

The Ehsan Mosque (German: Ehsan Moschee; Urdu: مسجد احسان) is a mosque in Mannheim, in the state of Baden-Württemberg, Germany. It was completed in July 2010 and has a capacity of 450 worshippers. The mosque is administered by the Ahmadiyya Muslim Jamaat Deutschland K.d.ö.R. (AMJ).

== Overview ==
The mosque's foundation stone was laid on 17 December 2008. The mosque was inaugurated by the caliph of the Ahmadiyya Muslim Community, Mirza Masroor Ahmad.

== Gallery ==
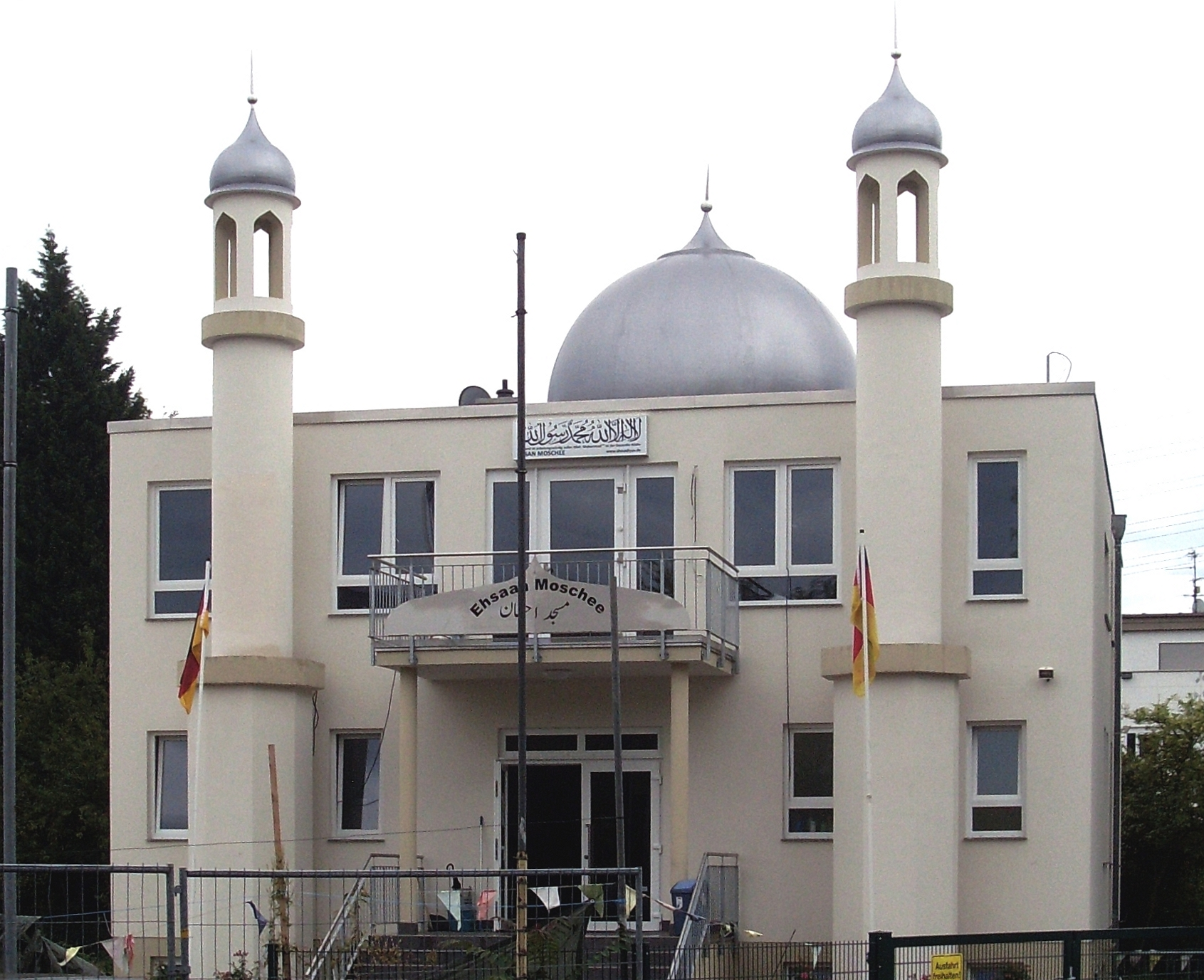
Mosque facade

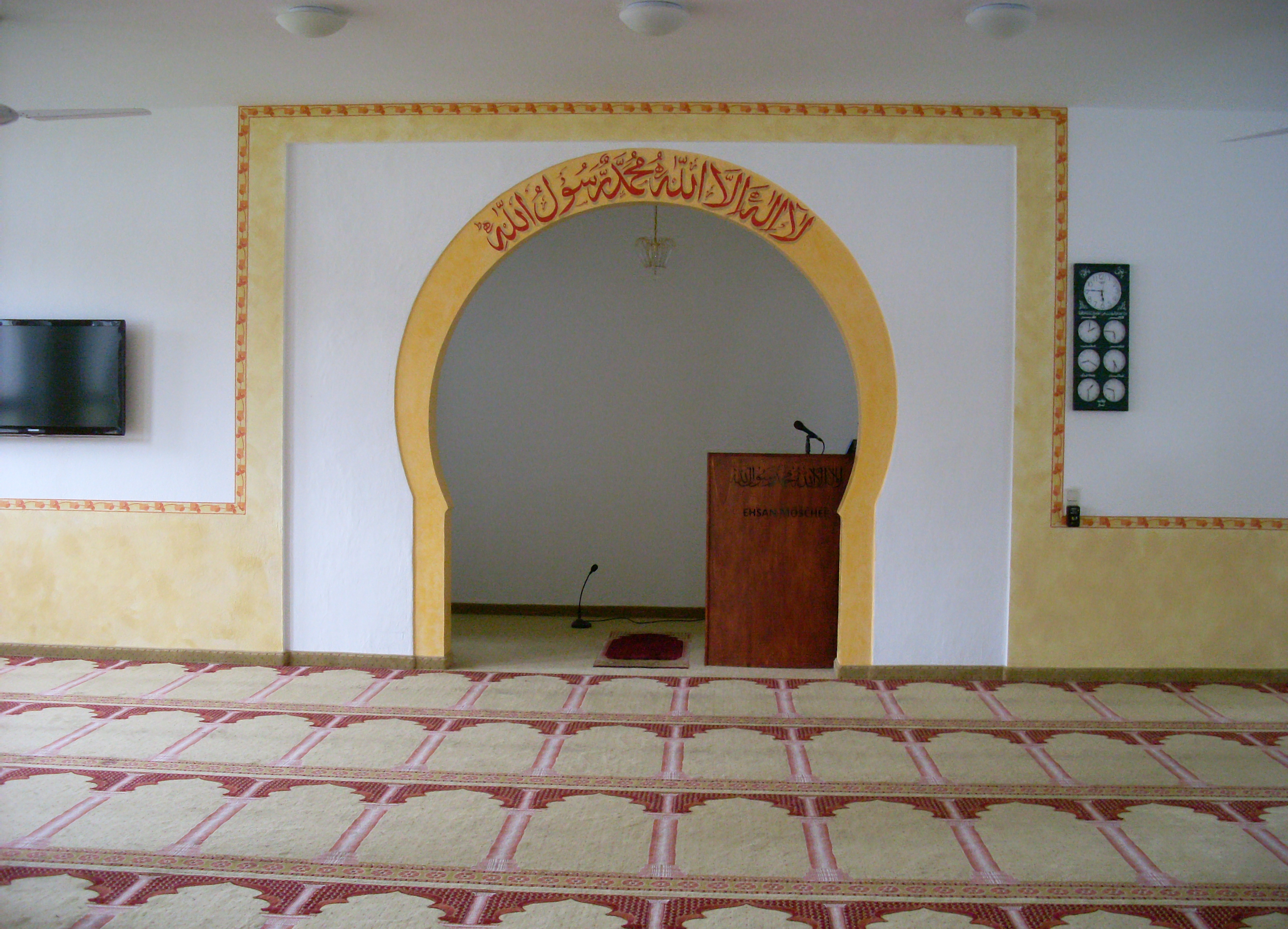
Prayer hall of the mosque

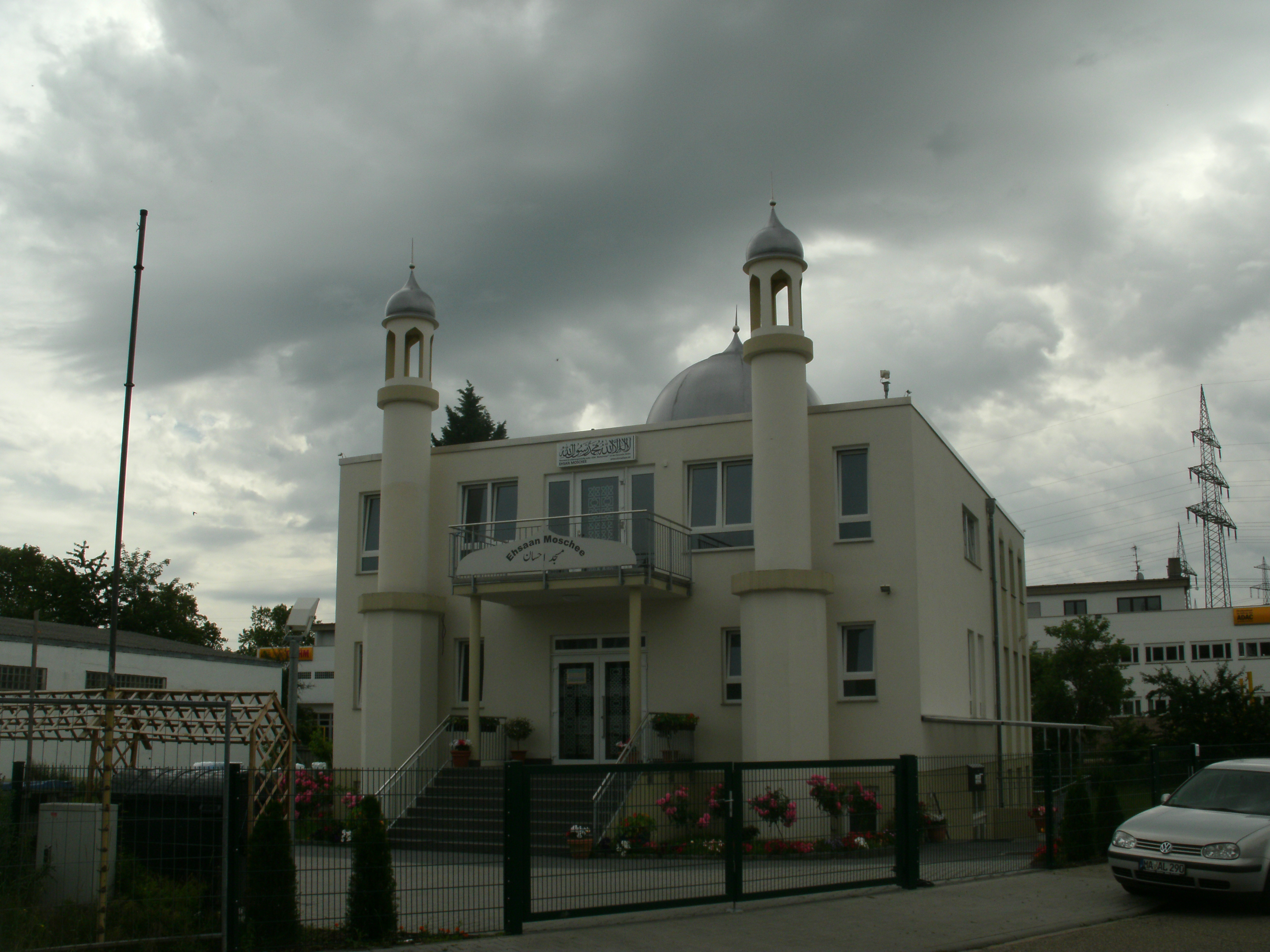
View of the mosque from the road

== See also ==
- Ahmadiyya in Germany
- Islam in Germany
- List of mosques in Germany
- List of Ahmadiyya buildings and structures in Germany
