= Baitus Samee Mosque =

Baitus Samee Mosque or Baitus Sami Mosque may refer to:

- Baitus Sami Mosque, Hanover, in Germany
- Baitus Samee Mosque, Houston, in Texas, United States
