= Baitul Jame Mosque, Offenbach =

Mosque in Offenbach am Main, Germany

Baitul Jame Mosque
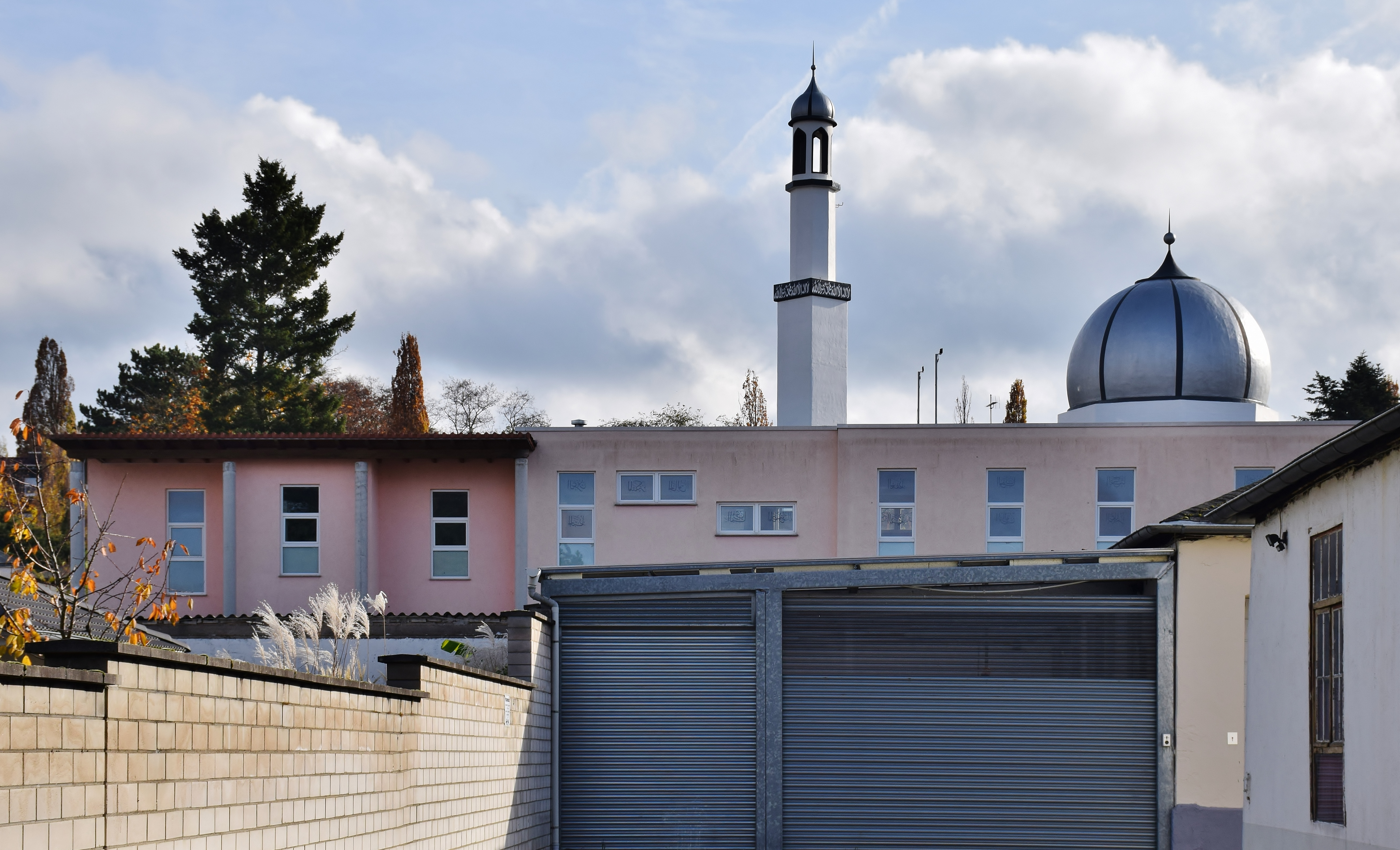

- Location of the mosque in Hesse

Religion
- Affiliation: Ahmadiyya Islam
- Ecclesiastical or organizational status: Mosque
- Ownership: Ahmadiyya Muslim Jamaat Deutschland K.d.ö.R.
- Status: Active

Location
- Location: Offenbach am Main, Hesse
- Country: Germany
- Interactive map of Baitul Jame Mosque
- Coordinates: 50°05′56″N 08°47′27″E

Architecture
- Architect: Mubashra Ilyas
- Type: Mosque

Specifications
- Dome: 1
- Minaret: 1

Website
- www.ahmadiyya.de/

The Baitul Jame Mosque is a mosque in Offenbach am Main, in the state of Hesse, Germany. largest mosques, situated on Boschweg in Offenbach am Main.

The mosque was designed by Mubashra Ilyas and is administered by the Ahmadiyya Muslim Jamaat Deutschland K.d.ö.R. (AMJ).

== See also ==
- Ahmadiyya in Germany
- Islam in Germany
- List of mosques in Germany
- List of Ahmadiyya buildings and structures in Germany
