= Tahir Mosque =

Tahir Mosque may refer to:

- Tahir Mosque, Koblenz, Germany
- Tahir Mosque, Payangadi, India

== See also ==
- Tahir
