= Mosque in Sendling =

Mosque in Munich, Germany

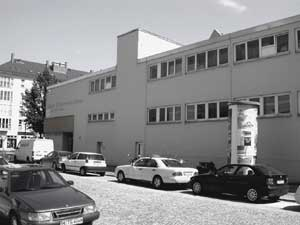
- The mosque in 2005

Religion
- Affiliation: Islam
- Ecclesiastical or organizational status: Mosque
- Status: Active

Location
- Location: Sendling, Munich, Bavaria
- Country: Germany
- Interactive map of Mosque in Sendling
- Coordinates: 48°07′05″N 11°33′05″E

Architecture
- Type: Mosque
- Style: Modern
- Completed: 1989
- Capacity: 130 worshippers

Website
- ditib.de (in German)

The Mosque in Sendling is a mosque located on Schanzenbachstraße, in Munich, Bavaria, Germany. The mosque was completed in 1989 as an Islamic prayer house mainly for Turkish Muslims.

== Name and organisation ==
The official name of the mosque is the German Turkish-Islamic Center for the Institute for Religion (Turkish: Diyanet İşleri Türk İslam Merkezi; abbreviated as DITIM), and is also designated to the mosque association, to which 42 members and their families belong. The association is linked to the federation Diyanet İşleri Türk İslam Birliği (DITIB), and stands under the supervision of the Turkish president for Religious Affairs Diyanet İşleri Bakanlığı.

DITIB also selects the imam of the mosque, who usually speaks little German and is a civil servant of the Turkish state.

DITIB also operates two other mosques in Munich, in Passing, and Allach. The Schanzenbachstraße Mosque is the biggest of the three mosques in Munich, and is laid out for approximately 130 visitors. This has proved in practice untenable, as at peak times, up to 700 visitors come to pray.

== Plan to build a new mosque ==
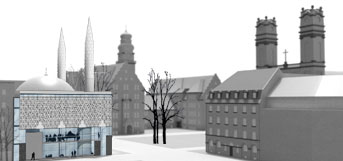
Architect Walter Höfler plans for the new mosque (left) and existing church (right), 2006

DITIB submitted plans in 2004 for a change to the building, which caused resistance among people living near the building. DITIB worked with the City of Munich to help find a suitable place for a new building, at Gotzinger Place, opposite the Roman Catholic church. However, those new building plans were also attacked, and the press have covered the arguments since Spring 2005. Designed by Walter Höfler, a local architect, upon completion the new mosque minarets are expected to be 40 metres (130 ft) tall; that is some 14 metres (46 ft) shorter than the steeples of the adjacent church.

== See also ==
- Islam in Germany
- List of mosques in Germany
