= DİTİB Kocatepe Mosque, Ingolstadt =

Mosque in Ingolstadt, Germany

DİTİB Kocatepe Mosque
- DİTİB Kocatepe-Moschee; DİTİB Kocatepe Camii
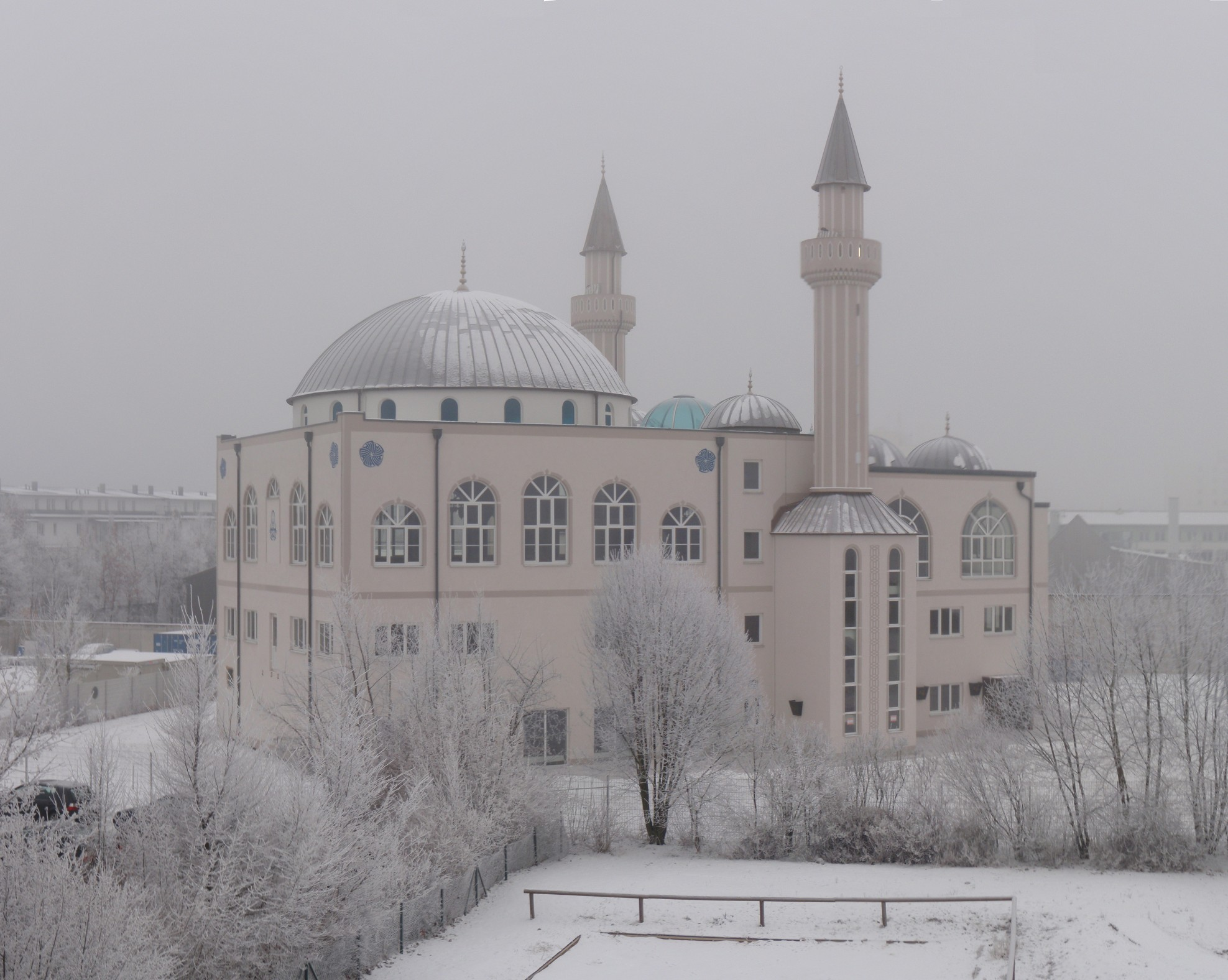
- The mosque, in January 2009

- Location within Bavaria

Religion
- Affiliation: Sunni Islam
- Ecclesiastical or organizational status: Mosque; Cultural center
- Ownership: Diyanet İşleri Türk İslam Birliği
- Status: Active

Location
- Location: Ingolstadt, Bavaria
- Country: Germany
- Interactive map of DİTİB Kocatepe Mosque
- Coordinates: 48°46′41″N 11°25′25″E

Architecture
- Architect: Hüssein Portakal
- Type: Mosque
- Style: Neo-Ottoman
- Established: 1987 (association)
- Completed: 2008
- Construction cost: €5.5 million

Specifications
- Capacity: 800 worshippers
- Length: 36.2 m (119 ft)
- Width: 18.4 m (60 ft)
- Dome: 1
- Dome height (outer): 5 m (16 ft)
- Minaret: 2
- Minaret height: 27.5 m (90 ft)

Website
- ditib-ingolstadt.de (in German)

The DİTİB Kocatepe Mosque (Turkish: Kocatepe Camii ve Kültür Merkezi İngolstadt; German: Kocatepe Moschee und Kulturzentrum zu Ingolstadt) is a mosque and Islamic cultural center, located in Ingolstadt, Bavaria, Germany.

== History ==
The Turkish-Islamic Association of Ingolstadt was founded on 12 May 1987 by Diyanet İşleri Türk İslam Birliği (DİTİB) and has 540 members.

The mosque was completed in 2008 at a cost of €5.5 million.

== Architecture ==
=== Mosque ===
The three-story mosque is inspired by Neo-Ottoman architecture, has two minarets, both approximately 27.5 metres (90 ft) tall, and a big dome that is approximately 5 metres (16 ft) high. The prayer room has white and blue carpets, with capacity for 800 worshippers, plus a 135-square-metre (1,450 sq ft) gallery floor for female worshippers. The mosque's walls are decorated with different calligraphy.

=== Cultural center ===
The cultural center is 611 square metres (6,580 sq ft). In the basement, in addition to storage and sanitary facilities, there is a mortuary for funeral ceremonies and washrooms for wudu. On the ground floor there is a grocery store, a restaurant as well as the club premises. On the first floor there is a youth room, a library, women's rooms and children's rooms as well as lecture rooms and office rooms.

A 420-square-metre (4,500 sq ft) adjacent building has a Quran school as well as two apartments, one each for the imam and janitor.

== See also ==
- Islam in Germany
- List of mosques in Germany
