= Baitus Sami Mosque (Hanover) =

Mosque in Hanover, Germany

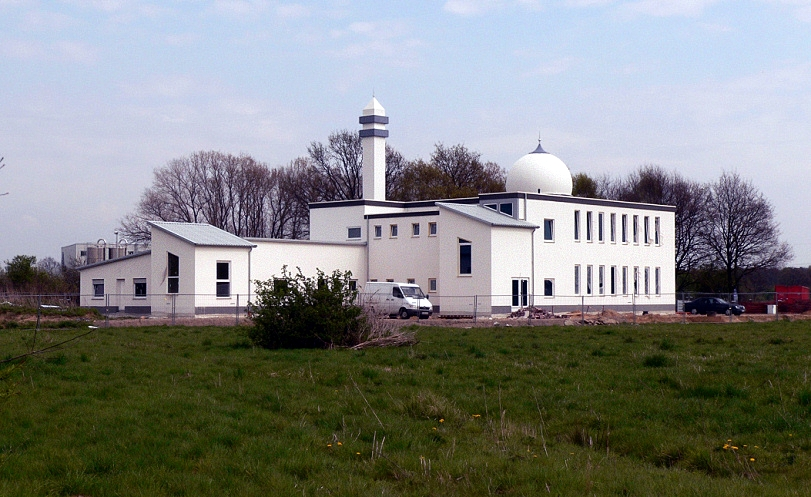

- Location within Lower Saxony

Religion
- Affiliation: Ahmadiyya Islam
- Ecclesiastical or organizational status: Mosque
- Governing body: Ahmadiyya Muslim Jamaat Deutschland K.d.ö.R.

Location
- Location: Hanover, Lower Saxony
- Country: Germany
- Interactive map of Baitus Sami Mosque
- Coordinates: 52°25′47″N 9°39′29″E

Architecture
- Type: Mosque
- Completed: 2008

Specifications
- Capacity: 300
- Dome: 1
- Minaret: 1
- Minaret height: 16 m (52 ft)
- Site area: 2,800 m^{2} (30,000 sq ft)

Website
- ahmadiyya.de/gebetsstaette/moscheen/hannover-stoecken/

The Baitus Sami Mosque (lit. 'house of the hearer') is a mosque located in Hanover, in the state of Lower Saxony, Germany. The mosque is administered by the Ahmadiyya Muslim Jamaat Deutschland K.d.ö.R. (AMJ).

== Overview ==
It has both a dome and minaret, although the minaret is too slender to be climbed. Built by an Ahmadiyya community, the mosque comprises approximately 2,800 square metres (30,000 sq ft), with space for 300 worshippers. Situated at a street in an industrial area outside a nearby residential area, it was inaugurated in August 2008 by the Caliph of the community, Mirza Masroor Ahmad. The construction of the mosque was opposed by many local people, with sometimes violent protests.

== See also ==
- Ahmadiyya in Germany
- Islam in Germany
- List of mosques in Germany
- List of Ahmadiyya buildings and structures in Germany
