= Tahir Mosque, Koblenz =

Mosque in Koblenz, Germany

Tahir Mosque
- Tahir Moschee
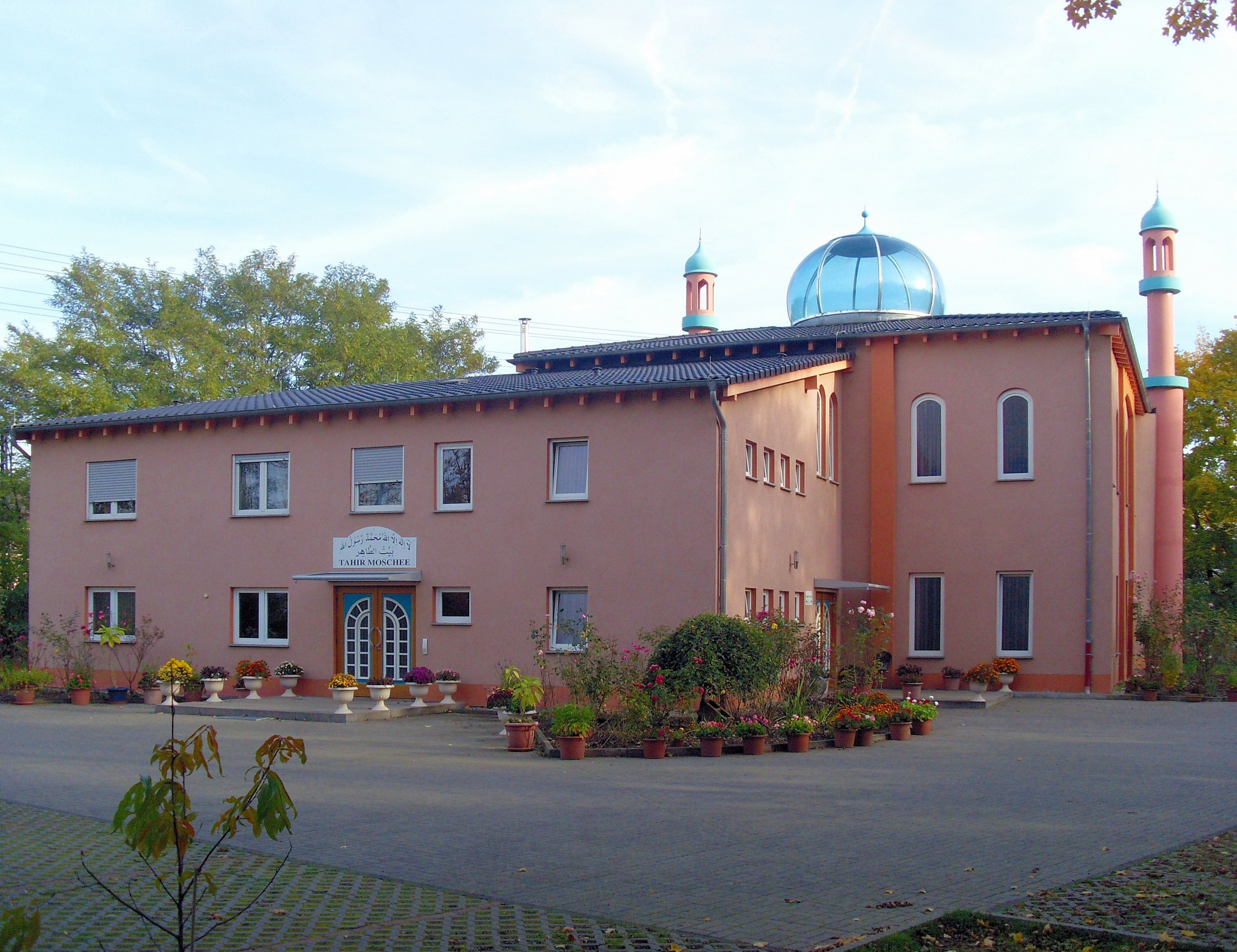

- Location of the mosque in Rhineland-Palatinate

Religion
- Affiliation: Ahmadiyya Islam
- Ecclesiastical or organizational status: Mosque
- Governing body: Ahmadiyya Muslim Jamaat Deutschland K.d.ö.R.
- Status: Active

Location
- Location: Koblenz, Rhineland-Palatinate
- Country: Germany
- Interactive map of Tahir Mosque
- Coordinates: 50°22′31″N 7°35′31″E

Architecture
- Type: Mosque
- Completed: 2004

Specifications
- Capacity: 600 worshippers
- Dome: 1
- Minaret: 2

The Tahir Mosque (German: Tahir Moschee) is a mosque in Koblenz, in the state of Rhineland-Palatinate, Germany. The mosque is administered by the Ahmadiyya Muslim Jamaat Deutschland K.d.ö.R. (AMJ).

== See also ==
- Ahmadiyya in Germany
- Islam in Germany
- List of mosques in Germany
- List of Ahmadiyya buildings and structures in Germany
