= Hamburg Central Mosque =

Mosque in Hamburg, Germany

- Centrum-Moschee Hamburg; Merkez Camii
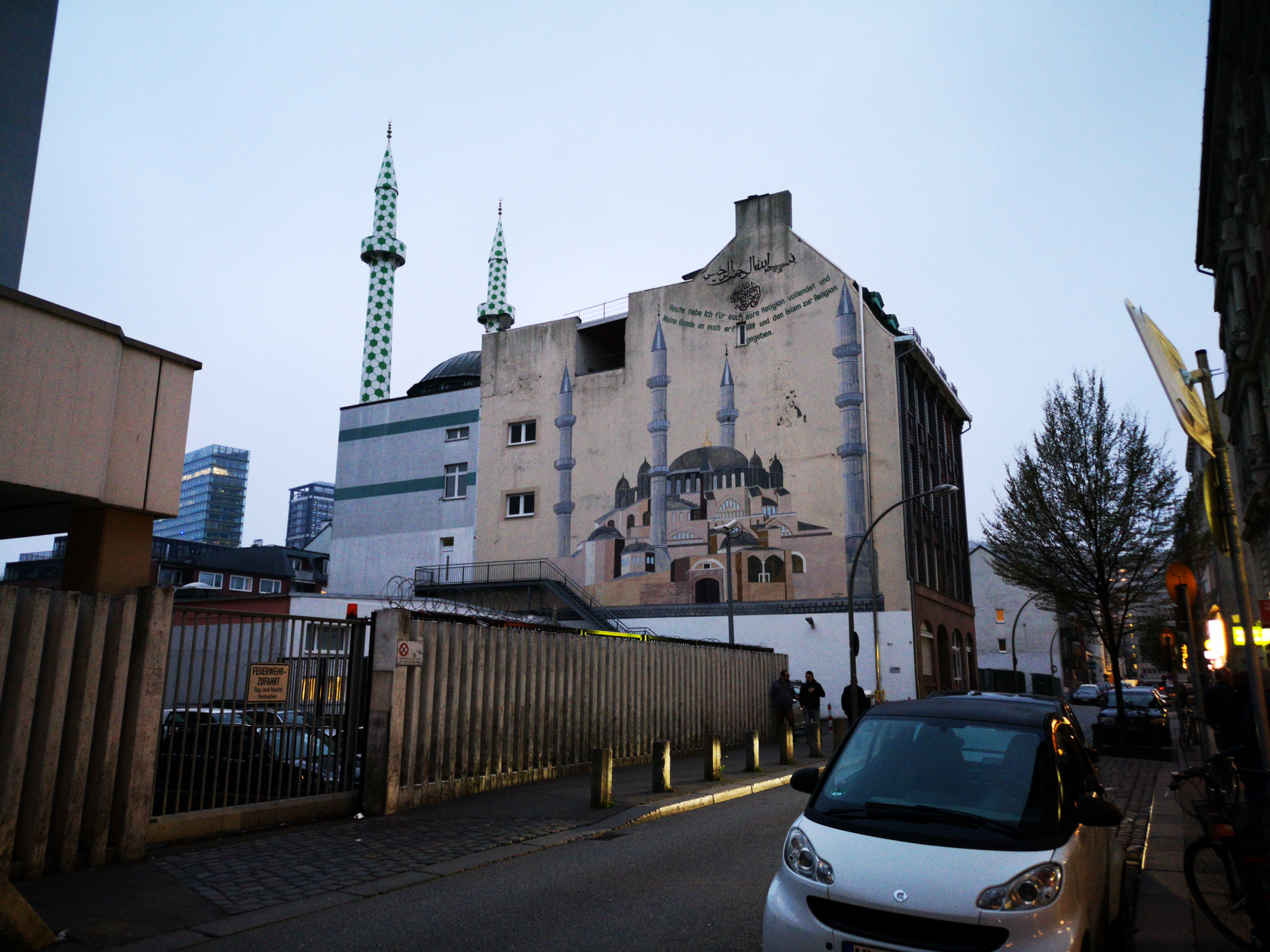
- The mosque in 2019

- Location within Germany

Religion
- Affiliation: Sunni Islam
- Ecclesiastical or organizational status: Mosque
- Status: Active

Location
- Location: Böckmannstraße 40, St. Georg, Hamburg
- Country: Germany
- Interactive map of Hamburg Central Mosque
- Coordinates: 53°33′15″N 10°01′00″E

Architecture
- Type: Mosque
- Style: Islamic architecture
- Established: 1977 (association)
- Groundbreaking: 1992
- Completed: c. 1990s

Specifications
- Dome: 1
- Minaret: 2

The Hamburg Central Mosque (German: Centrum-Moschee Hamburg; Turkish: Merkez Camii) is a mosque located in the St. Georg district of Hamburg, Germany.

== History ==
The community of mosques was founded in 1977 by Turkish guest workers and was originally called the Society of Turkish Workers in Hamburg and its environs for the founding and construction of a mosque, also known as the Association of Mosques. The initial building, purchased in 1977, housed a bathhouse, the former Bath Hammonia.

In 1990, a new building commenced, attached to the old building. A dome and two minarets were installed.; making the building recognizable as a mosque. The groundbreaking ceremony in 1992 was attended by the then Prime Minister of Turkey Nedcmettin Erbakan, who at that time was the leader of the movement Milli Görüş.

In 2001, the association's name was changed to Islamische Gemeinde Hamburg — Centrum-Moschee e.V.. The Islamic community of Hamburg — Centrum-Moschee e.V. is a founding member of Alliance of Islamic Communities in Northern Germany (BIG) and member of Schura Hamburg, with which the State of Hamburg maintains State Treaty.

== Art project minaret ==
In 2009, the minarets of the mosque were painted with a new pattern of green and white hexagons thanks to the collaboration of artist Boran Burchardt and the mosque administration. The project aroused great interest all over the world. For the first time, a work of art was made from a part of the building, externally recognizable as a mosque, moreover, a work of art. The then Bishop of the North Elbe Church Maria Jepsen supported the Muslim request for a daily call muezzina.

== Leadership ==
On February 27, 2016, the Muslim theologian Mehmet Karaoglu was elected imam as chairman of the mosque. He is also President of IGMG -Hamburg and Chairman of BIG. Fatih Yildiz was elected as a deputy. Karaoglu and Yildiz replaced the previous chairman and imam Ramazan Ucar and his deputy Ahmet Yazici after almost two decades.

== Gallery ==
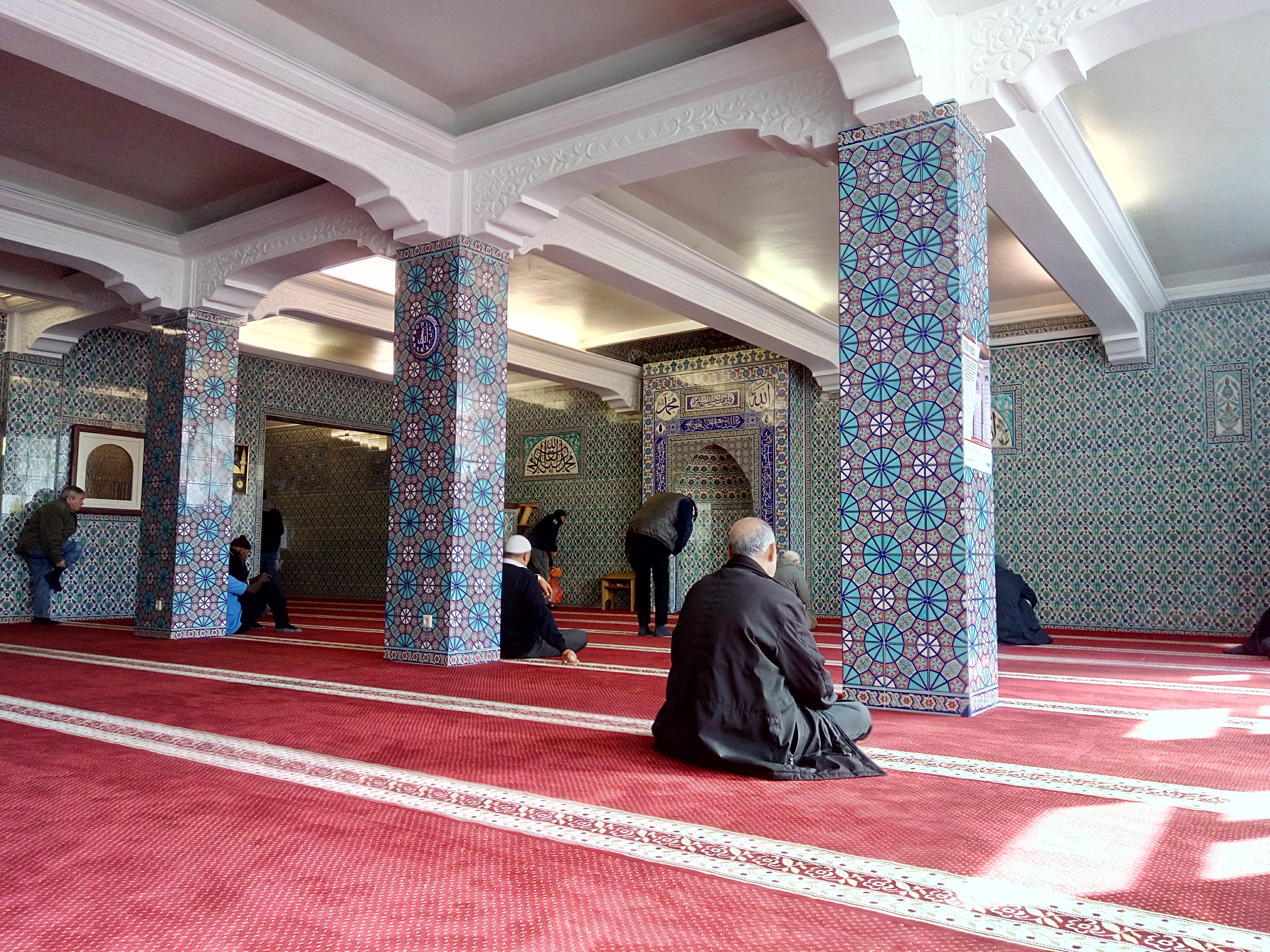
The mosque prayer room

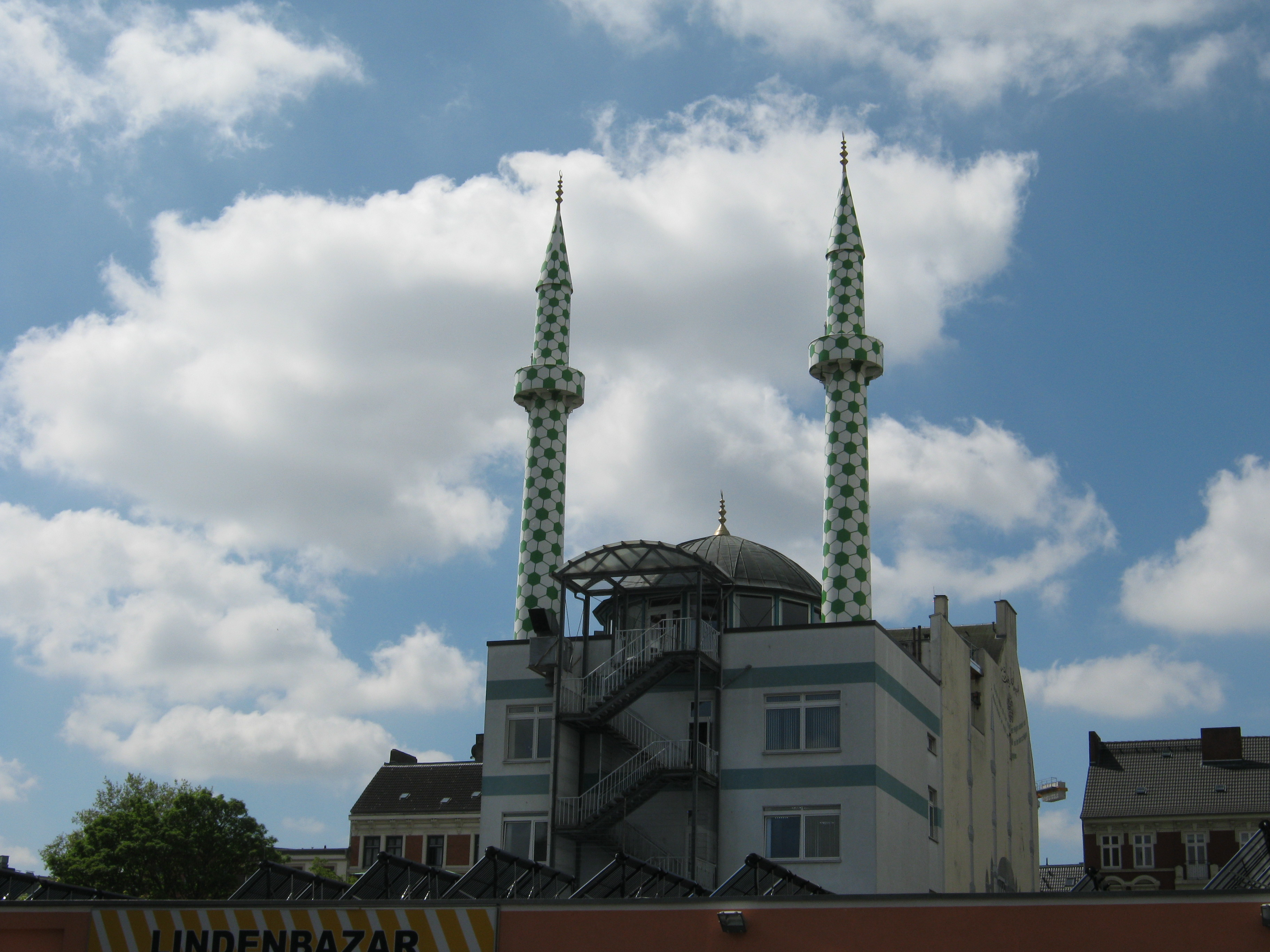
The mosque minaret, in 2014

== See also ==
- Islam in Germany
- List of mosques in Germany
