= Yavuz Sultan Selim Mosque =

Mosque in Mannheim-Jungbusch, Germany

- Yavuz-Sultan-Selim-Moschee
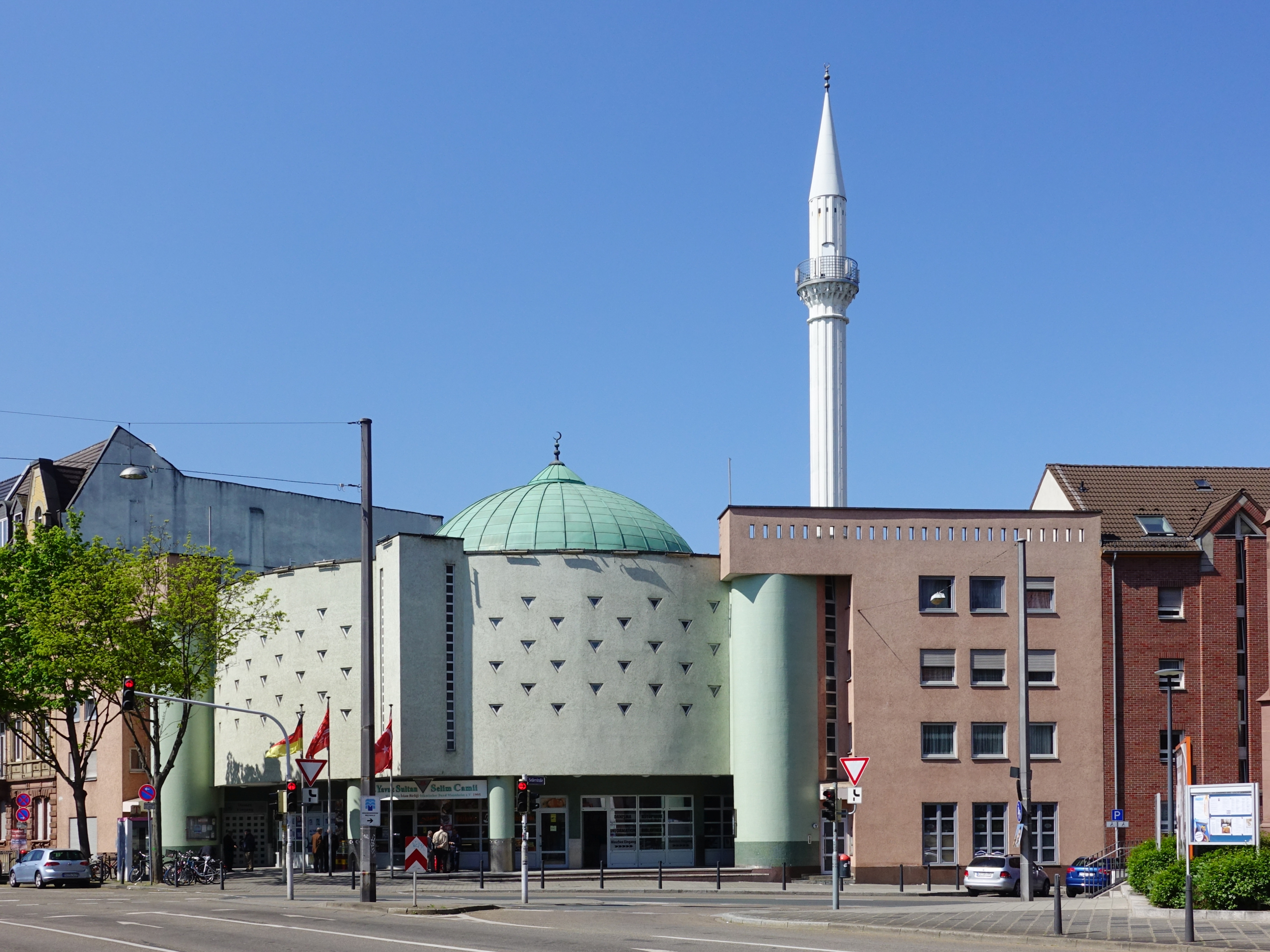

- Location within Baden-Württemberg

Religion
- Affiliation: Islam
- Ecclesiastical or organizational status: Mosque
- Status: Active

Location
- Location: Mannheim, Baden-Württemberg
- Country: Germany
- Interactive map of Yavuz Sultan Selim Mosque
- Administration: Turkish-Islamic Union for Religious Affairs
- Coordinates: 49°29′39″N 8°27′41″E

Architecture
- Type: Mosque
- Style: Postmodern
- Completed: 1995

Specifications
- Capacity: 2,500 worshippers
- Dome: 1
- Minaret: 1

Website
- ditib-ma.de (in German)

The Yavuz-Sultan-Selim Mosque (German: Yavuz-Sultan-Selim-Moschee) is a mosque in Mannheim, Baden-Württemberg, Germany. The mosque was completed in 1995 and named in honour of Selim I. Until 2008 it was the biggest mosque in Germany, and attracted up to 3,000 Muslims for worship every weekend.

Since the mosque was opened, Muslim shops and youth centers have become a magnet for the Muslim community.

== See also ==
- Islam in Germany
- List of mosques in Germany
