= Selimiye Mosque, Deggendorf =

Mosque in Bavaria, Germany

Selimiye Mosque
- Selimiye-Moschee; Selimiye Camii
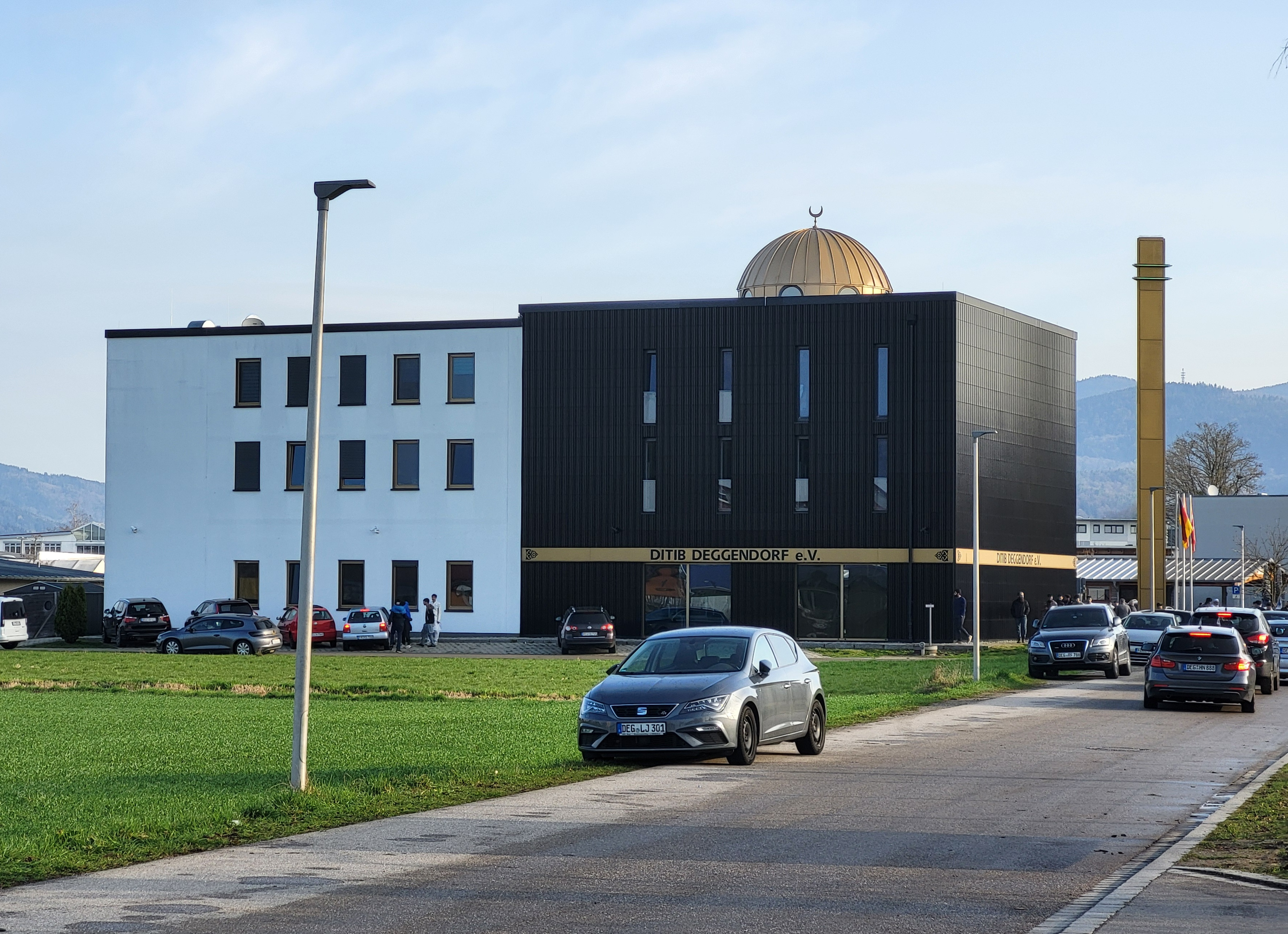
- The mosque in 2025

- Location within Bavaria

Religion
- Affiliation: Sunni Islam
- Ecclesiastical or organisational status: Mosque
- Governing body: Diyanet İşleri Türk İslam Birliği
- Status: Active

Location
- Location: Fischerdorf, Deggendorf, Lower Bavaria
- Country: Germany
- Interactive map of Selimiye Mosque
- Coordinates: 48°49′08″N 12°57′03″E

Architecture
- Architect: Christian Illner
- Type: Mosque
- Style: Contemporary
- Established: 1987 (association)
- Completed: 2016 (current structure)
- Construction cost: €3.2 million

Specifications
- Capacity: c. 300 worshippers
- Dome: 1
- Dome height (inner): 4.1 m (13 ft)
- Minaret: 1
- Minaret height: 15.7 m (52 ft)
- Site area: 3,456 m^{2} (37,200 sq ft)

Website
- ditib-deggendorf.de (in German)

The Selimiye Mosque (German: Selimiye-Moschee; Turkish: Selimiye Camii) is a mosque located in Fischerdorf, Deggendorf, in Lower Bavaria. Germany. The Islamic community was founded by Diyanet İşleri Türk İslam Birliği (DİTİB) in 1987, and the current mosque was completed in 2016 at a cost of €3.2 million.

== History ==
The Turkish-Islamic Community in Deggendorf and its cultural center were both founded on 22 July 1987 in the Stadt-Au part of Deggendorf. The mosque was later built in 1996 in the Fischerdorf district, but had to be demolished and replaced after the flood disaster in 2013, also affecting Deggendorf. After two years, the mosque was opened in 2016, and was immediately met with criticism because the minaret was 2 metres (6 ft 7 in) higher than allowed. The minaret was subsequently shortened.

== Architecture ==
Designed by Christian Illner, the mosque has a contemporary architectural style in the shape of a black rectangle. In front of the mosque there is a 48-car parking lot, a small kiosk, and tents for those breaking their fast during Ramadan. Set over c.3,456 square metres (37,200 sq ft), the mosque has two floors and is divided in the middle into a women's area and a men's area.

In the upper area is the prayer room, which can accommodate around 230 people in the lower men's area and 70 in the upper women's area. On the men's side of the mosque, next to the prayer room, there is a small library, a Quran course, a youth room and the imam's office. The carpet of the prayer room is red and the walls are decorated with calligraphy, Quran verses, the names of Allah, some prophets and the Sahaba. The imam's chair, the mihrab and the minbar are located in the front row, while at the back there is a small area for the muezzin.

In the lower area there are two large common rooms that are used for prayer when there is no space in the actual prayer room and for Iftar in the month of Ramadan, where the community provides Iftar every Friday. On the roof there is a golden dome that is 4 meters high and next to the mosque there are three flags (DITIB, Germany and Turkiye) and a c.16-metre-high (52 ft) minaret.

== Gallery ==
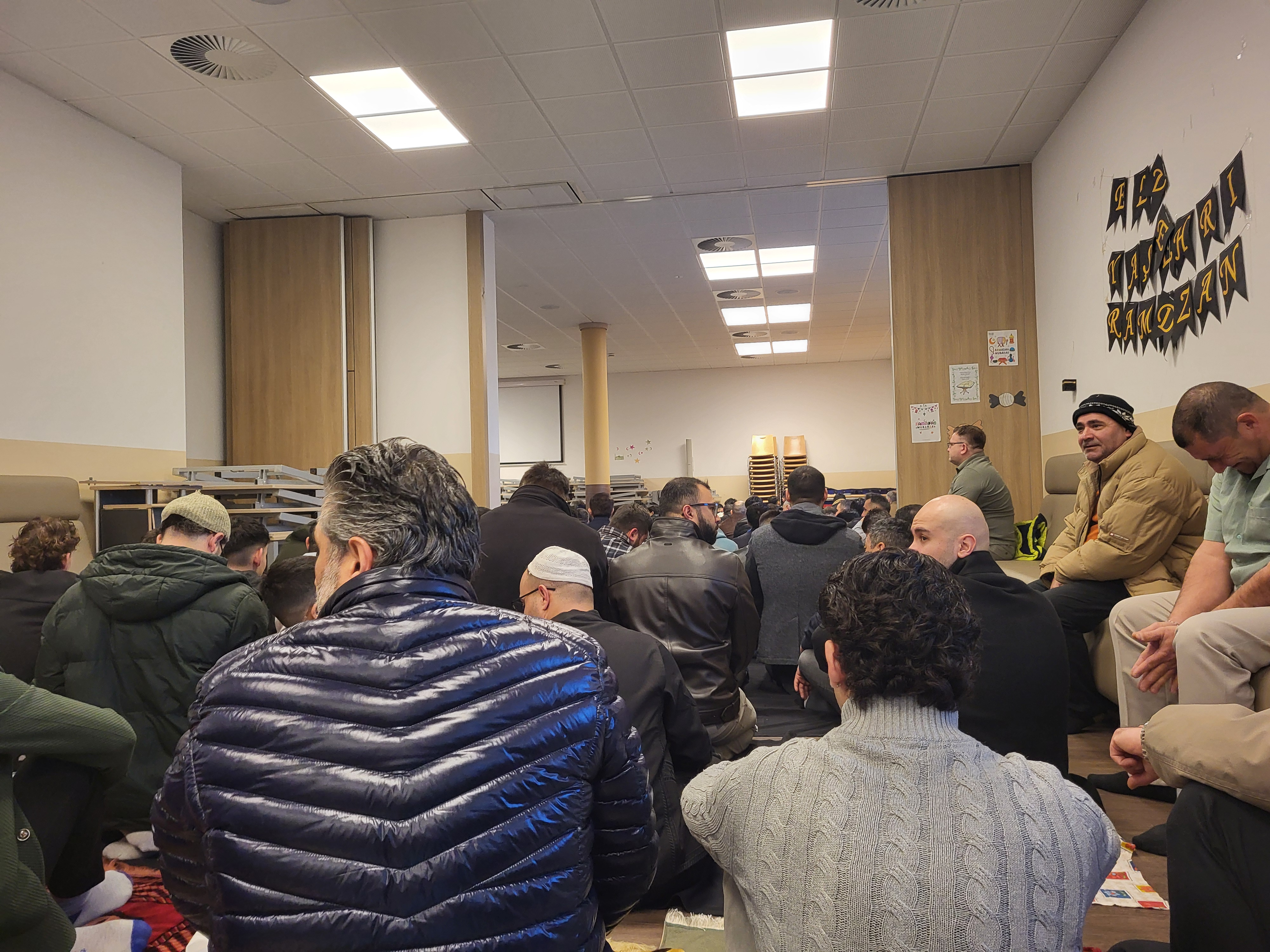
Prayers in the common room

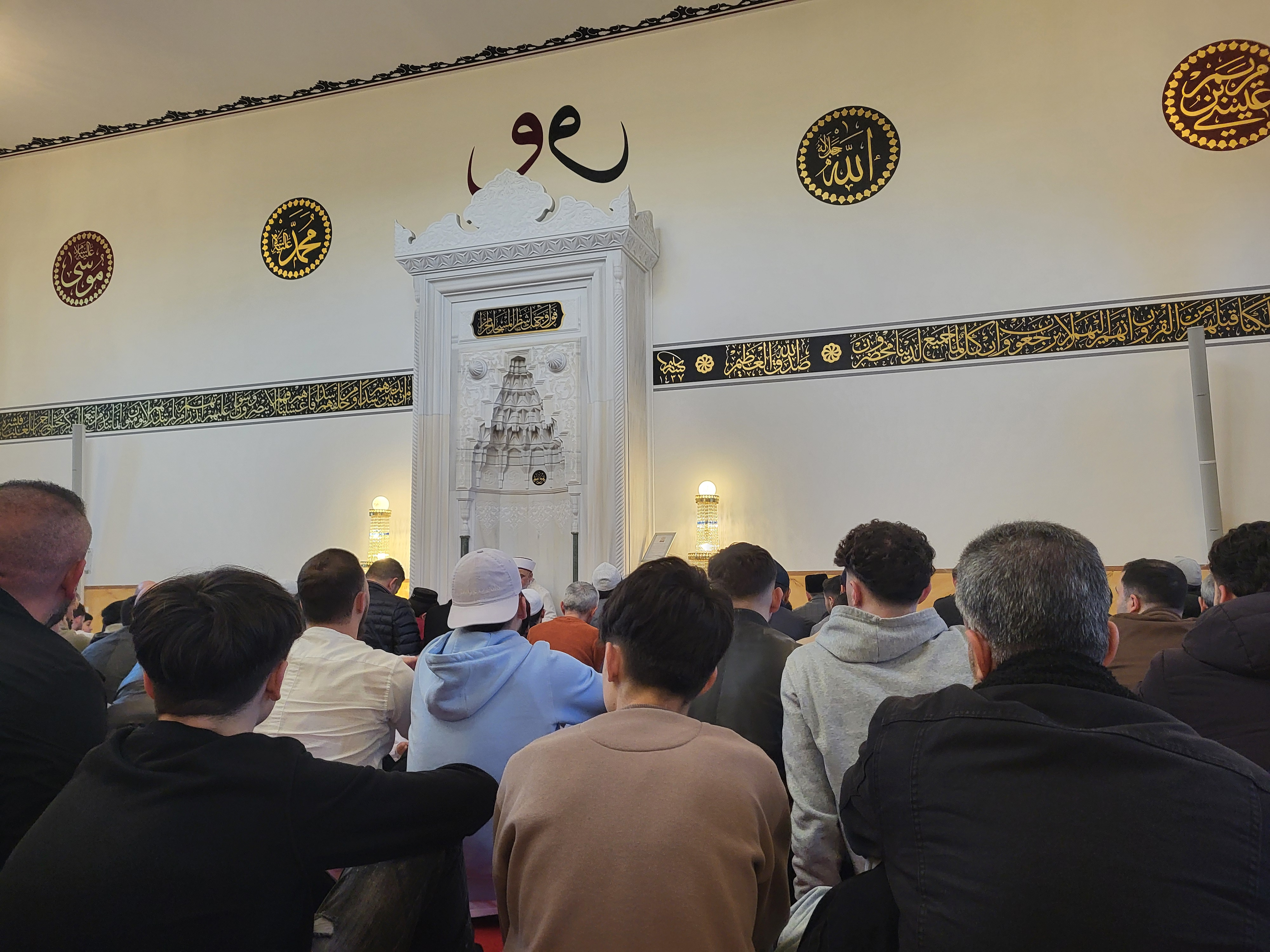
Bayram Namazı in the mosque

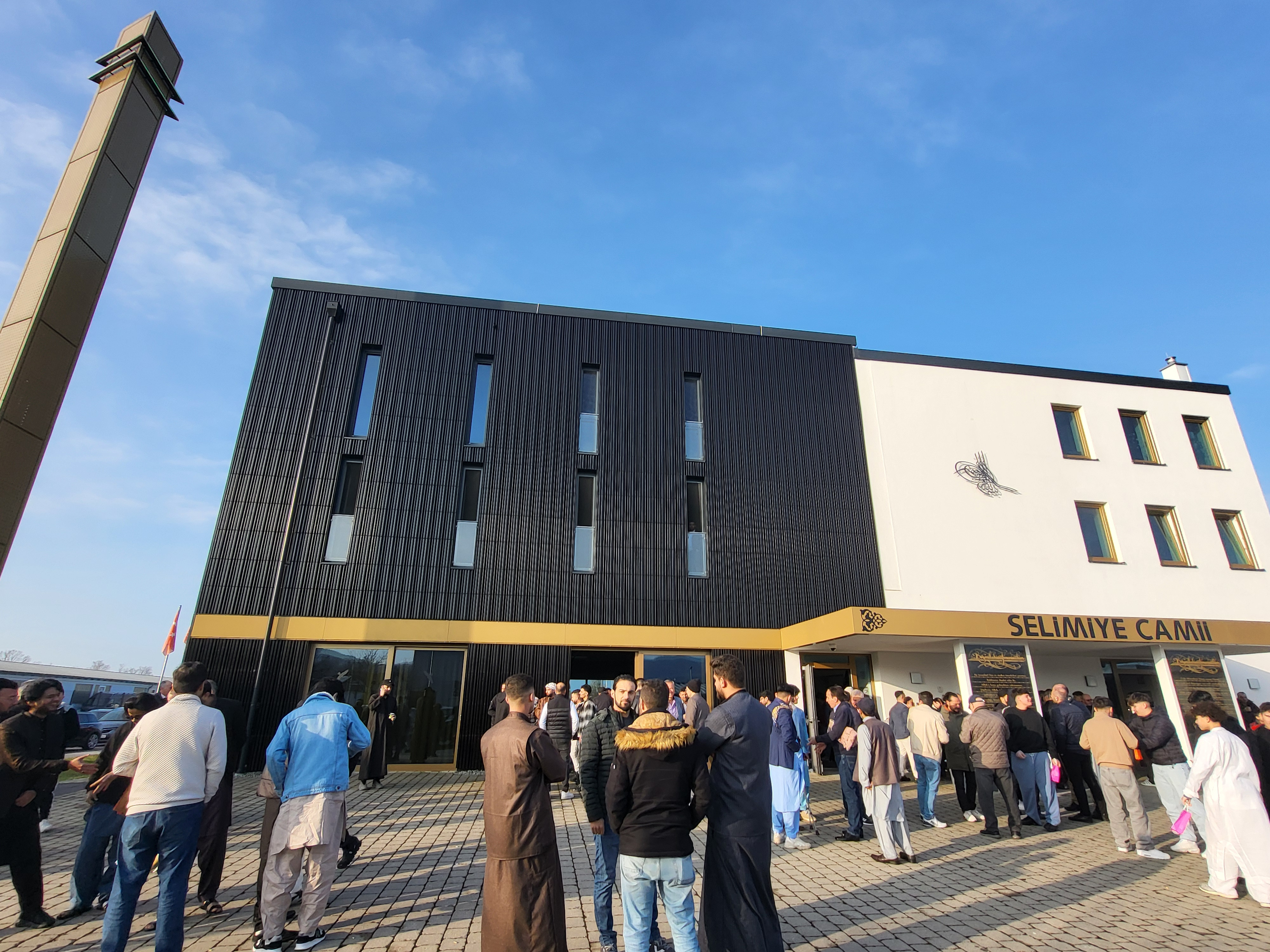
In front of the mosque

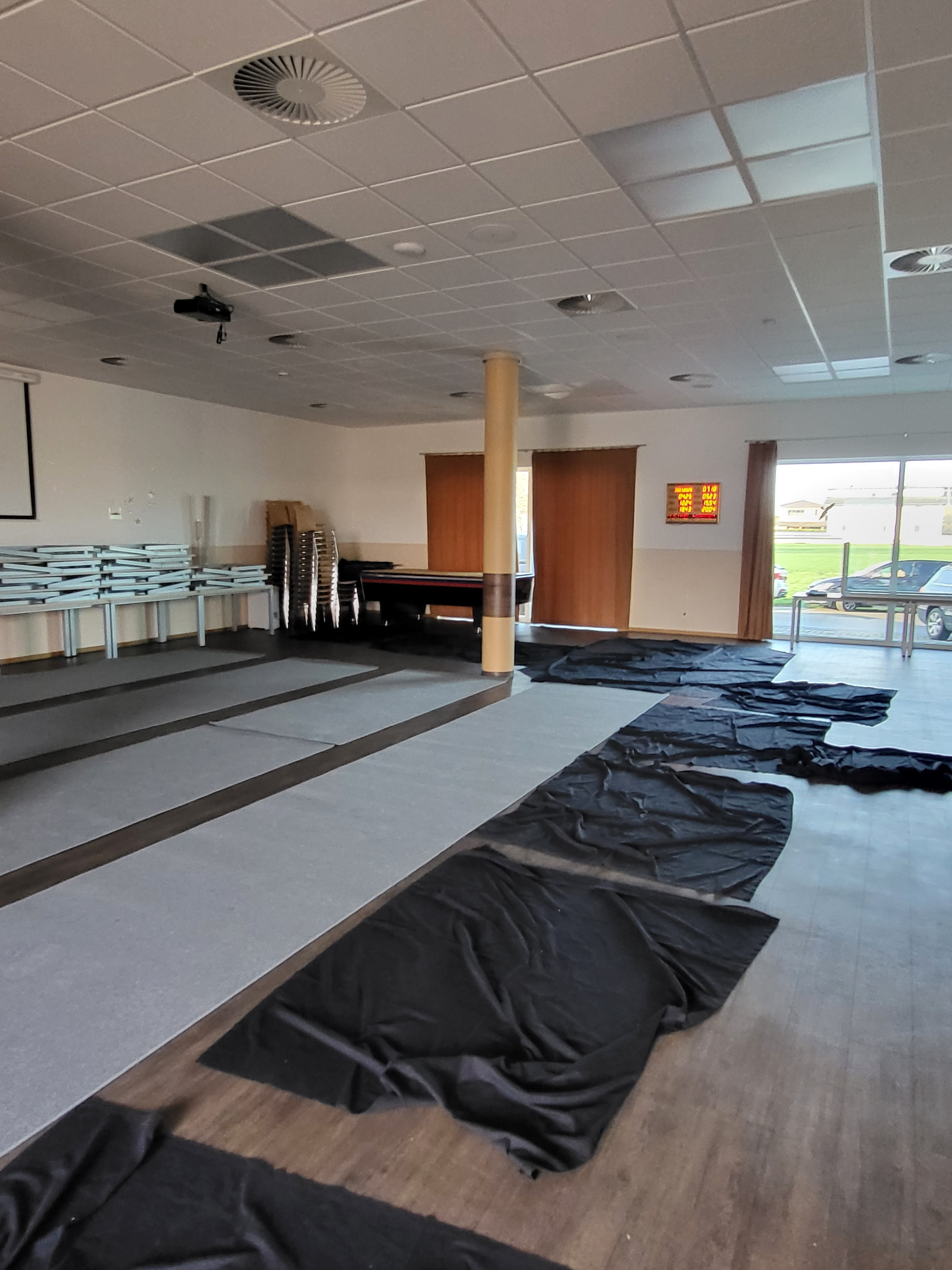
The common room

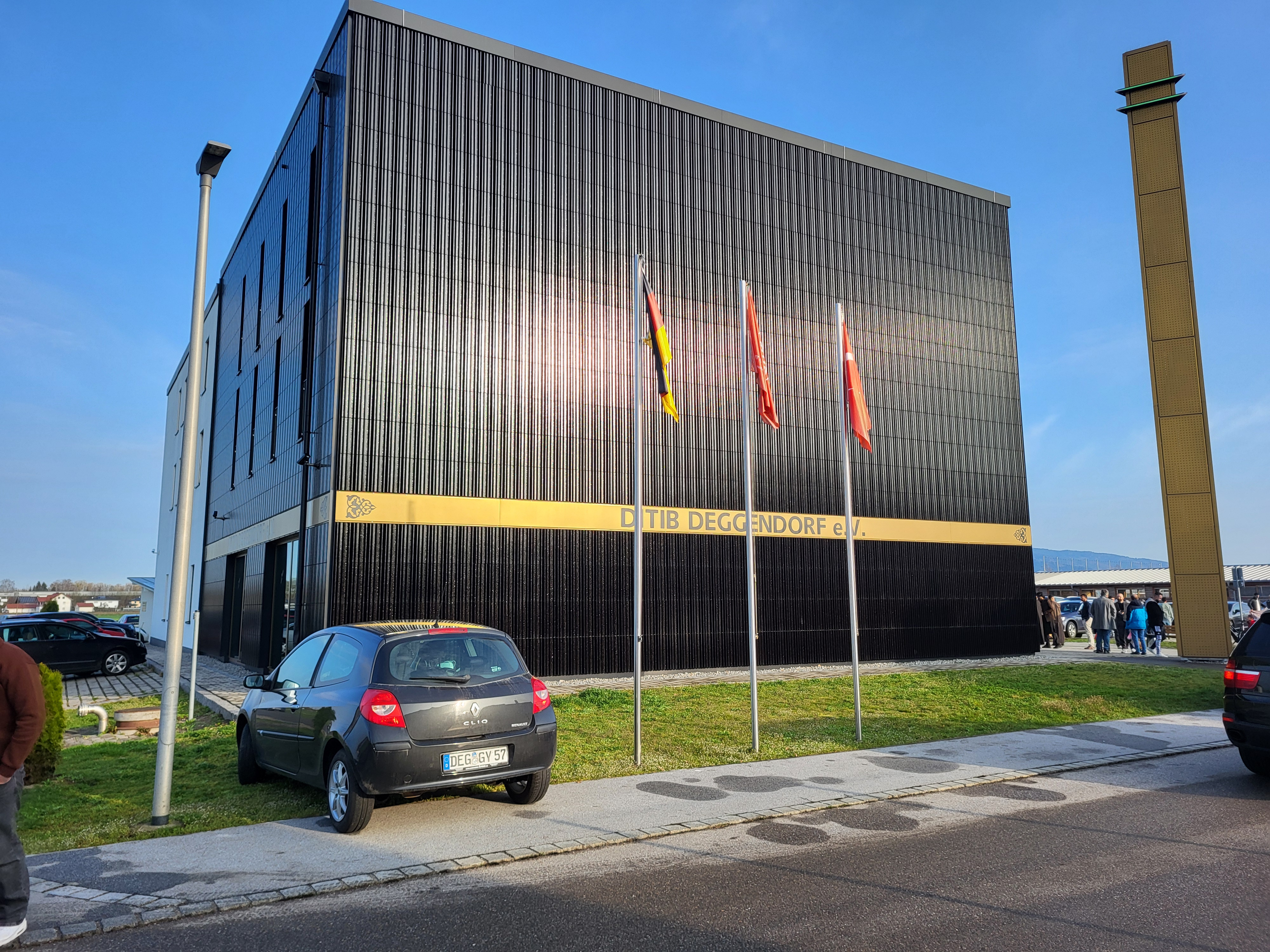
The three flags next to the mosque

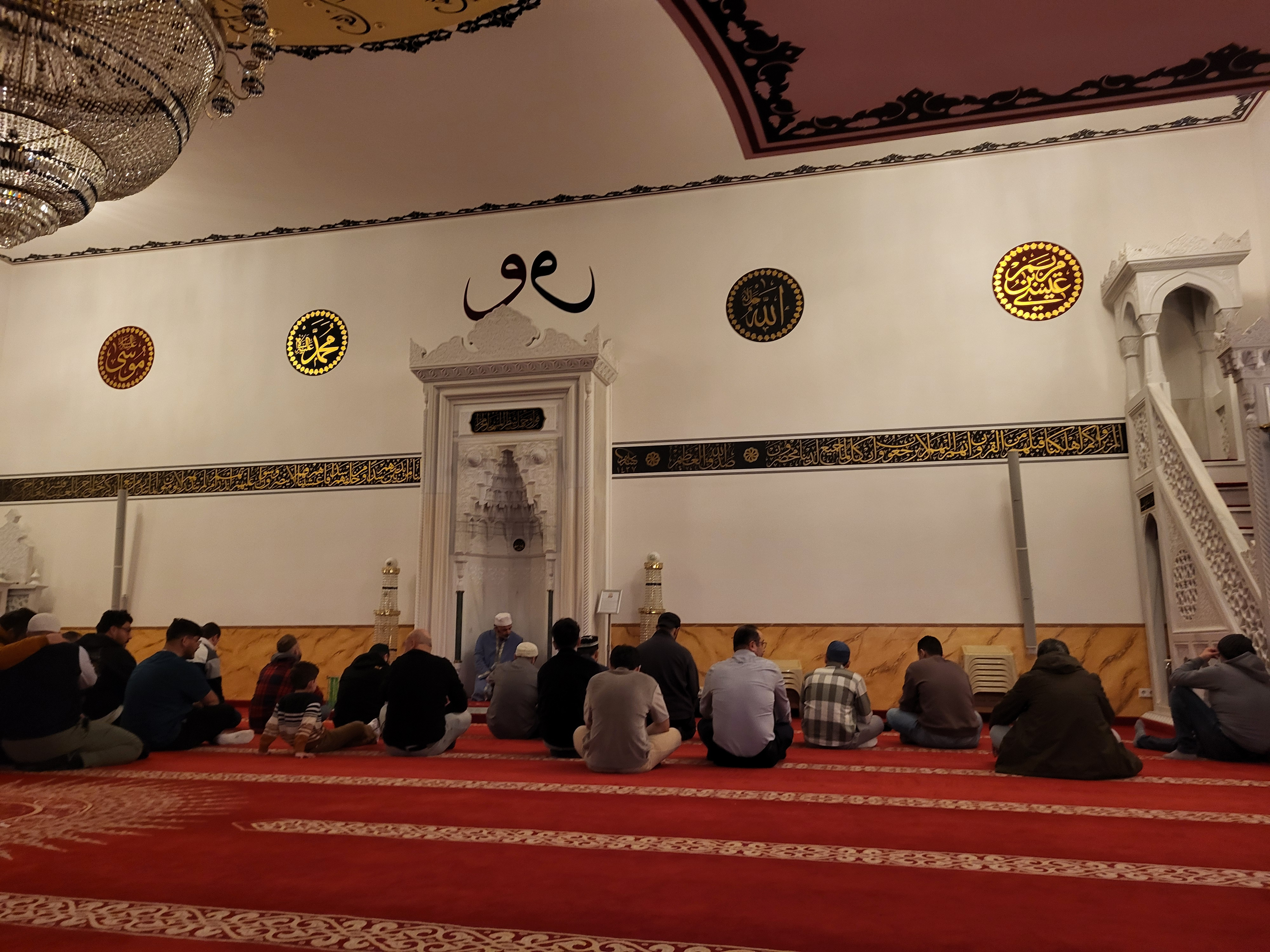
Taraweeh in the mosque

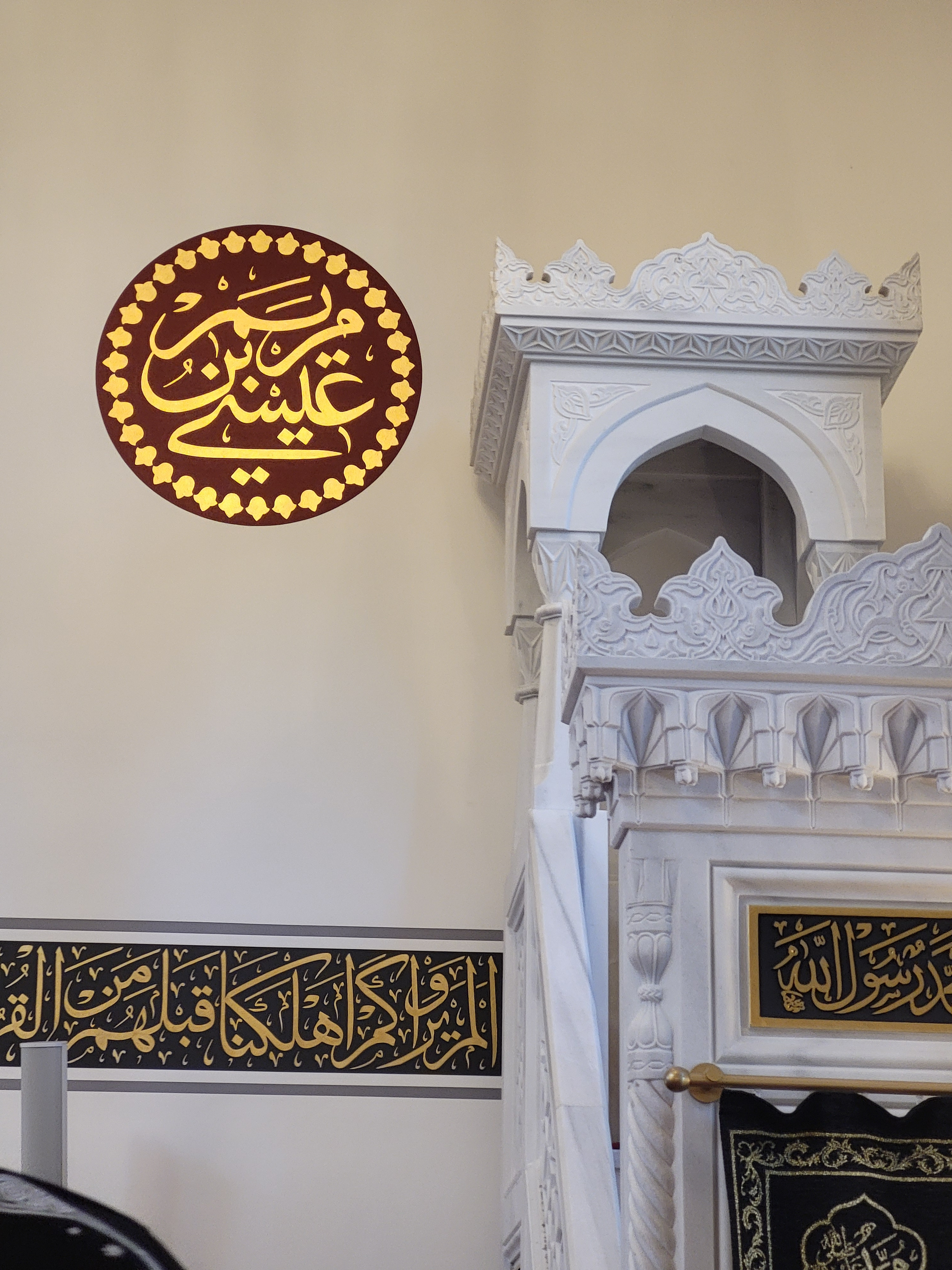
Calligraphy of prophet Isa next to the minbar

== See also ==
- Islam in Germany
- List of mosques in Germany
