= Duisburg Cathedral Mosque =

Mosque in Duisburg-Marxloh, Germany

- DİTİB-Merkez-Moschee
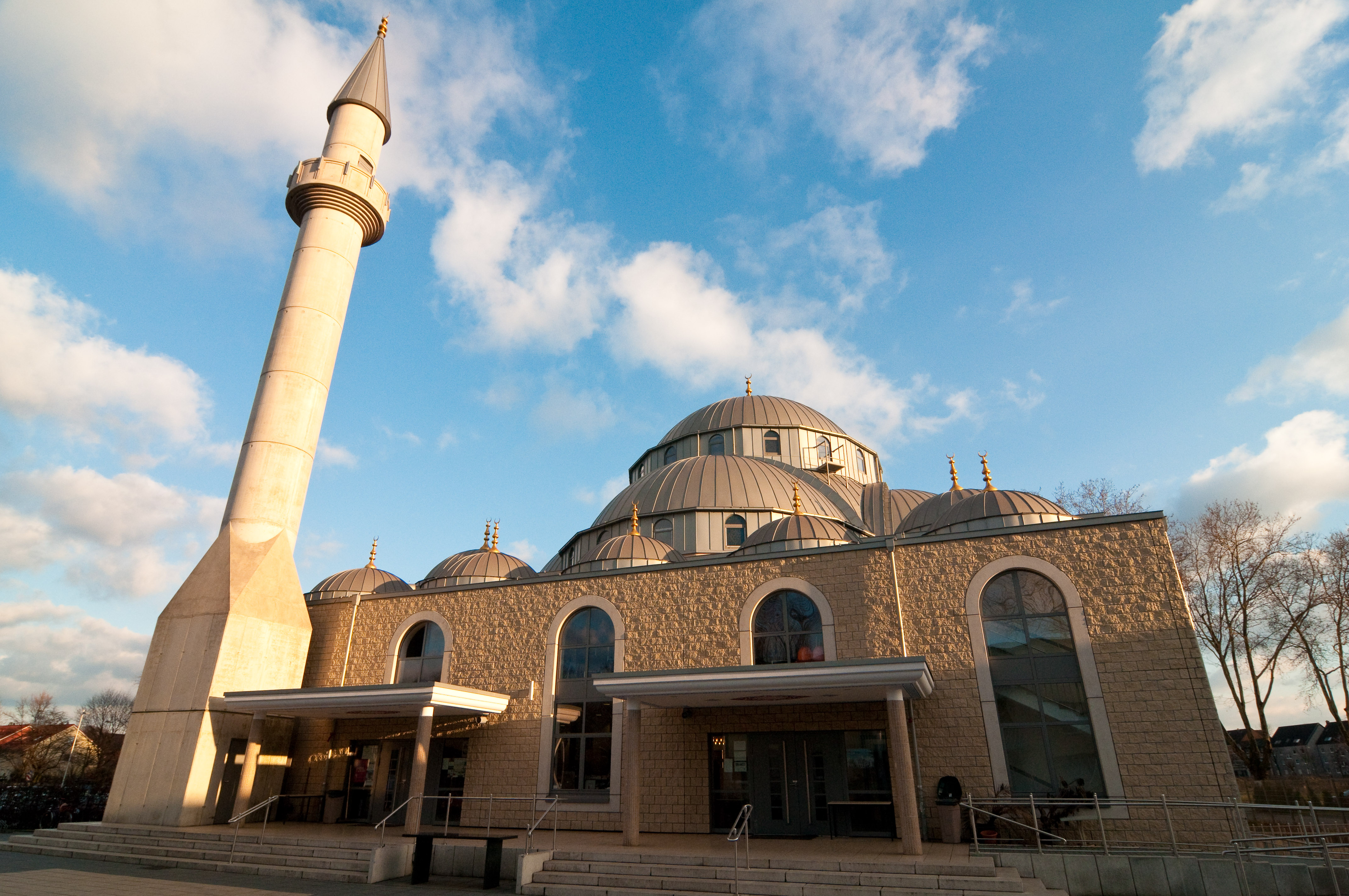

- Location of the mosque in North Rhine-Westphalia

Religion
- Affiliation: Sunni Islam
- Ecclesiastical or organisational status: Mosque; Community center; Madrasa
- Ownership: Diyanet İşleri Türk İslam Birliği
- Status: Active

Location
- Location: Duisburg-Marxloh, North Rhine-Westphalia
- Country: Germany
- Coordinates: 51°30′34″N 6°45′14″E

Architecture
- Architect: Cavit Sahin
- Type: Mosque
- Style: Neo-Ottoman
- Funded by: DİTİB; European Union; Government of North Rhine-Westphalia
- Groundbreaking: 2004
- Completed: 2008
- Construction cost: €7.5 million

Specifications
- Capacity: 1,200 worshippers
- Dome: 1
- Dome height (outer): 23 m (75 ft)
- Minaret: 1
- Minaret height: 34 m (112 ft)

Website
- ditib-du.de (in German)

The Duisburg Cathedral Mosque (German: DİTİB-Merkez-Moschee) is a mosque, Islamic cultural center, and madrasa, located in Duisburg-Marxloh, North Rhine-Westphalia, Germany. Completed in 2008 with capacity for 1,200 worshippers, it was the largest mosque in Germany until the Cologne Central Mosque was completed in 2017 with capacity to accommodate 1,200 worshippers. The mosque has a community center and a madrasa. The initiator of the mosque in Duisburg was the local Muslim community. The mosque's 23-metre-high (75 ft) silver dome and 34-metre-high (112 ft) minaret are unique features of the city skyline.

== History ==
Located in the Ruhr region, Duisburg is notable for its ferrous metallurgy and mechanical engineering. A significant part of the population of Duisburg are emigrants. According to 2015 census data, approximately 64% of emigrants living in Duisburg were ethnic Turks. Most of the Turkish emigrants came to Germany in the 1960s as guest workers, and they performed low-paid and physically hard work that the local Germans did not want to do. According to a University of Duisburg-Essen 2014 study on the integration of immigrants into German society, Turkish residents of Duisburg were the least integrated into German society.

After Berlin, Duisburg is home to the second largest Turkish community in Germany. The area of Marxloh, where the mosque was built, resembles Turkish cities: signs are in Turkish, the Turkish population prevails.

Most of the Turkish migrants in Duisburg today are employed in trade. They open Turkish restaurants, Turkish cafes and eateries in the city, the so-called Dönerbuden (German: Dönerbude — doner kebab eatery).

The construction of a mosque in Duisburg was initiated by Muslim women with the support of Laila Ezmal, the authorized representative of the city magistrate for the integration of migrants.

== Architecture ==
Designed by Cavit Sahin in the Neo-Ottoman style, the mosque was opened on 26 October 2008. It has a 23-metre-high (75 ft) silver dome and a 34-metre-high (112 ft) minaret. Inside the mosque there is a prayer hall for 1,200 people, a community center and a school. The construction cost of the mosque was approximately €7.5 million (£6 million), about half was funded by the European Union and North Rhine-Westphalia, the other part by the Diyanet İşleri Türk İslam Birliği (abbreviated as DİTİB).

The interior of the mosque is richly decorated with gold, turquoise, red and white paintings, and the room is illuminated by golden chandeliers. The mosque was named «Muradiye». At the opening of the mosque, the Prime Minister of North Rhine-Westphalia Jürgen Rüttgers delivered a speech to invited representatives of the German and Turkish public. Ali Bardakodlu, president of Turkey's highest religious body, officially opened Germany's largest mosque (at that time). The media noted that the opening of the mosque in Duisburg, unlike some other German cities, took place in a calm atmosphere.

The Muslim community of the city is considered quite liberal. She takes part in ecumenical meetings with representatives of Christian churches and hopes that the new mosque will become «the center of intercultural and interreligious dialogue». At the opening ceremony of the mosque, Mehmet Ozay, head of the DİTİB Union in Marxloh, said: "We have nothing to hide, so it’s time to say goodbye to our mosques that were hidden in the backyard."

== Gallery ==
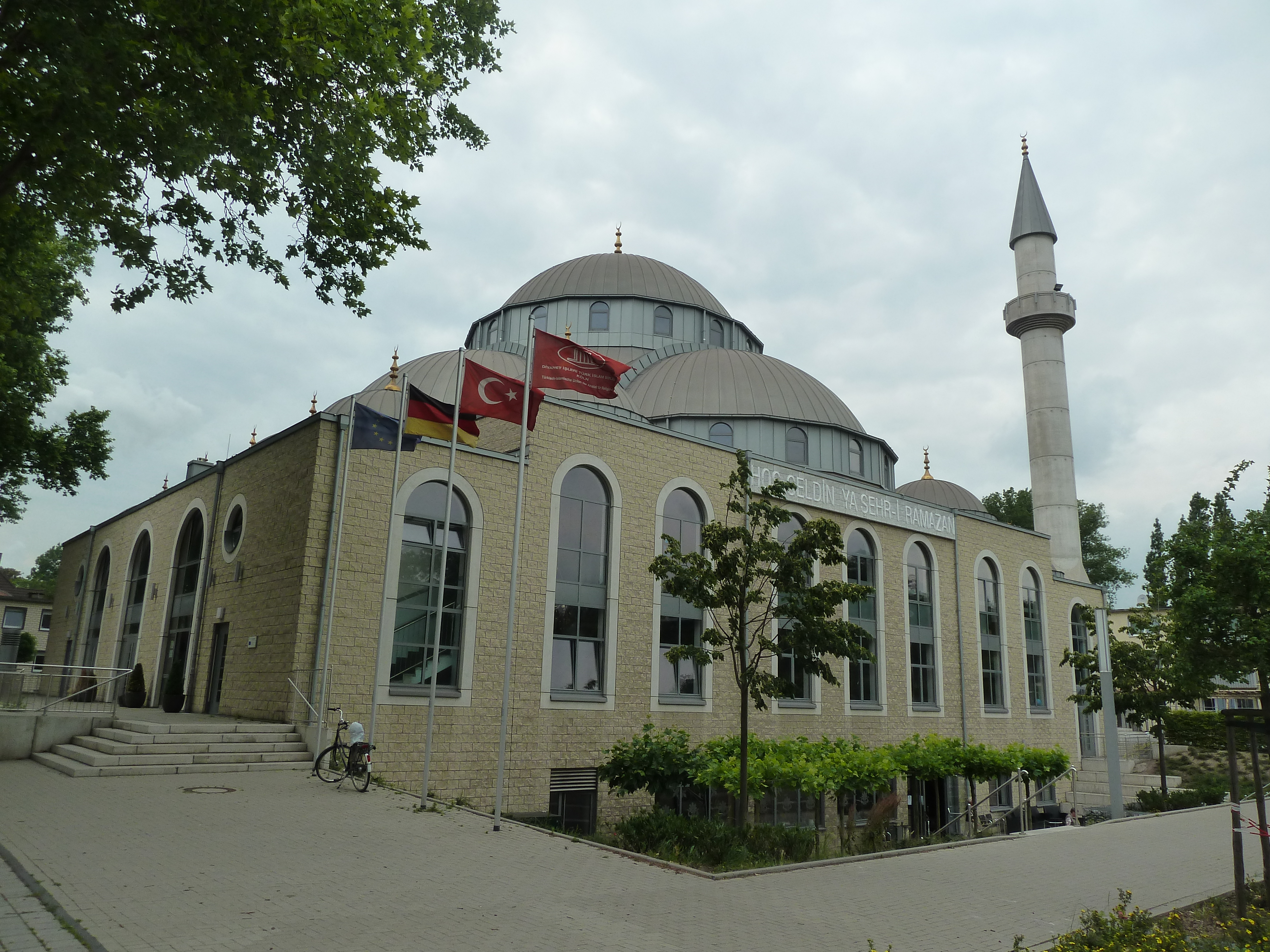
The mosque dome and minaret

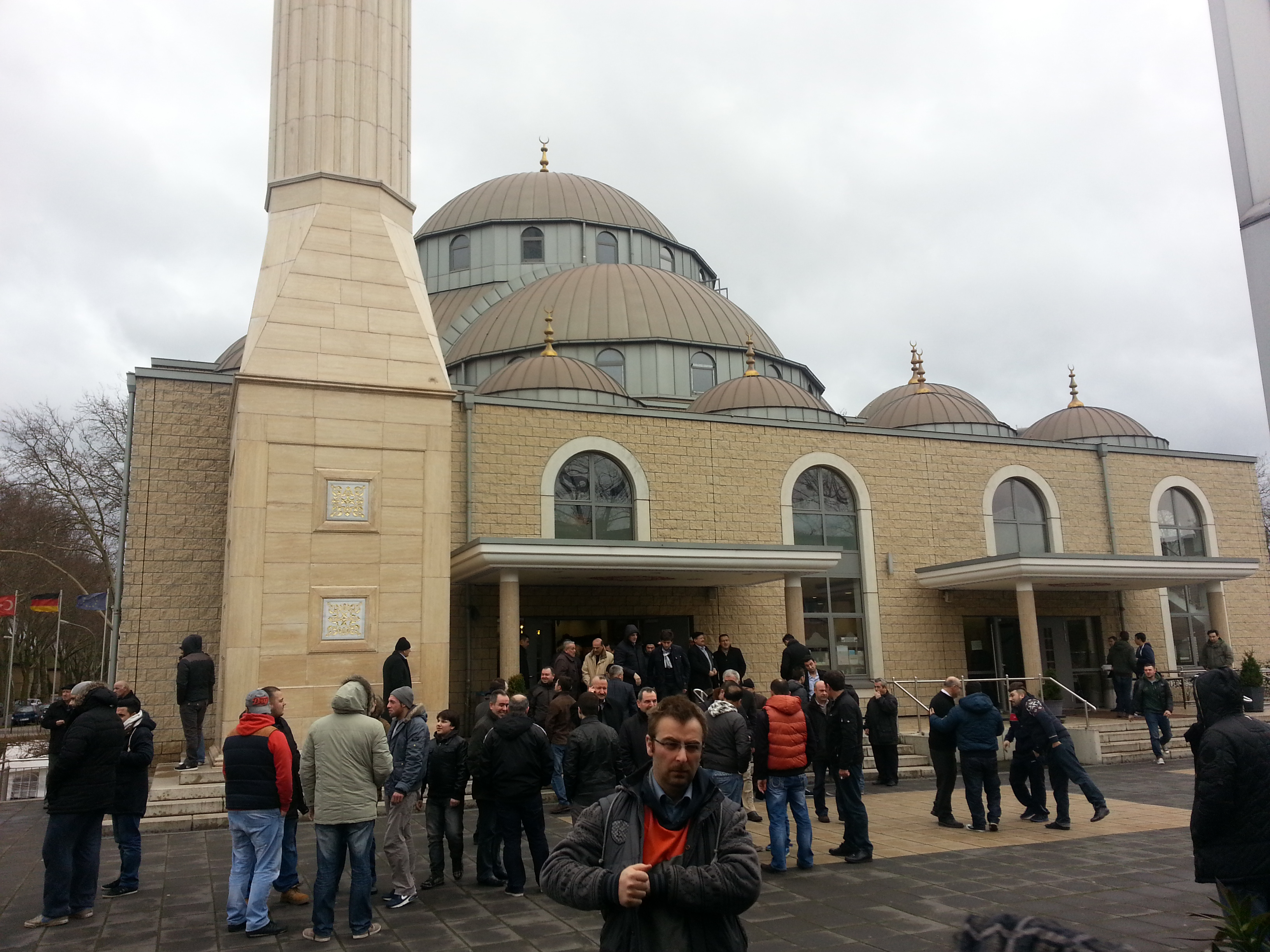
Central entrance to the mosque

== See also ==
- Islam in Germany
- List of mosques in Germany
