= Baitul Huda Mosque, Usingen =

Mosque in Usingen, Hesse, Germany

Baitul Huda Mosque
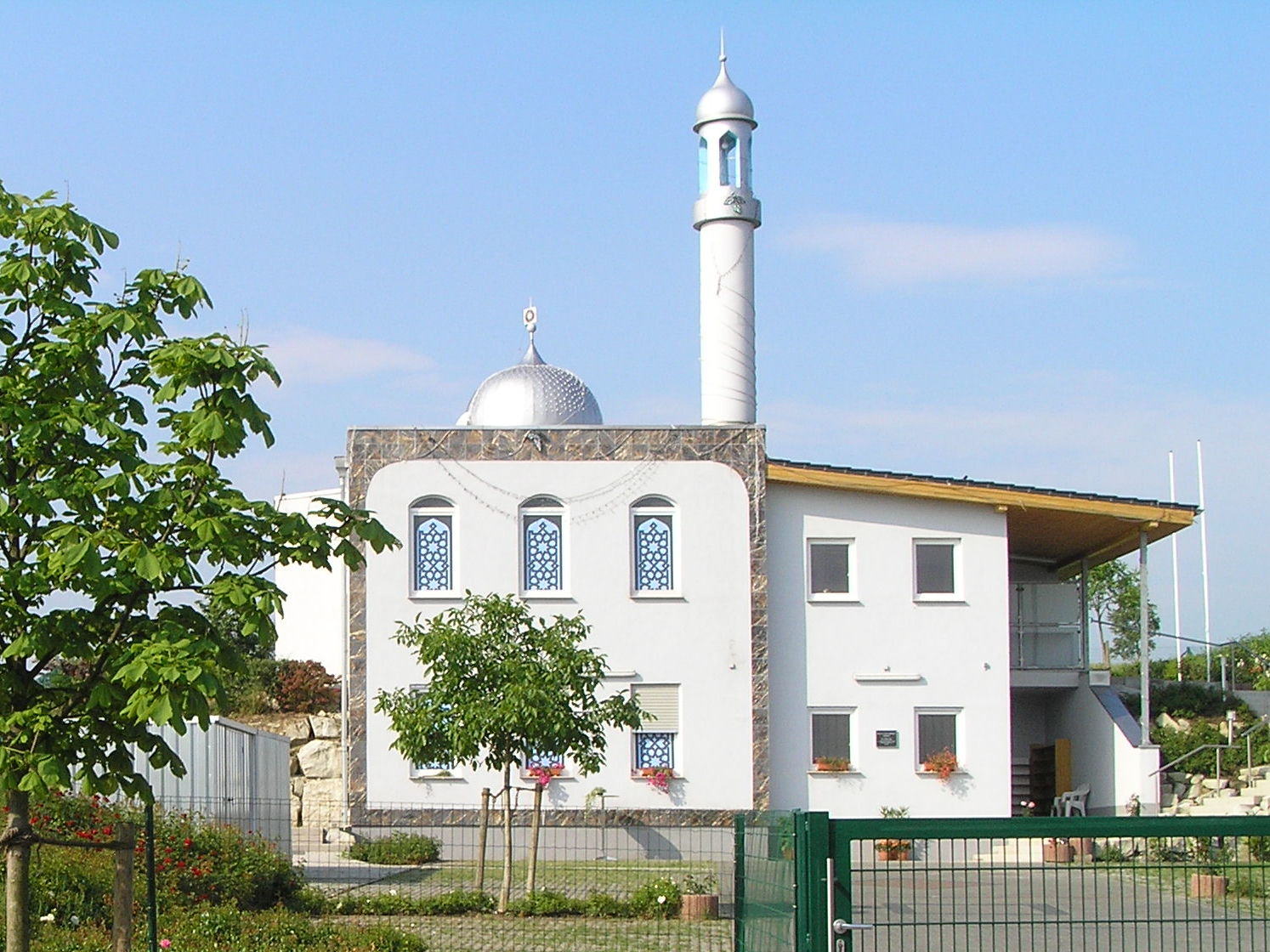

- Location of the mosque in Hesse

Religion
- Affiliation: Ahmadiyya Islam
- Ecclesiastical or organizational status: Mosque
- Governing body: Ahmadiyya Muslim Jamaat Deutschland K.d.ö.R.
- Status: Active

Location
- Location: Usingen, Hesse
- Country: Germany
- Interactive map of Baitul Huda Mosque
- Coordinates: 50°19′57″N 8°31′12″E

Architecture
- Type: Mosque
- Completed: 2004

Specifications
- Dome: 1
- Minaret: 1
- Minaret height: 14 m (46 ft)

Website
- baitul-huda.de (in German)

The Baitul Huda (transl. House of Guidance; Urdu: بیت الہدیٰ, romanized: Baīt al-Hudā) is a mosque located in Usingen, in the state of Hesse, Germany. The mosque was inaugurated on September 7, 2004, by Mirza Masroor Ahmad and is administered by the Ahmadiyya Muslim Jamaat Deutschland K.d.ö.R..

Its two prayer rooms are 77 square metres (830 sq ft) each; and the community in Usingen has 160 members.

The mosque was partially burned in the morning of December 23, 2004. Many residents in Usingen made donations for the reconstruction of the mosque; after the reconstruction, a tree in the entrance was planted as a sign of friendship. The incendiarism never was clarified.

== See also ==
- Ahmadiyya in Germany
- Islam in Germany
- List of mosques in Germany
- List of Ahmadiyya buildings and structures in Germany
