= Ahmadiyya in Germany =

Islamic movement

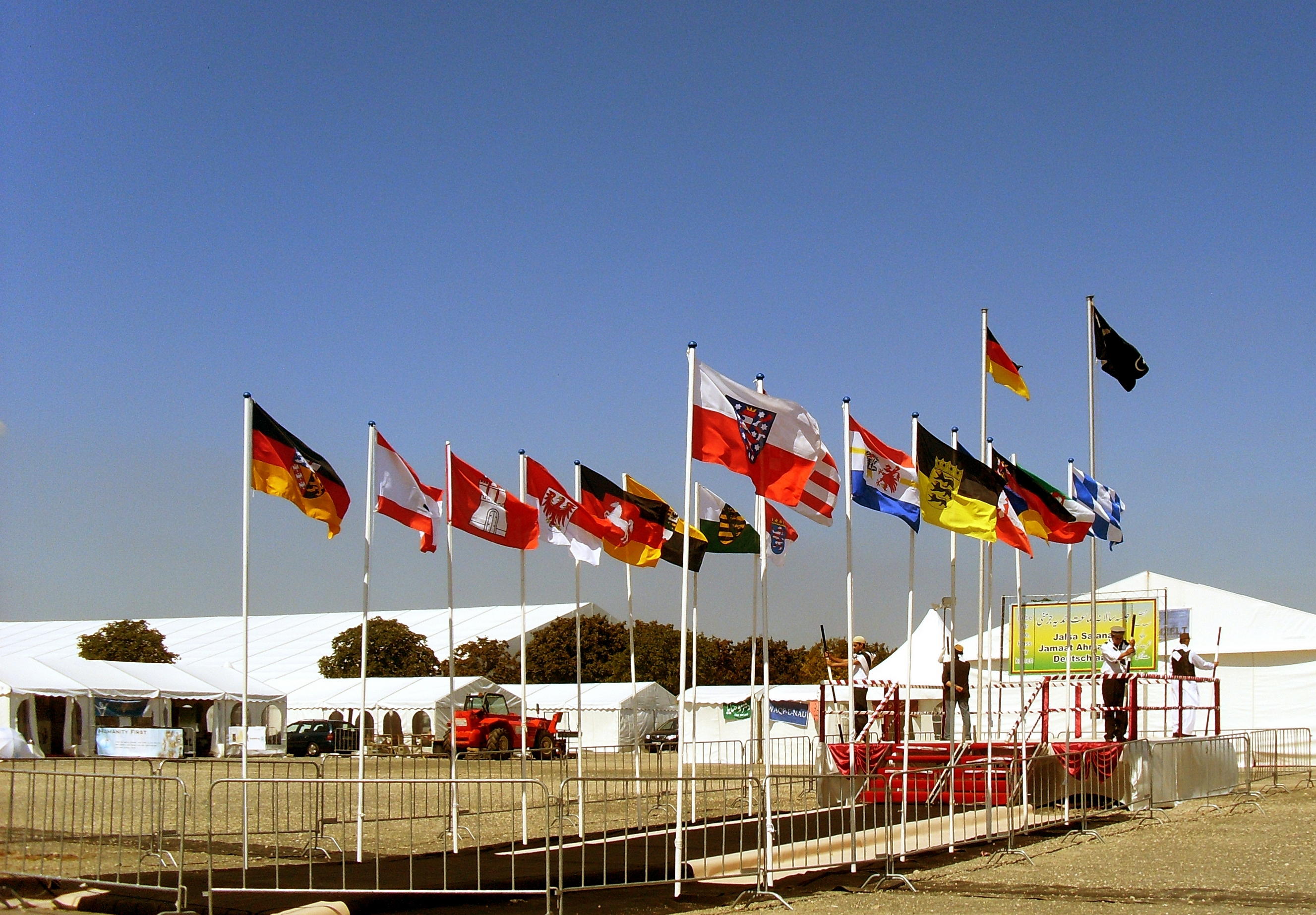
The Ahmadiyya flag and the German flags at the 2009 German Annual Gathering

The Ahmadiyya are movement that comprise a minority of Germany, numbering some 35,000–45,000 adherents and found in 244 communities as of 2013.

== History ==
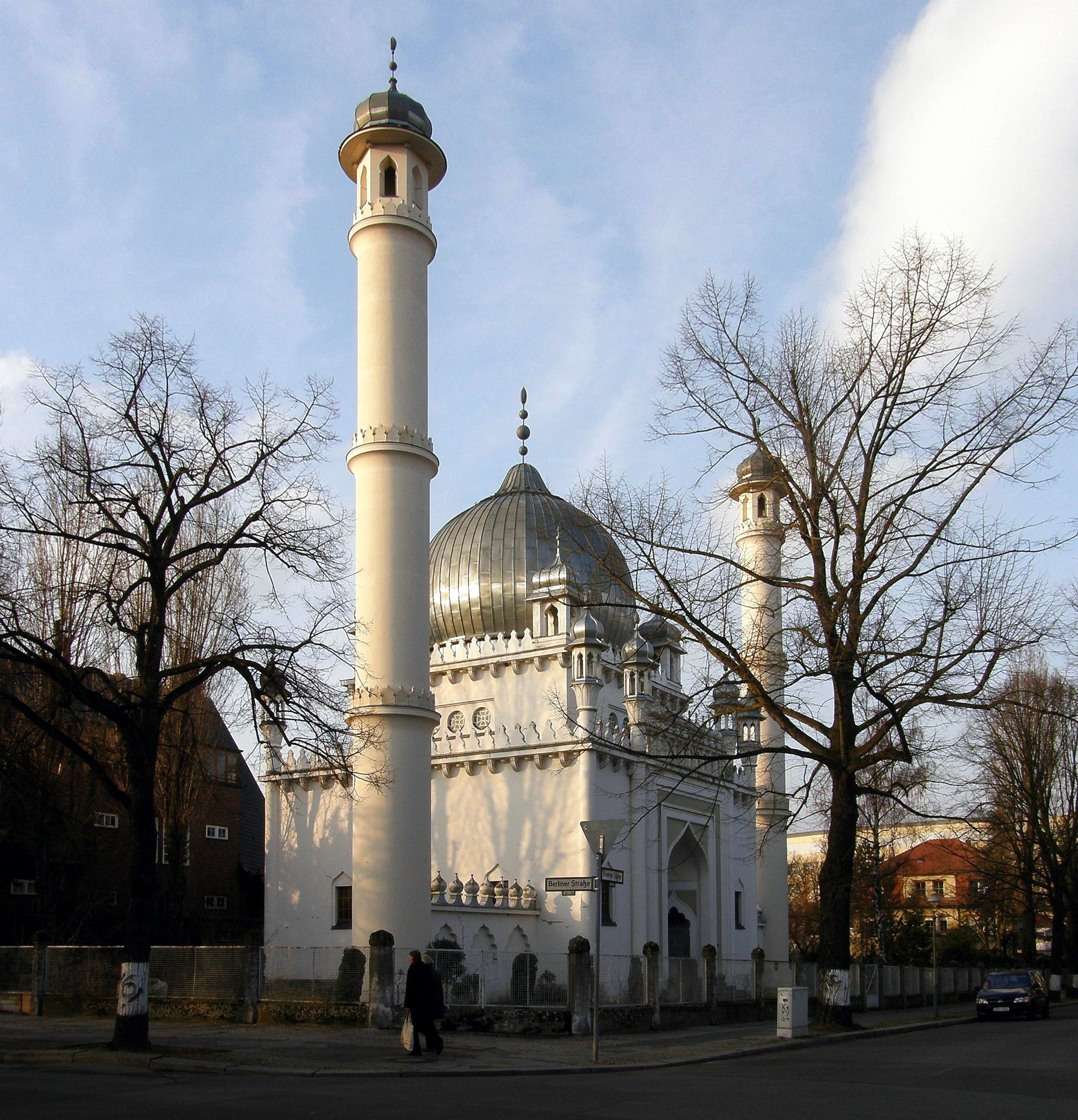
The Berlin Mosque in 2008

The Ahmadis were one of the earliest Muslim communities to have been established in Germany and built the first central mosque, the Wilmersdorfer Moschee in Berlin-Wilmersdorf between 1923 and 1925. The mosque, run by the Ahmadiyya Anjuman Ishaat-i-Islam, was open to all Muslims, published the Moslemische Revue (Muslim Review) between 1924 and 1940, and its first Imam, Maulana Sadr-ud-Din, wrote the first German translation of the Quran in cooperation with the German convert Hugo Marcus. This translation was published in 1939. Organised activities by the larger Ahmadiyya Muslim Community under the leadership of the Caliph began only after the Second World War when a centre was established. The movement has increasingly taken root in Germany since the 1980s through the arrival of South Asian immigrants and converts to Islam. The Ahmadi community in Germany consists mainly of Pakistani immigrants with a relatively small number of native German converts. Significant communities exist in Baden-Württemberg, Lower Saxony, North Rhine-Westphalia, Hesse and Bremen. The Khadija Mosque in Berlin, designed and financed by Ahmadi Muslim women in Germany was opened in 2008.

== Acknowledgement with Church status in Germany ==
Historically, due to the Landeskirchen concept, the organizational setup of the churches in Germany has always been in close interaction with the state administration and mirrored the territorial patchwork. As a legacy of the Prussian education system, the various confessions in Germany (including in the meanwhile Jewish and secular bodies as well) have contributed to primary and secondary education in Germany and do so still. The Ahmadiyya community outstanding organizational setup mirrors that system and allowed the German Ahmadiyya community to be (2013) acknowledged as first Islamic community with the status of Körperschaft des öffentlichen Rechts as legal entity of public law. Ahmadiyya applied for the status just to be able to offer religious education in Hessian state schools, but is allowed now to maintain their own cemeteries and have their members funds being collected by the German state's church tax system. It has been deemed as historical milestone and German daily Die Welt titled the event with Islam is a part of Germany now, quoting a famous speech of former President Christian Wulff.

== Notable German Ahmadis ==
Prominent German Ahmadi Muslims include:

- Abdullah Wagishauser – Ameer (president) of the Ahmadiyya Muslim Community Germany
- Hadayatullah Hübsch – German writer and journalist
- Khola Maryam Hübsch – German writer and journalist, daughter of Hadayatullah

== See also ==
- Islam in Germany
- Ahmadiyya in the United Kingdom
- Ahmadiyya by country
