= Ahmadiyya in Nigeria =

Islamic movement

Ahmadiyya is an Islamic branch in Nigeria under the caliph in London. Members of the organization are predominantly from Western Nigeria.

As part of its social service scheme, the movement has built up to ten schools and two hospitals in located in Apapa and Ojokoro, Lagos.

== History ==
=== Establishment ===
The [[[Ahmadiyya|Ahmadiyya Movement]] was founded in British India by Mirza Ghulam Ahmad, an Islamic reformist and mystic, who in 1891 claimed that he was a prophet, mujaddid (“renewer”), and the Messiah or Mahdi anticipated by Muslims.unded in British India by Mirza Ghulam Ahmad, an Islamic reformist and mystic, who in 1891 claimed that he was a prophet, mujaddid (“renewer”), and the Messiah or Mahdi anticipated by Muslims.

The Ahmadiyya Movement was formally organized in Lagos in 1916 but there are several, though not contradictory, versions of how Ahmadiyya came to Nigeria. One account has it that in 1913, one school teacher called Hamid stumbled upon a copy of the Review of Religion, a journal founded by the Ahmadiyya Movement in Qadian and started communicating with them. Another version has it that one Lagos businessman, Alhaji Ali Fahm traveled to Egypt in 1914 and got copies of Ahmadiyya literature which he brought to Nigeria, after studying which he and some of his friends wrote to the headquarters of the Movement in Qadian to declare that intention of becoming members of the movement. Alhaji Imran Adewuyi Onibudo was one of those who claimed to have taken the bia’ah (oath of allegiance) in 1914.

Many pioneer members of the society were associated with the Muslim Literary Society in Lagos, headed by Muhammed Basil Agusto, a Lagosian of Afro-Brazilian heritage. Agusto had started a short-lived school for Muslims and had interest in creating awareness about Western education among the Muslim Jamaat. Between 1916 and 1919, Agusto was the focal point of the group, he published his own pamphlets to complement those he requested from Qadian and the movement's gatherings were predominantly held in his private residence. Agusto may have also influenced the entry of many Afro-Brazilians into the movement in 1919. In 1919, he was appointed its first president and was succeeded by Jibril Martin when Agusto traveled to London to earn a law degree. In London, he became acquainted with the Lahore faction, and he eventually left the Ahmadiyya movement. When he returned to Nigeria in 1924, he established his own group, the Islamic Society of Nigeria.

=== 1920 – 1940 ===
In the beginning, Ahmadi Muslims were challenged by orthodox Muslims, a cleric, Adamu Animashaun used his printing press to attack the movement, a sustained vitriol directed towards the Ahmadis was alleged to have caused an assault on members in 1921. Animashaun and other Muslims were found responsible for instigating hostilities against the Ahmadis and were handed three-month sentences in prison, thereafter physical confrontation against the members stopped.

Among members closing the gap in education between Christians and Muslims in Lagos was one of their unifying interests. Adherents of the movement were among the earliest Lagosians to embrace Western education, two prominent members, Jibril Martin and Mohammed Agusto are the pioneer Muslim lawyers from Nigeria while another member, Abdul Hamid Saka Tinubu was the earliest trained Muslim doctor in the country. To promote its interest in education, in 1922, the movement established a primary school in Elegbeta, Lagos Island, Lagos.

Prior to the establishment of the school, a request for an Ahmadi teacher from India was placed in 1921, Maulana Abdur Rahim Nayyar, a representative of the Ahmadiyya movement in colonial India and who was an associate of Ghulam Ahmad was sent to Nigeria as missionary in charge. Colonial authorities were initially suspicious about the presence of Nayyar within the fragile Muslim community in Lagos which had split into five groups, the Lemomu group, the Quranic group, the Ahmadis, Jamaat party, and the Ogunro group. Suspicions were doused after Nayyar gave an interview stating he was in Lagos to preach adherence to the customs written in the Quran and also to the laws of the colonial government. He delivered his first lecture at the non Ahmadi Shitta Bey mosque and was active in bringing in new members to the movement. Nayyar did not make inroads within the other factions with the exception of the Quranic group, primarily based in Okepopo and Aroloya. After an agreement to merge with Ahmadiyya, Imam Dabiri of the Quranic group was selected as Chief Imam. Dabiri was succeeded in the 1930s by Imam Ajose.

Nayyar's stay in Lagos coincided with the establishment of additional branches in Ebutte-Meta and Epe. Movement activities commenced in Yaba in 1921, and within two years, members had established missions in Ibadan, Kano and Zaria. Expansion into Ado-Odo, Otta, Ijede and Ondo was completed by the mid 1930s.

Between 1933 and 1940, internal wrangling caused a split within the mission into two factions. A group was loyal to Imam Ajose and another group was loyal to F. R. Hakeem a Pakistani and representative of the Khalifa who aspired to replace Imam Ajose as lead Imam. Unlike, Nayyar's mellow demeanor, Hakim was heavily involved in the affairs of the Ahmadi's and his presence caused dissension in the group. A faction surrounded Imam Ajose and sought some form of local autonomy while Hakeem wanted strict adherence to the Ahmadi doctrines. The Khalifa withdrew recognition of the Ajose group and in 1940, the Hakeem led Ahmadiyya Muslim Mission was formally inaugurated in the country with the support of the Khalifa. The Ajose group maintained the name, the Ahmadiyya Movement in Islam and the Hakeem group was launched with the name Ahmadiyya Muslim Mission. The Ahmadiyya Muslim Mission later came to represent the core of the Ahmadi's in Nigeria.

=== 1940 – 1970 ===
After the split, both groups gained members within the Yoruba Muslim communities and also among Muslims in Etsako, Edo State and in Nasarawa. In Egbado division, the support of a local produce merchant led to the establishment of a mission in Ilaro. A plot of land was acquired in the Sabo area of town and on the land a mosque was built to hold jumat services and Quranic lessons for children. Proselytizing activities of this group strengthened a young mission in Abeokuta.

A mission house located in Idumagbo was completed in 1945 and in 1951, the mission began distributing a weekly newsletter, The Truth, to proselytize the ideals of the movement.

=== 1970 – present ===
In 1970, Mirza Nasir Ahmad, the third Khalifa visited the country, he was hosted by in Lagos by General Gowon. Ahmad inaugurated a social service program to expand educational and medical facilities to be managed by the movement. He returned in 1980, this time not only meeting members in Lagos, Ilaro and Ibadan but members in other branches such as those in Benin and in Kano

In the 1970's, the Imam Ajose group further split with a section renamed Anwar ul Islam. Since the split, the majority of Ahmadis in Nigeria are predominantly members of the Ahmadiyya Muslim Mission, the faction loyal to the Khalifa's choice of Hakeem as amir in 1940.

In 1988, Mirza Tahir Ahmad, the fourth Khalifa visited the country, he appointed Abdul Rasheed Agboola as the first Nigerian Missionary in Charge.

== Organizational structure ==
The movement's governance structure is led by the Amir also known as the Missionary in Charge, he is assisted by six deputy Amirs, in addition, there is a national executive committee which is replicated in local circuits. Nayyar, the first amir and missionary in charge had a national executive committee in 1921. The national executive committee is composed of the Secretary-General, secretary in charge of Tabligh, auditor, treasurer and representatives of branches within the movement.

=== Auxiliaries in Nigeria ===
- Majlis Ansarullah
- Lajna Imaillah
- Majlis Khuddam
- Majlis Atfal
- Nasirat
- Ahmadi Muslim Students' Association

== See also ==
- Islam in Nigeria
