= Abdul Rahim Dard =

Writer, political activist (1894–1955)

Abdur Rahim Dard
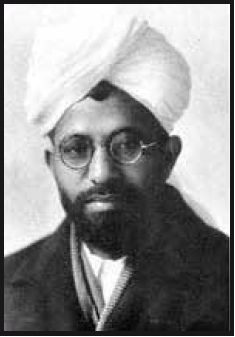
- Born: 19 June 1894; Ludhiana, Punjab, British India
- Died: 7 December 1955 (aged 61); Rabwah, Punjab, Pakistan
- Occupations: Muslim Missionary, Religious Scholar, and Pakistan Movement Activist
- Known for: Imam of historic Fazl Mosque and the relaunch of Jinnahs political career

Abdur Rahim Dard, known as A. R. Dard (19 June 1894 – 7 December 1955) was an Ahmadi Muslim writer, missionary, and political activist for the Pakistan Movement, who served as the Imam of the historic Fazl Mosque, the premier gathering place for Indian Muslims regardless of denomination in London. He is known for convincing Muhammad Ali Jinnah to return to British India and fight for the Pakistan Movement.

== Career ==
Dard was a speaker, Ahmadiyya missionary and a writer. He addressed many large audiences, most notably during the events of Jalsa Salanas, Interfaith Events, and Political Debates on Pakistan. He wrote many books both in English and Urdu, among them Life of Ahmad – Founder of the Ahmadiyya Movement (1948), a biography which covers the life of Mirza Ghulam Ahmad up to 1901, however, he was unable to complete the work. He also wrote a book The Islamic Caliphate (1938).

Dard met Muhammad Ali Jinnah in March 1933, (who getting utterly disappointed from Indian Politics had returned to England and started his legal practice there), and tried to convince him to return to India being direly needed by the Indian Muslims. Dard told Jinnah that Jinnah's abandonment of politics in British India him a "traitor" for the Muslim cause. To symbolize Jinnah's return to the political scene, Dard arranged at the Fazl Mosque in London in April 1933, a lecture titled The Future of India which was presided over by Sir Nairne Sandeman in which Jinnah criticized the recent White Paper on the Indian Constitutional Reform and argued for self-government by Indians.

With the consensus of the All India Kashmir Committee, Dard became its Secretary. He served the Jama'at as Nazir Sadr Anjuman Ahmadiyya for many years, and accompanied Khalifatul Masih II.

== Religion and Personal life ==
Dard was the Private Secretary to Khalifatul Masih II from 1920 to 1924 and accompanying him to Damascus, Palestine, Egypt, Italy and France ultimately reaching England on 22 August 1924 for the Wembley's Conference of Living Religions 1924, and was appointed as the missionary in Charge of the London Mission. He served as an Ahmadiyya missionary in England for a total of 10 years in two terms. The Fazl Mosque in London, was built in 1926 under his supervision. He finally returned to Qadian in 1938.He had two wives and was the father of fourteen children, notably Muhammad Isa Dard, (married to Mansoora Qayyum eldest daughter of Mian Abdul Qayyum) who died in a car crash on the Islamabad-Lahore Motorway.

Dard was Imam of the Fazl Mosque in London twice, from 1924 to 1928 and then again from 1931 till 1938.

== Bibliography ==
- A. R. Dard (1938). The Islamic caliphate. London.
- A. R. Dard (1948). Life of Ahmad, Founder of the Ahmadiyya Movement. Tabshir Publication.
