= Mubarak Sani case =

Pakistani court case

The Mubarak Sani case (Urdu: مبارک ثانی کیس) involves Mubarak Sani, a member of Ahmadiyya Community and the Government of Punjab, Pakistan. The case revolves around blasphemy allegations linked to Sani's publication and distribution of the Tafsir-i Saghir, an interpretation of the Quran.

== Background ==
On 6 December 2022, a complaint was filed by Muhammad Hassan Maavia, General Secretary of the Tahaffuz Khatm-e-Nabuwat Forum, leading to the registration of a case against five individuals, including a woman from the Ahmadiyya community, at the Chenab Nagar Police Station in Chiniot, Punjab. The First information report (FIR) pertained to an event held on 7 March 2019, at the Madrasatul Hifz Aisha Academy, where Tafseer-e-Sagheer was allegedly distributed to 30 boys and 32 girls. This distribution was claimed to contravene Articles 295-B, 295-C of the Constitution and the Quran Act, prompting calls for legal action against the organisers.

Although not initially named in the FIR, Mubarak Ahmad Sani was arrested on 7 January 2023. He was later charged under the Punjab Holy Quran (Printing and Recording) (Amendment) Act, 2021. Subsequent bail applications were denied by both the Additional Sessions Judge and the Lahore High Court. However, upon reaching the Supreme Court of Pakistan, a decision was rendered on 6 February 2024, granting immediate bail to Mubarak Ahmad Sani against a bond of five thousand rupees.

== Verdict ==
On 6 February 2024, a Supreme Court bench comprising Qazi Faez Isa and Musarrat Hilali adjudicated the appeal. The Court found that Sani's continued detention violated his constitutional rights under Articles 9 and 10A, concerning personal liberty and the right to a fair trial, as he had already served the maximum sentence of six months applicable for the charges.

Following the bail grant, misunderstandings and false information spread via social media led to nationwide unrest and criticism of Chief Justice Isa. In response, the Punjab government filed a review petition under Article 188 of the Constitution of Pakistan, requesting a reevaluation of the judgment, particularly concerning the interpretation of Article 20, which pertains to religious freedom.

The Supreme Court, with a three-member bench including Irfan Saadat Khan and Naeem Akhtar Afghan, held hearings and consulted religious groups and the Islamic Ideological Council.

On 24 July 2024, the Court upheld its earlier ruling, with Justice Naeem Afghan announcing the judgment authored by Chief Justice Isa. The decision reaffirmed that while the right to religious freedom is fundamental, it is subject to legal, moral, and public order constraints. The ruling was in line with precedents set by the Federal Shariat Court.

On 22 August 2024, the Supreme Court of Pakistan, presided over by Chief Justice Qazi Faez Isa and a three-member bench, reviewed and ultimately upheld the bail previously granted to Mubarak Sani. During this hearing, the court agreed to remove paragraphs 7 and 42 from their earlier decision, following input from clergy representatives.

Paragraph 7 of the original decision noted that the mere citation of Section 295-B of the Pakistan Penal Code in the FIR does not automatically establish criminal responsibility under that section for the accused. Paragraph 42 stated that despite being declared non-Muslim, both Ahmadiyya groups are entitled under the constitution and laws to practice and preach their faith and express their beliefs, provided they do not publicly use Islamic terminologies or identify as Muslims.
