= Lajna Ima'illah =

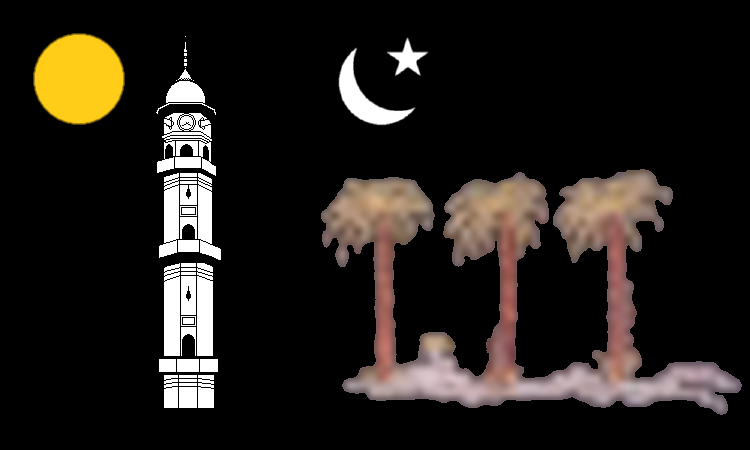
Flag of Lajna Imaillah

Lajna Ima’illah (Arabic: لجنہ اماء الله; lit. committee for the maids of Allah) is the women's auxiliary organization of the Ahmadiyya Muslim Community. It is for women above the age of 15. The organization was established in 1922 by Mirza Bashir-ud-Din Mahmud Ahmad, the second Caliph of the Community to give women a voice in the administrative affairs of the Community and a degree of independence. It is the largest of the auxiliary organizations within the Community.

Ahmadi Muslim women have their own Majlis-e-Amla (Cabinet/executive body) which consists of women responsible for finances, education, health and fitness, social service activities, publications, etc. of the organization. Local branches of the Lajna Ima’illah are linked with regional and national management and each national branch is headed by a Sadr (President). Although the Sadr is usually elected, she may be appointed by the Caliph. Four Ahmadi mosques have been built solely by donations from Ahmadi women as of 2008 and Ahmadi women architects have participated in their design and construction. The Lajna also participate, through female representatives, in the Majlis-ash-Shura (advisory council).

A magazine, Misbah was introduced in 1926 solely for the women of the Community. Despite scarce financial resources, Nusrat Girls High School was established in 1928 in Qadian so that girls could have access to education and in 1951, a women's college was established in Rabwah.

== Motto ==
No nation can progress without educating their women.

== Pledge ==
Members of Lajna Ima'illah usually reaffirm their pledge in formal gatherings by reciting out loud the shahadah followed by its translation in the native language of the country and then the rest of the pledge is read out in the native language.

 أَشْهَدُ أنْ لَّا إِلٰهَ إِلَّا اللهُ وَحْدَهُ لَا شَرِيْكَ لَهُ وَأشْهَدُ أنَّ مُحَمَّدًا عَبْدُهُ وَرَسُوْلُهُ

Transliteration: Ašhadu an lā ilāha illallāhu waḥdahu lā šarīka lahu, wa ašhadu anna muḥammadan ʿabduhu wa rasūluhu.

Translation: I bear witness that there is no God except Allah, the One, without any partner. And I bear witness that Muhammad is His Servant and Messenger.

I affirm that I shall always be ready to devote my life, property, time and children for the cause of my faith and nation. I shall always adhere to the truth and shall always be prepared to make every sacrifice for the perpetuation of the Ahmadiyya Khilafat, Insha’Allah [God willing].

== Aims and Objectives ==
Lajna Ima’illa places a particular emphasis upon education and the moral upbringing of children. Among its aims are:

- To improve and enhance knowledge, whilst being focused on achieving high morals and spirituality.
- To serve the Community using pre-existing skills, including fundraising for local charities.
- To focus on upbringing of children, training and preparing them to spend their lives in accordance with the teachings of Islam.
- To promote unity and work together with patience and forbearance, overlooking each other’s shortcomings.
- To strive hard in the face of difficulties and challenges with fortitude and bravery.
- To plan to help the poor in a practical manner.

== Lajna Flag History ==
During the annual gathering of the community in December 1939, after hoisting the Ahmadiyya flag and the Khuddam-ul Ahmadiyya Flag, Khalifatul Masih II arrived in the Ladies section of the gathering and while reciting the prayer O our Lord, accept this from us for you are surely All-Hearing, All Knowing, hoisted the flag which would represent the women of the Ahmadiyya Jama’at (community). The flag pole was 35 feet high and the flag was 3 ¾ meters in length and 2 ¼ meters in width. In addition to the graphics of the Ahmadiyya flag, it had three date trees with a stream flowing underneath them. The flag was made of satin and its design was stitched with a machine using different color silk threads. The ladies were so enthusiastic on that day that they began shouting religious slogans freely. The slogans were initiated by a teacher named Memoona Sahiba. The wives of the Khalifa as well as the ladies belonging to the family of Mirza Ghulam Ahmad were gathered around him, including his mother and widow of Ghulam Ahmad, Sayyeda Nusrat Jahan Begum.

During the Partition of India, the original flag was transported from Qadian, India to Rabwah, Pakistan, the new headquarters of the community, however, it was misplaced during its transportation. Upon investigation it had been revealed that back in 1949 it was left behind in the train that was arriving from Lahore to Rabwah, and that it remained unconfirmed whether or not any attempt had been made to recreate it since. Despite all efforts to do so it was never recovered. In 1998, Amtul Quddus Sahiba, a former President of Lajna Pakistan, wrote to Khalifatul Masih IV seeking permission recreate the flag since detailed descriptions of the flag's design and dimensions were recorded and verifiable. Thus, It was recreated once again in 1999, with the permission of Khalfatul Masih who responded saying "Alright, recreate this flag once more". These instructions were carried out in the same year of 1999 and the Lajna Flag was recreated by Khursheed Anjum Sahiba. Also, during the same year this flag was hoisted at the Annual Lajna Ima'illah Pakistan Sports Tournament and continues to be used at Lajna functions all over the world.

== See also ==
- Ansarullah
- Khuddam-ul Ahmadiyya
