= Daily Al-Fazl =

Urdu newspaper, now published in England

Daily Al-Fazl (Urdu: روزنامہ الفظل) is one of the oldest dailies in the Indian subcontinent, an organ run by the Ahmadiyya Muslim Community. It was initiated by Mirza Basheer-ud-Din Mahmood Ahmad on June 18, 1913. The initial monetary responsibilities were fulfilled through donations by members of the community. The newspaper has been publishing the sermons, sayings and announcements of Ahmadiyya Caliphates for nearly a century. In Pakistan, the Al-Fazl was subject to the Pakistani law enforcement which forced the community to move their palace of from Pakistan to London and since 2015 it is not being published in Pakistan and has also shifted to Islamabad, Tilford in Surrey, England. it is the oldest ongoing Urdu newspaper.

== History ==
Founded in 1913 in Qadian, the newspaper was initially published weekly, then three times a week and then daily as of 1935. Until 1947, it was published from Qadian and then from Lahore up to 1954. Since then it is published from Rabwah.

Mirza Basheer-ud-Din Mahmood Ahmad, the second caliph of the community, remained its Publisher and Printer for the first few years. The first “Katib” (scribe) was one Muhammad Hussain, the Manager was Mirza Abdul Ghafur Bag. The editorial staff included Qazi Zuhoor ud Akmal, Soofi Ghulam Muhammad and Master Abdur Rahim Nayyar, notable Ahmadis of that time. The house of Nawab Muhammad Ali Khan, remained the active working place of the nascent ‘Alfazl’. At present the daily gets actively published from Rabwah Pakistan, as well as a weekly edition is published from London (UK). The past papers have been saved at an archive.

In the United Kingdom, Al-Fazl started its international service, starting its publication on 7 January 1994 published by the Raqeem Press in Islamabad, Tilford. It also had an online service which eventually merged with Al-Fazl International on 23rd of March 2023.

== Mission ==
Within the Ahmadiyya Muslim Community, the newspaper serves as a vehicle for the moral upbringing of the members, preaching of Islam and the preservation of history of the Movement.
