= Malik Ghulam Farid =

Malik Ghulam Farid (1897–1977), was a notable Ahmadiyya Muslim scholar. He was deputed the task of preparing the 5 Volume The English Commentary of the Holy Quran, in 1942, by Mirza Mahmood Ahmad, the second Khalifa. He published the said Commentary in 1962. Later, in 1969, Malik published the Abridged Edition. Malik Ghulam Farid also produced a Dictionary of the Holy Quran, but it could not be published in his lifetime. He died in 1977.
