= Dictionary of the Holy Quran =

The Dictionary of the Holy Quran was prepared in 1969, by Malik Ghulam Farid (1897–1977), a notable Ahmadiyya scholar and Missionary. The author, Malik Ghulam Farid, also edited the five-volume The English Commentary of the Holy Quran, covering about 3,000 pages. He writes that during the editing work of the Commentary, he also worked upon the preparation of a Dictionary of the Holy Quran. This dictionary contains more than 1,400 Arabic roots with their derivatives. The Arabic words, along with the Arabic letters and particles have been explained in English.

The Roots have been quoted with the respective verses of the Quran where they occur, thus the Dictionary also forms a sort of concordance of the Holy Quran. The writer says, “The whole project was based on standard dictionaries of Arabic language such as the Lisan al-Arab, the Taj al-'Arus, the Mufradat of Imam Raghib, the Arabic English Lexicon by E. W. Lane and the Aqrab AI-Mawar etc.

The current edition has been published by Islam International Publications Limited, “Islamabad”, Sheephatch Lane, Tilford, Surrey GU10 2AQ UK (2006). ISBN 1 85372 821 7.
