= Tafsir-i Kabir (Ahmadiyya) =

Urdu exegesis of the Quran by Mirza Bashir-ud-Din Mahmud Ahmad

Tafseer-e-Kabeer (Urdu: تفسير کبير, tafsīr-e-kabīr, "The Extensive Commentary") is a 10 volume Urdu exegesis of the Quran written by Mirza Bashir-ud-Din Mahmud Ahmad, the second Caliph of the Ahmadiyya Muslim Community, over a period of 20 years.

== Background and purpose ==
Mirza Mahmood Ahmad was the second caliph and leader of the Ahmadiyya movement in Islam. The first of the 10 volumes this work were published in 1940 by Zia ul Islam Press, Qadian. In the preface to the first volume, explaining need for a modern commentary, Mahmood Ahmad acknowledged the importance of the classical commentators like Ibn Kathir, Zamakhshari, Abu Hayyan etc. and the great service they rendered for the Quran, but stated that they made two fundamental mistakes. Namely, they uncritically included questionable narrations from unsound sources in their comments and they relied too heavily on Jewish literature. As a result, some subjects had become a source of ridicule for Islam and the person of Muhammad. He also believed that the idea of abrogation had been of great detriment to the purity and authenticity of the divine nature of the Quran from which it needed to be absolved. Moreover, according to the author, the Quran contained prophecies and those prophecies which had been fulfilled up until the time of this commentary, constituted an important part of the evidence that it was the revealed word of God.

== Features and themes ==
A peculiar feature of this work is that the author claimed to have been divinely taught the meanings and purport of Quranic verses and chapters. Throughout the commentary he suggests the vital importance of the order in which chapters were arranged in the present form. The commentary stresses the importance of a number of aspects in Quranic commentary which were thought a novel approach at the time of its publication such as the inter-relationship of the text of the entire Quran and of each Surah to the preceding, the themes of the Quran are connected and all chapters, verses and words are perfectly and purposefully arranged according to a coherent and logical system. It also presents a distinctive eschatological reading of the Qur'an, applying many of its prophecies to the present times, as per Ahmadiyya beliefs, such as with reference to Surah 18 (al-Kahf) and especially the latter chapters of the Quran.

the explanatory notes place a particular importance on refuting the principal objections raised against Islam by non-Muslim writers. It is claimed that such objections were based either upon ignorance or deliberate misrepresentation of the teachings of Islam. Such objections have been refuted with the intent to remove the bias and prejudice against Islam, and make a better understanding of its teachings possible. The commentary is thus written in the style of an argument for Islam. Repeated references and comments are made on the works of famous orientalists like Theodor Nöldeke, William Muir and William Montgomery Watt as well as numerous Muslim theologians and commentators. The author has frequently dismissed the views of these writers in favour of a more linguistic approach towards understanding the meanings of the Quran. As compared to other classical texts, this commentary seems to rely less on Asbab al-nuzul or reasons of revelation of verses. This approach greatly reduces the impact and validity of negative remarks and objections made on the Quran by non-Muslim critics. It deals particularly with such practical teachings of the Quran as pertain to moral and socio-political ideas and economic relations; and frequently comments upon verses with reference to the various theories and findings of what were then the newly emerging natural and social sciences of the 19th and early 20th centuries. The commentary also adopts a more comparative approach to the Quran than earlier commentators vis-a-vis the beliefs and teachings found in other religions and ideologies.

Each verse is explained separately in two sections. The first section gives different translations of the words in the verse according to major classical Arabic lexicons along with their different uses derived from classical Arabic prose and poetry. The second section contains detailed commentary. A detailed bibliography of references and indices are provided at the end of each volume.

== Translations ==
The work, originally written in Urdu, has been translated into Arabic. An English 5 volume commentary by Malik Ghulam Farid, though not strictly a complete translation, is largely based on this commentary.

== Contents of the commentary ==
=== Urdu ===
In 15 volumes:

- Volume 1: Surah 1 and portion of Surah 2.
- Volume 2: Surah 2 (Verses 48 - 148)
- Volume 3: Surah 2 (Remaining verses)
- Volume 4: Surahs 10-12
- Volume 5: Surahs 13-15
- Volume 6: Surahs 16-18
- Volume 7: Surahs 19-20
- Volume 8: Surahs 21-24
- Volume 9: Surahs 25-26
- Volume 10: Surahs 27-29
- Volume 11: Surahs 78-85
- Volume 12: Surahs 86-90
- Volume 13: Surahs 91-98
- Volume 14: Surahs 99-107
- Volume 15: Surahs 108-114
