= Ansarullah (Ahmadiyya) =

Organization

Flag of Ansarullah

Majlis Ansarullah (Arabic: مجلس انصار الله; Association for the Helpers [in the cause] of Allah) is an auxiliary organization of the Ahmadiyya Muslim Community for men above forty years of age. It was founded in 1940 by Mirza Bashir-ud-Din Mahmud Ahmad, the second caliph of the Community. As an organization comprising the elders of the Community, it often provides intellectual and spiritual guidance for its younger members and has local and national leadership, with national leaders reporting directly to the caliph.

== Aims and objectives ==
The aim of the organization is to promote the moral and spiritual training of its members resulting in a Godly, righteous, responsible and just society, true both to God and His creatures. The aims and objectives of the organization are reflected in the pledge, which every member has to make and recite in every formal meeting. These aims are:

- To inculcate the following amongst its members:
  - The love of Allah.
  - The spirit to promote and propagate the teachings of Islam.
  - Exhort to preach Islam and serve mankind.
  - The spiritual and moral training of children.
  - The spirit of protecting the institution of Caliphate.
  - The spirit of placing collective interests above individual interests.

== See also ==
- Khuddam-ul Ahmadiyya
- Lajna Imaillah
