= Waqf-e-Jadid =

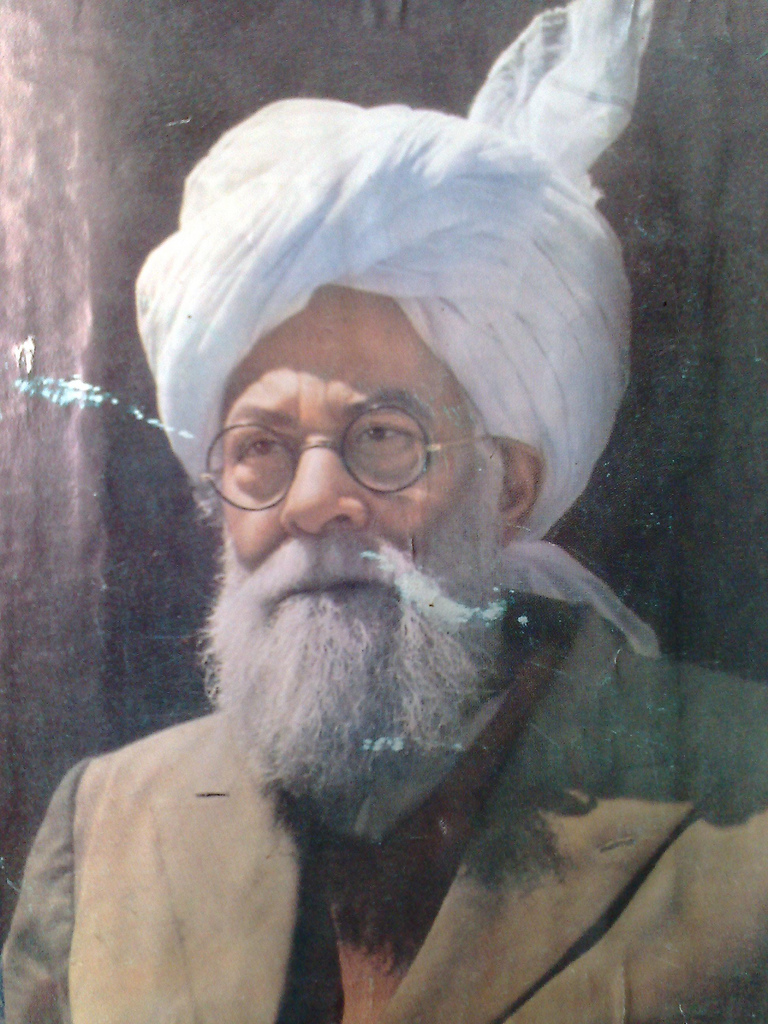
Mirza Bashiruddin Mahmood Ahmad

Waqf-e-Jadid (also known as The New Dedication) is a scheme initiated by Mirza Basheer-ud-Din Mahmood in 1957, and was launched to spread Islam and Ahmadiyyat in remote areas of Pakistan, especially in the province of Sindh.

The scheme was initially only for the Ahmadis of Pakistan, but was made world-wide by Mirza Tahir Ahmad later. The primary objective of this project was to look after the spiritual upbringing of the members living in the rural communities.

It's one of the two schemes launched by Khalifatul Masih II. The other being Tehrik-e-Jadid.

== History ==
Initially, the scheme, started in 1957 (69 years ago) by Mirza Basheer-ud-Din Ahmad to spread Ahmadiyyat in remote areas of Pakistan, was only for the Ahmadis of the country, but was further extended to Africa and India. However, after migration to UK, in 1985, Mirza Tahir Ahmad made this scheme worldwide.

Mirza Tahir Ahmad was first appointed to lead the efforts of Waqf-e-Jadid. He was specifically instructed to focus on the two main objectives of the scheme.

== Objectives ==
Khalifatul Masih II has laid out The Two Objectives for the establishment of this scheme.

Firstly, the moral training and Tabligh (propagation of Islam) among the rural Jama'ats of Pakistan. Secondly, he instructed to concentrate on Tabligh to the Hindu community in the Sindh province of Pakistan.

The aim of this scheme is to create a network of Teachers (Mualimeen) who should be wholly devoted to the moral and spiritual training of the members and to provide religious education to members of rural Jama'ats, as well as to spread the message of Tauhid (Oneness of God).

Khalifatul Masih III has particularly encouraged participation among children.
