= All India Kashmir Committee =

Muslim pressure group in British India

All India Kashmir Committee was set up by Muslim leaders of British India, mainly British Punjab, to fight for the rights of Muslims in the princely state of Jammu and Kashmir. A number of other leaders were invited by Mirza Bashir-ud-Din Mahmood Ahmad to form the committee in order to gain political support and Spread their ideology which was opposed by majority of Muslims.
