= Nusrat Jahan Begum =

Consort Mirza Ghulam Ahmad (1865–1952)

- Born: Sayyeda Nusrat Jahan Begum; 1865
- Died: 1952 (aged 86–87)
- Spouse: Mirza Ghulam Ahmad (m. 1884)

Sayyeda Nusrat Jahan Begum (1865–1952), and Hazrat Amman Jan ‘Beloved Mother' within the Ahmadiyya Community, was the second wife of Mirza Ghulam Ahmad and the daughter of Mir Nasir Nawab of Delhi. The marriage is seen, within the Community, as having fulfilled certain prophecies.

== Family history ==
The family had descended from the “Ahl al-Bayt” (Family) of Muhammad (Claimed by Ahmadiya's), hence called the “Sada'at”. The genealogical tree connects her to Hussain the grandson of Muhammad after 40 generations. Her forefathers had migrated from Bukhara in the reign of the Mughul King Shah Jahan. The well known Urdu poet and Mystic Khwaja Mir Dard (1721–1785) was the great grand father of Nusrat Jahan Begum.

== Early life ==
Nusrat Jahan Begum was born to Mir Nasir Nawab (1846 – 19 September 1924) and Sayyad Begum (1849 – 24 November 1932) in Delhi in 1865. In her young age she was also called ‘Ayesha Begum’ and ‘Naseer ul Jehan’.

== Marriage to Mirza Ghulam Ahmad ==
The marriage of Nusrat Jahan Begum and Mirza Ghulam Ahmad took place in November 1884, at Delhi, and was performed by Nazir Husayn Dehlawi, the pre-eminent figure within the Ahl-i Hadith movement in Delhi. Nazir Husayn was so old and weak that he was brought in a Doli (palanquin, also known as palkhi). The Dower was fixed Rs.1100. Ghulam Ahmad paid the cleric Rs.5 and a 'Prayer mat'. Very few of his friends had accompanied Ghulam Ahmad to Delhi. They included a servant Hamid Ali and a Hindu friend Lala Malawa Mal.

== A spiritual order ==
The great-grandfather of Nusrat Jahan, with the name Muhammad Nasir Andaleeb (1692–1758), is said to be a known poet and spiritual personality. He had been the author of many books, prose and poetry. Muhammad Nasir Andaleeb was a contemporary of Shah Waliullah (1703–1762), Shah Abdul Aziz (1745–1823), and Muhammad Fakhr-ud-din. It is reported that he saw a vision that his Spiritual Order shall last till the Mahdi appears and will then get merged in the Order established by the Mahdi.

== Nusrat Jahan Begum and claims of Ahmad ==
Mirza Ghulam Ahmad claimed he had received a divine revelation on 20 February 1886; two years after his wedding to Nusrat Jahan. Till then he had no issues from her. He published his divine revelations as an Announcement

"[Urdu] Your house will be filled with blessings and I shall perfect My favours unto you and you will have a large progeny from blessed women, some of whom you will find hereafter, and I will cause a great increase in your progeny and will bless it; but some of them will die in early age and your progeny will spread greatly in different lands. Every branch of your collateral will be cut off and will come to an end soon through childlessness.......Your progeny will not be cut off and will flourish till the end of days". [Announcement of February 20, 1886, Majmu‘ah Ishtiharat, vol. 1, pp. 102–103]

Mirza Ghulam Ahmad also predicted that a son would be born to him, a possessor of great qualities. He wrote in the same Announcement (20 February 1886):

"A handsome and pure boy is coming as your guest. His name is Emmanuel and also Bashir. He has been invested with a spirit of holiness, and he is free from all impurity. He is the light of Allah. Blessed is he who comes from heaven. He will be accompanied by grace which shall arrive with him. He will be characterized with grandeur, greatness and wealth. He will come into the world, and will heal many of their disorders through his Messianic qualities, and through the blessings of ... He is the Word of Allah for Allah’s mercy and honour have equipped him with the Word of Majesty. He will be extremely intelligent and perceptive and will be meek of heart and will be filled with secular and spiritual knowledge.....His advent will be greatly blessed and will be a source of manifestation of Divine Majesty. Behold a light comes, anointed by God with the perfume of His pleasure. We shall pour Our Spirit into him and he will be sheltered under the shadow of God. He will grow rapidly in stature and will be the means of procuring the release of those held in bondage. His fame will spread to the ends of the earth and peoples will be blessed through him. He will then be raised to his spiritual station in heaven. [Arabic] [This is a matter decreed.]

== Children ==
Ten children were born to Nusrat Jahan Begum:

Five children died young:

1. Ismat (15 April 1886 – July 1891)
2. Bashir (7 August 1887 – 4 November 1888)
3. Shaukat (1891–1892)
4. Mirza Mubarik Ahmad (14 June 1899 – 16 September 1907)
5. Amtul Naseer (28 January 1903 – 3 December 1903)

Five children lived longer:

1. Mirza Basheer-ud-Din Mahmood Ahmad (12 January 1889 – 8 November 1965)
2. Mirza Bashir Ahmad (20 April 1893 – September 1963)
3. Mirza Sharif Ahmad (24 May 1895 – December 1961)
4. (Nawab) Mubarika Begum (2 March 1897 – 23 May 1977)
5. (Nawab) Sahiba Amtul Hafeez Begum (25 June 1904 – 6 May 1987)

== Last days ==
Nusrat Jahan Begum joined Mirza Ghulam Ahmad in 1884, five years before the foundation of the Ahmadiyya Muslim Community in 1889 and lived till the age of 87. She died in 1952.
