= Wembley's Conference of Living Religions 1924 =

Part of the British Empire Exhibition of 1924

Wembley's Parliament of Living Religions was part of the British Empire Exhibition of 1924, inviting famous representatives of important living religions within the British Empire. Although the exhibition was held at Wembley in Middlesex the conference was held at the Imperial Institute, between 22 September and 3 October 1924.

The tradition of this and similar World Fairs go back to the early 18th century. Some of the more famous ones have been The Great Exhibition of 1851 in London and Parliament of the World's Religions in Chicago in 1893.

== Religions (not) presented ==
William Loftus Hare (1868-1943), at the time Director of Studies in Comparative Religion and Philosophy to the Theosophical Society, wrote:

"Christianity and Judaism were excluded from our plan for several sufficient reasons – not because, as some critic had not very seriously suggested, we considered them to be‚ no longer living religions. To have attempted to include the Christian faith in a short conference of single sessions would have involved many difficulties, the first being the invidious choice of expositors. We could not have pleased everybody. Secondly, we should have been instructing the already instructed. Thirdly, it would have been something of an impertinence for us to set up a new pulpit amid the thousands to which people may resort already. In lesser degree the same arguments apply to Judaism, which in its main Biblical features, is very familiar. We had of course, no anti-Christian bias nor had any of our expositors, except in the most formal sense. Practically, the English and the Christian received and returned the utmost friendliness. We placed Hinduism first on our program for various reasons which are apparent. Two hundred and seventeen millions of our fellow citizens deserved more than one lecture and would have had more if our time for preparation had been extended."

== Main participants and religious representatives ==
- Mirza Bashir-ud-Din Mahmud Ahmad (Islam)
- Sir Francis Young-Husband
- Pandit Shyam Shankar
- Al-Haj Khwaja Kamal-ud-Din
- Mustafa Khan
- Sheikh Kahdim El Dojaily
- Sufi Hafiz Raushan Ali
- Dr. W.A. de Silva
- Mr. G.P. Malalasekera
- Mr. Shoson Miyamoto
- Shams-ul-Ulema Dastur Kaikobad Adarbad Noshirvan
- Rai Bahadur Jagmander Lal Jaini
- Sardar Kahan Singh
- Mr. Hsu Ti-Shan
- Mr. N.C. Sen
- Professor S.N. Pherwani
- Mr. Mountford Mills
- Mr. Ruhi Afnan
- The Venerable Archdeacon Williams
- Mr. Richard St. Barbe Baker
- Mr. Albert Thoka
- Mr. L.W.G. Malcom
- Professor J. Arthur Thomson
- Mr. Victor Branford
- Professor H.J. Fleure
- Rachel Annand Taylor
- Mr. Christopher Dawson
- Mr. William Loftus Hare
- Professor Patrick Geddes
- Reverend Tyssul Davies
