= Sabo Quarter =

Migrant Hausa settlements in Yorubaland, popularly known as Sabo , are small geographic areas where Hausa migrants settle, congregating to create a distinctive socio-political quarter to foster their cultural heritage and economic interests in the midst of a different ethnic group. At the same time, the Hausa enter into informal contractual obligations to the Yoruba. The rise of ubiquitous Hausa settlements in some major Yoruba cities is mostly attributed to the inter-ethnic or long-distance trading networks that developed over time in West Africa. The exact time-line is unknown but span a millennium. In the early period of the last century, a stream of migrant Hausa settlers began to settle in major Yoruba cities, as a result of their desire to embrace their traditional customs and their "different" norms, they preferred to own their own space in foreign towns under the rulership of a Sarkin Hausawa. However, the quarters became avenues which Hausa communities in Niger and Northern Nigeria use to consolidate their trading networks. The advent of nationalism however, put a dent on the Hausa people’s desire to create their own identity. The two major southern parties promoted the idea of a single region of different interest groups working towards the same goal: nationalism. Since the 1950s, Hausa groups are sometimes seen as political interest groups courted for political affiliations to strengthen southern interest among Northern Nigerians.

== History ==
The Hausa communities in Yoruba land originated as a necessity of long-distance trading. Hausa men developed as specialized dealers in cattle which was abundant in Northern Nigeria but dangerous to breed in Yoruba areas. The need for cattle among Yorubas and kola among Hausa men created an avenue for trade. Hausa men originally lodged at Yoruba owned houses when in Yoruba towns for business and then later gradually increased in minute numbers. But over time, accusations were leveled against some Hausas, coupled with the need to own their own identity, a quarter was awarded to them in different cities by the native rulers. A powerful man of influence would be recognized as the head, he is usually called the Sarkin Hausawa of the city.

== Cultural features ==
The Hausa men in Sabo are fervent in their religious obligations. Prayers according to Islamic rites of the Tijaniyya order is a norm in most areas. However, there are some who practice the cult of Bori. Most times, the Islamic morning prayer is performed alone while the four others are performed collectively. In the community, attaining wealth and Islamic knowledge are the two major criteria for success. Sabo communities became known for having a large number of Mallams or Muslim clerics.
