= Mirza Basheer-ud-Din Mahmood Ahmad =

Ahmadiyya religious leader (1889–1965)

Mirza Basheer-ud-Din Mahmood al-Musleh Maoud
- مرزا بشیر الدین محمود احمد
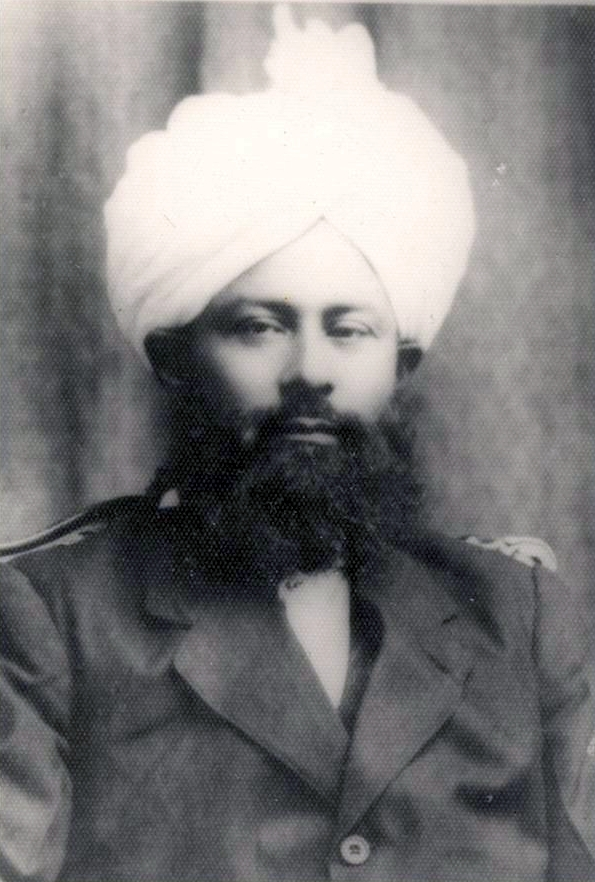
- Mirza Basheer-ud-Din Mahmood Ahmad
- Title: Caliph of the Messiah; Amir al-Mu'minin; Promised Son

Personal life
- Born: 12 January 1889 Qadian, Punjab, British India
- Died: 7 November 1965 (aged 76) Rabwah, Punjab, Pakistan
- Resting place: Bahishti Maqbara, Rabwah, Pakistan
- Spouse: 7 spouses: Mahmuda Begum (m. 1902; d. 1958); Amtul Hai (m. 1914; d. 1924); Syeda Maryam Nisa Begum (m. 1921; d. 1944); Sarah Begum (m. 1925; d. 1933); Aziza Begum (m. 1926–?); Maryam Siddiqa (m. 1935; d. 1996); Bushra Begum (m. 1944; d. 1997)
- Children: 13 sons: Mirza Nasir Ahmad; Mirza Mubarik Ahmad; Mirza Munawar Ahmad; Mirza Khalil Ahmad; Mirza Hafeez Ahmad; Mirza Rafi Ahmad; Mirza Waseem Ahmad; Mirza Tahir Ahmad; Mirza Anwar Ahmad; Mirza Naeem Ahmad; Mirza Haneef Ahmad; Mirza Azhar Ahmad; Mirza Rafiq Ahmad; 9 daughters
- Parents: Mirza Ghulam Ahmad (father); Nusrat Jahan Begum (mother)
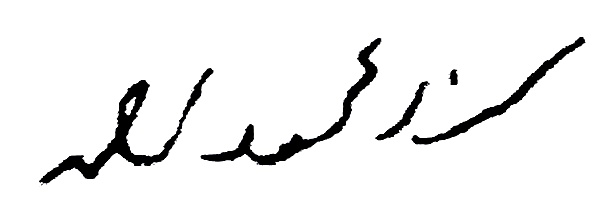
- Signature
- Website: www.fazleumarfoundation.org

Religious life
- Religion: Ahmadiyya Islam
- Consecration: 14 March 1914

Senior posting
- Post: Caliph
- Predecessor: Hakeem Noor-ud-Din
- Successor: Mirza Nasir Ahmad

Mirza Basheer-ud-Din Mahmood Ahmad (مرزا بشیر الدین محمود احمد; 12 January 1889 – 8 November 1965) was the second caliph (Arabic: خليفة المسيح الثاني, khalīfatul masīh al-thāni), leader of the worldwide Ahmadiyya Muslim Community and the eldest son of Mirza Ghulam Ahmad from his second wife, Nusrat Jahan Begum. He was elected as the second successor of Mirza Ghulam Ahmad on 14 March 1914 at the age of 25, the day after the death of his predecessor Hakim Nur-ud-Din.

Mahmood Ahmad's election as second caliph saw a secession within the movement in which a party refrained from pledging allegiance to him on account of certain differences over succession and theology; and possibly owing to a clash of personalities. He led the Ahmadiyya Muslim Community for over half a century and is known for establishing virtually the entire organisational structure of the Community (including five Auxiliary Organisations), improvement of its administration, formally establishing the Majlis al-Shura (Consultative Council), consolidating and formalising the system of financial contributions of the Community and directing extensive missionary activity beyond the Indian subcontinent. He is also known for his Tafsīr-e-Kabīr, a ten-volume exegesis of the Qur'an. A renowned orator, Mahmood Ahmad was also an active political figure especially in pre-independence India. He was also one of the founding members and the first president of the All India Kashmir Committee set up for the establishment of the civil rights of Kashmiri Muslims. Following the Partition of India and the creation of Pakistan in 1947, he carefully oversaw the safe migration of Ahmadis from Qadian to the newly found state, eventually building a town on a tract of arid and mountainous land bought by the Community in 1948 which now became its new headquarters and was named Rabwah. A 26 volume compilation of his works called Anwārul Uloom contains over 800 writings and lectures (excluding the many thousands of sermons). Mahmood Ahmad is regarded by the Ahmadiyya Muslim Community as the Musleh Ma'ood (Promised Reformer) and the "Promised Son" that Ghulam Ahmad foretold God would bestow upon him.

== Early life ==
Mirza Basheer-ud-Din Mahmood was born to Ghulam Ahmad and Nusrat Jahan Begum on 12 January 1889 in Qadian, the same year in which Ghulam Ahmad established the Ahmadiyya Movement by accepting allegiance from his disciples. Due to chronic illness Mahmood Ahmad was unable to attend to secondary education. During his youth, he remained an active member in the service of the Movement by founding a journal entitled Tash'heezul Az'haan and accompanied his father on many of his journeys. On 26 May 1908, Ghulam Ahmad died in Lahore when Mahmood Ahmad was 19 years old. The next day on 27 May 1908, he gave the pledged allegiance to Hakeem Noor-ud-Din, who had been chosen to succeed Ghulam Ahmad. After the passing of his father, Mahmood Ahmad continued to study the Quran, Sahih Bukhari, the Masnavi and some medicine under the tutelage of Noor-ud-Din, with whom he developed a close friendship. Noor-ud-Din would eventually become one of the leading influences in Mahmood's life. He also began writing articles for various periodicals for the Community and would often engage himself in theological debates with various scholars of the Community. Mahmood Ahmad visited Egypt and Arabia in September 1912 during the course of which he performed the Hajj pilgrimage. Upon his return to Qadian in June 1913, he started a newspaper, titled Al-Fazl. Within the Community, the newspaper serves as a vehicle for the moral upbringing of its members, Islamic education and preservation of the Community's history.

== Leadership ==
On 13 March 1914, Khalifatul Masih I Hakeem Noor-ud-Din died shortly after 2 p.m. in Qadian, India. The following day, Noor-ud-Din's will which had been entrusted to Muhammad Ali Khan, a prominent member of the Community, was read aloud in Noor Mosque after Asr prayer. Having hardly finished the reading of Noor-ud-Din's will, members of the community felt Mahmood Ahmad best met the criteria of a successor the will had described and began calling for Mahmood Ahmad to accept their Bai'at (oath of allegiance). Being unprepared, he turned to Maulvi Syed Sarwar Shah and said "Maulvi Sahib, this burden has fallen upon me suddenly and unexpectedly and I cannot even recall the formula of Bai'at. Will you kindly instruct me in it?". He took the Bai'at of those present, repeating the words after Sawar Shah. After the oath was taken, he offered a silent prayer and made a brief speech. Mirza Basheer-ud-Din Mahmood Ahmad was elected as Khalifatul Masih II on 14 March 1914. Under his leadership, there was further development of the scope of missionary activities and the establishment of a Madrasa Ahmadiyya up to the university level. During his tenure, he established 46 foreign missions and founded the Anjuman Tehrik-e-Jadīd, which collected the funds from the members of the Ahmadiyya Muslim Community for the training of missionaries and had them posted to various countries. Mahmood Ahmad also had mosques built in most places where missions had been established. The publication of magazines and periodicals was also initiated in various languages. He also started the translation of the Qur'an into English with a detailed commentary for the benefit of English speaking nations.

=== The Split ===
Soon after Hakim Nur-ud-Din's death in 1914, pre-existing ideological and administrative differences between Mahmood Ahmad and other prominent Ahmadi figures came to a head. As a result, a faction, led by Maulana Muhammad Ali, opposed his succession and refrained from pledging their allegiance to him, eventually leaving Qadian and relocating to Lahore, something which led to a veritable secession and the formation of the Lahore Ahmadiyya Movement. Though a clash of personalities between the dissenters and Mahmood Ahmad has been postulated owing to the latter's relative youth, inexperience and poor academic background, Muhammad Ali and his supporters' differences with him centred mainly upon the nature of Ghulam Ahmad's prophethood—and consequentially the status of Muslims who did not accept him—as well as the form the leadership should take within the movement, viz. the relative authority of the caliph and the Anjuman (executive council).

==== On prophethood ====
Ahmadis universally concur in the belief that Ghulam Ahmad was both the promised Mahdi and Messiah foretold by Muhammad to appear in the end times, and that his prophetic qualities were neither independent nor separable from Muhammad's prophetic mission. However, Muhammad Ali held that the type of prophecy described by Ghulam Ahmad in reference to himself did not make him a prophet in the technical sense of the word as used in Islamic terminology, amounted to nothing more than sainthood and that Islamic mystics preceding Ghulam Ahmad had similarly described experiences of prophecy within Islam and in relation to Muhammad. Accordingly, unlike the majority Islamic belief which expects the physical return of Jesus, the Lahore Ahmadiyya affirm the absolute cessation of prophethood, and believe that no prophet can appear after Muhammad, neither a past one like Jesus, nor a new one.

In contrast, Mahmood Ahmad posited that Ghulam Ahmad's messianic claim and role were qualitatively distinct from the claims of the saints preceding him in Islam and that his prophetic status, though completely subservient to Muhammad, being a mere reflection of his own prophethood and not legislating anything new, still made him technically a prophet irrespective of the type of prophethood or the adjectives added to qualify it. Accordingly, the Ahmadiyya Muslim Community believes that prophecy gifted as a result of perfect obedience and self-effacement in devotion to Muhammad is theologically possible after him, though it affirms the advent of only one such promised end-times figure in Ghulam Ahmad as having appeared in accordance with scriptural prophecies. Such a prophetic status, though not independent, is nonetheless technically classed as prophethood in as much as it involves an individual who is given knowledge of the hidden, predicts future events and is called a prophet by Allah.

==== On other Muslims ====
A closely linked point of contention surrounded the status of Muslims who did not accept Ghulam Ahmad's claim. Muhammad Ali and his supporters, rejecting indiscriminate pronouncements of disbelief (Kufr) concerning them, drew a distinction between those who were neutral in the controversy and those who actively rejected and opposed Ghulam Ahmad, or pronounced him an infidel. The former could not in any sense be termed disbelievers (kafirs) while the latter were guilty only of rejecting a particular commandment of the Islamic faith—namely that pertaining to belief in the promised Messiah—which would render them fasiqun (those who depart from the right path) in distinction to disbelief in a basic element of the faith which would have excluded them from the Muslim community (Ummah). Muhammad Ali repudiated the idea of declaring the entire Muslim community as disbelievers, a term which, according to him, could not apply to non-Ahmadi Muslims indiscriminately, something which he accused Mahmood Ahmad of doing.

Affirming a different typology of disbelief, i.e. that which subsists outside of Islam in contrast to that which does not entail exclusion from it, although Mahmood Ahmad held that Muslims who did not accept Ghulam Ahmad technically fell into the category of disbelief, and that rejection of him ultimately amounted to rejection of Muhammad, he utilised the broad connotations and usages of the Arabic word Kafir to stress that his use of the term in reference to such Muslims did not carry its demotic meaning, but rather meant to signify doctrinal deviancy and to express that only Ahmadis were true Muslims. For him, since such Muslims as had not accepted one appointed by God (ma'mur minallah) within Islam were neither deniers of God nor Muhammad, they were still part of the Muslim community and were Muslims only in the sense that they belonged to the Ummah of Muhammad and as such were entitled to be treated as members of Muslim society (mu'ashira), which, according to him, was different from saying that they are Muslims and not kafirs. He held, therefore, that non-Ahmadi Muslims were to be classified as disbelievers albeit within the remit of Islam and not in the sense that they had a religion other than Islam; and, further, that the movement passed no judgement as to their fate in the hereafter and never proactively expressed this opinion of them. Although he refused demands from outside the movement to accept that the term Kafir did not apply to non-Ahmadi Muslims, Mahmood Ahmad did maintain that such Muslims were not deemed to be outside the pale of Islam.

==== On succession ====
Towards the end of 1905, Mirza Ghulam Ahmad published a short treatise anticipating his own death entitled Al-Wasiyyat (or The Will) in which he established the Sadr Anjuman Ahmadiyya (Central Ahmadiyya Council), an executive body set up to administer the movement and to collect and distribute funds to support the propagation of Islam. Ghulam Ahmad presided over the Council himself until his death in 1908. After his death, Hakim Nur-ud-Din was unanimously chosen to succeed him and presided over the council's appointed president. Muhammad Ali and his supporters held that Ghulam Ahmad, in The Will, had designated the council as a consultative institution to be his successor. Viewing as autocratic the idea of one individual wielding absolute authority within the Community and demanding total obedience from it, they repudiated the idea of a khilāfah (caliphate) within the movement, preferring what they saw as a more democratic system established by Ghulam Ahmad himself and, accordingly, vested the Community's authority in the council as an administrative body. No individual had the power to revoke the decisions reached by the majority of the Council that would remain paramount and binding, something which they believed was in keeping with Ghulam Ahmad's instructions for the movement's administration after his death. Further, according to them, since leadership of the movement was no longer divinely appointed after Ghulam Ahmad's death, the obligation to pledge allegiance to his successor had also lapsed and had become a voluntary act.

As opposed to the foregoing approach, Mahmood Ahmad, who assumed the movement's leadership as the second successor the day after Nur-ud-Din's death, held that Ghulam Ahmad had envisioned a system of divinely ordained caliphate to succeed him, similar to that believed to have commenced following the death of Muhammad, under whose authority the council was to operate. Accordingly, he favoured centralised, singular authority through the system of caliphate which, in his view, was religiously indispensable and to which the Community's allegiance was necessary. Ghulam Ahmad's successors, according to him, continued to be divinely ordained and commanded obedience from the Community. This, he contended, was clearly indicated in The Will as well as Ghulam Ahmad's other works and was an arrangement which, according to him, had existed throughout the period of Nur-ud-Din's leadership who not only spoke of himself as the khalīfat al-masīh (caliph; lit. successor of the Messiah) but declared that he had attained this office by divine appointment rather than community choice. The Ahmadiyya Muslim Community, accordingly, vests its religious and organisational authority in the caliph as Ghulam Ahmad's divinely chosen successor.

=== The non-cooperation movement ===
Mahmood Ahmad became an important political figure in pre-independence India, and had close contacts with the leadership of All-India Muslim League. In 1919 following the defeat of Turkey during the first world war, which had a profound effect on the Muslims of India, the All India Muslim Conference was held in Lucknow to discuss Turkey's future existence. Mahmood was invited to attend, but could not attend in person. However, he wrote a booklet, on the subject of The future of Turkey and the duty of Muslims which was read out at the conference.

Mahmood was usually at variance with the activities of the Khilafat movement which strove to defend the Ottoman Caliphate, sought to pressure the British Government and to protect the Ottoman Empire. The Movement became a major part of the struggle of the Non-cooperation movement Mahmood maintained that the activities of the movement were against the teachings of Islam and would ultimately prove detrimental for the Muslims. He emphasised the absence of the conditions in which Islam allows non-cooperation and instead advocated a positive engagement with the British so as to allay any prejudices towards Islam. He also criticised Mohandas Gandhi's election as leader of the movement, lamenting the Muslim leaders for turning to a non-Muslim for their cause.

=== Inter-faith understanding ===
In 1919, Mahmood Ahmad also appointed a number of young talented Ahmadis to research into the world's major religions. He also delivered a number of public lectures on The need for religion and The dependence of peace upon Islam in the future. In 1920, in order to promote understanding and harmony between Hindus and Muslims he suggested that Hindus should send twenty students to Qadian for the study of the Quran, and sent two Muslim students himself to certain Hindu centres for the study of the Vedas. He also gave lectures on the exposition of the Qur'an for Ahmadi men and women.

=== Reforms to the Sadr Anjuman Ahmadiyya ===
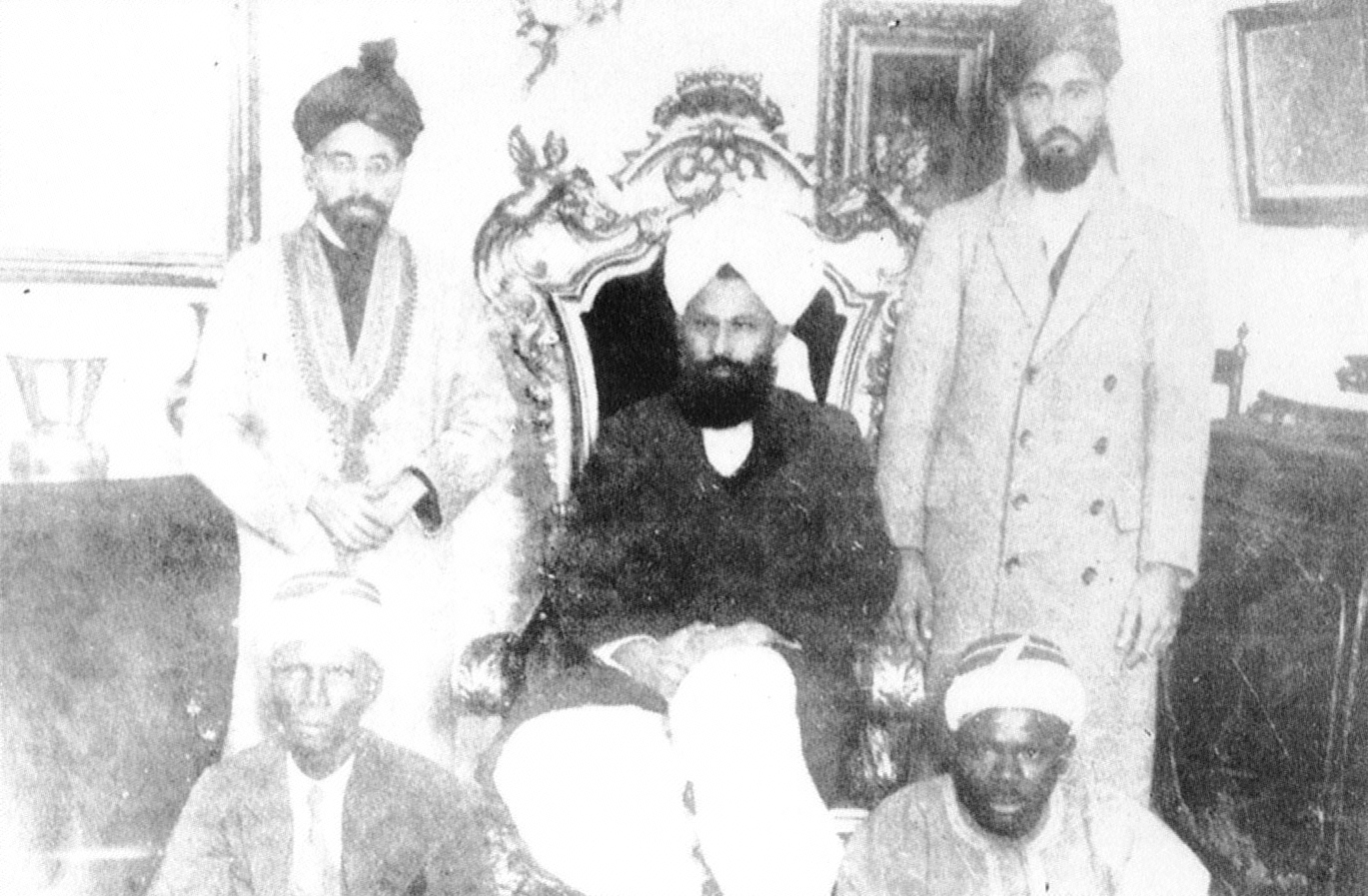
This photo was taken during Mirza Mahmood Ahmad's Tour of England in 1924. From right to left: Fazl ul-Rahman Hakim; Mirza Mahmood Ahmad and Abdul Rahim Nayyar. At the bottom, two West-Africans.

In 1919 Mahmood Ahmad also made certain reforms to the Sadr Anjuman Ahmadiyya (Central Executive Directorate). He initiated the system of separate departments within the Anjuman like education, treasury, literature, and general affairs. Each department is headed by a secretary (Nāzir)

Later reforms included the introduction of the department for external affairs, and the establishment of the system of provincial Amārat initially, only within the Punjab. The Emir of each province functions under the Caliph for the Ahmadiyya Muslim Community of various places.

=== Establishment of Majlis-i-Shūra ===
In 1922 Mahmood Ahmad established the Majlis-ash-Shura or the Consultative Council of the community. The Majlis consists of elected representatives from various parts of the community who gather once a year and offer counsel and opinion on matters presented to them. The final decision is however left to the Caliph. At the international level, the council is presided over by the caliph. Its main purpose is to advise the caliph on important matters such as finance, projects, education and other issues relating to members of the Community. The caliph may comment, issue instructions, announce his decisions on the proposals during the course of the proceedings or may postpone the matter under further reflection. However, in most cases the caliph accepts the advice given by the majority. At the national level, the council is presided over by the ʾAmīr (National President). At the conclusion of the proceedings, the recommendations are sent to the caliph for approval which he may accept, reject or partially accept.

=== The Shuddhi Movement of the Arya Samāj ===
In the early Twenties the Arya Samāj (a Hindu reformist Movement) started the Shuddhi missionary campaign to revert to Hinduism, those who had converted to other faiths (in most cases to Islam), particularly the Malkanas, a group of Rajputs. The Shuddhi Campaign had been somewhat successful in their activity between 1922 and 1923 and had been active in Agra and in the Punjab. When Mahmood Ahmad came to know of this activity he launched a counter campaign by setting up a network of missionaries across Uttar Pradesh where this activity was rife, to propagate the teachings of Islam and save people from converting to Hinduism.

In 1923, he sent a delegation of Ahmadis to the area to prevent the advancement of the Shuddhis, an act which earned him some popularity among the Muslim elite of India. After having faced extreme resistance, the Aryas announced the end of the Shuddhi movement in September 1923, Though later, the president of Bhartiya Hindu Shuddhi Sabha, Swami Shraddhanand was stabbed by a Muslim fanatic, Abdul Rasheed in 1926. In the latter part of the Twenties and early Thirties, under Mahmood Ahmad's directives various gatherings and meetings were held across the Indian subcontinent commemorating the life of the Islamic Prophet Muhammad known as (Jalsa Seeratun-Nabi) attended by Muslims and non-Muslims alike, a practice which is still carried out by Ahmadis today.

=== Journey to the Middle East and Europe ===
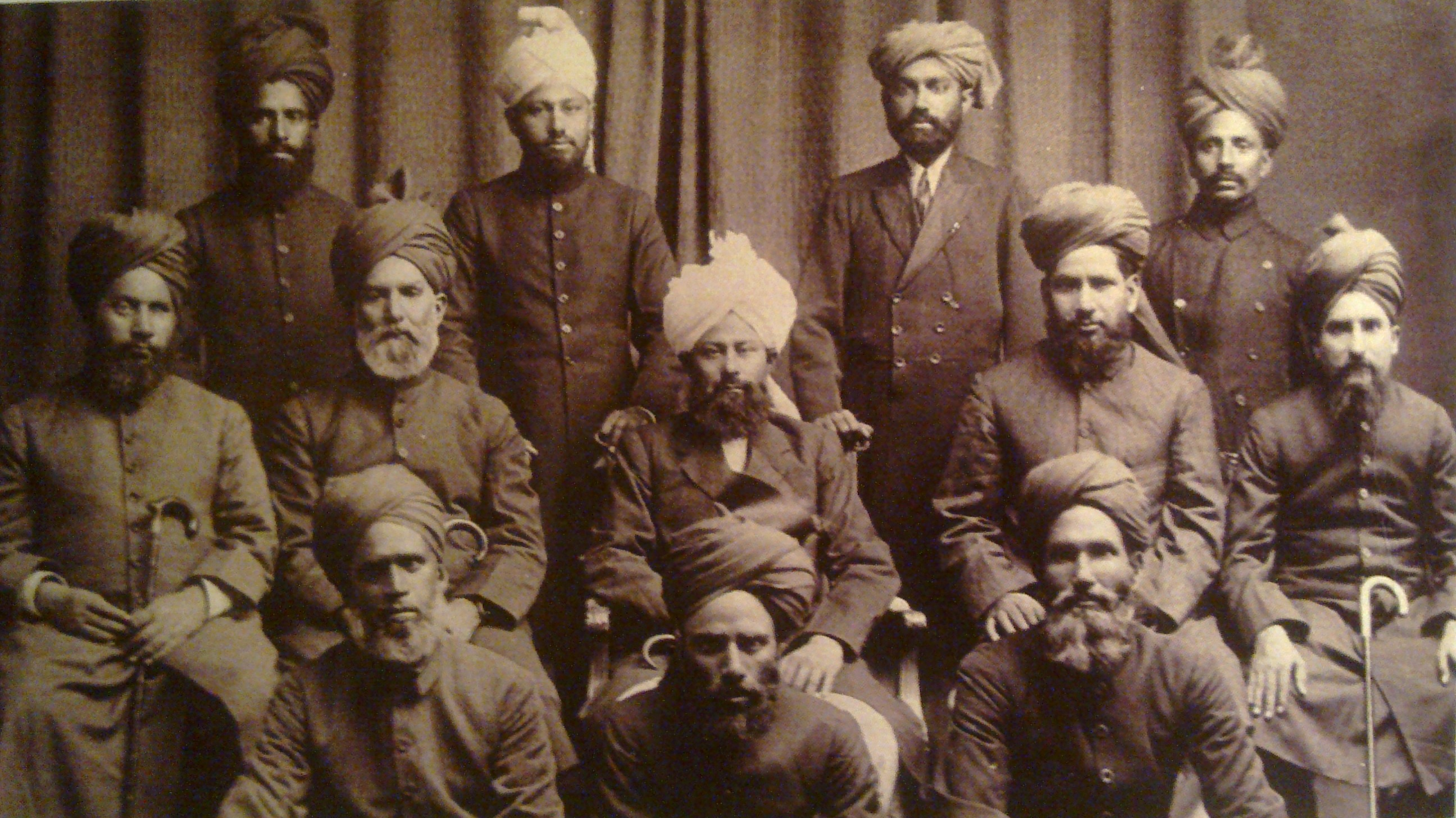
Mirza Mahmood Ahmad (seated center) with the scholars who accompanied him in his tour of the Middle East and Europe.

In 1924, accompanied by 12 eminent Ahmadis, Mirza Mahmood Ahmad visited various Middle Eastern and European countries. He traveled from Port Saeed to Cairo and from there to Jerusalem, Haifa and Akkā. He traveled to Damascus by train where he is reported to have attracted a lot of publicity as well as opposition. Here he discussed Ghulam Ahmad's claims with leading scholars, and held various meetings with the intellectual community of Damascus. On 16 August he reached Italy and stayed in Rome for 4 days. He also visited France and England where he delivered numerous lectures, held meetings and was interviewed by numerous journalists.

=== Arrival in London ===
Upon arrival in London he proceeded directly to Ludgate to fulfill a prophetic Hadith which refers to the Bāb al-Lud (the gate of Lud) and led some 300 Muslims in a lengthy prayer outside the entrance of St Paul's Cathedral. His speech on Ahmadiyyat, the True Islam was read out in Wembley's Conference of Living Religions 1924, where he had been invited by the conveners of the conference to represent Islam. In London he also laid the foundation stone of the Fazl Mosque, an occasion which was well publicised. The construction of the Mosque was completed in 1926 and the cost thereof was borne entirely by the women of the community. Later he also visited Pevensey in order to carry out a ritual imitation of William the Conqueror believing his visit to carry a mystical significance in fulfillment of its spiritual one in lieu of a vision he had seen before his departure, in India. Whilst in Brighton he also paid a visit to the Memorial to Britain's Fallen Comrades-in-Arms from India during World War I known as Chattri (Brighton) and led prayers in the ground in front of the Brighton Pavilion.

=== The All India Kashmir Committee ===
In 1931 the All India Kashmir Committee was set up for the establishment of the civil rights of the Muslims of Kashmir and to alleviate their oppression. Mahmood Ahmad was elected its first president. He sought to gather Muslim leaders with different opinions on one platform and strive unitedly for the cause of the Muslims of Kashmir. He is known to have achieved great success in doing so. The committee turned the attention of the Muslims of Kashmir towards acquiring education and Mahmood Ahmad himself gave practical help towards this cause. It also encouraged trade, commerce and involvement in politics among the Muslims of Kashmir.

The committee however faced strong opposition from the Indian National Congress and the Ahrari campaign against the Ahmadiyya. The Ahrar alleged that the formation of the committee took place by the Ahmadiyya in order to spread its teachings and strongly opposed the leadership of Mahmood Ahmad. In an address to a gathering in 1931 Mahmood advised the Ahrar's thus:

I admonish the Ahrari's that if there is any among them present here, they should go and tell their friends! I care not in the least about these stones and for this reason am not angered with them. They should stop this hearsay for the sake of the oppressed brothers of Kashmir. Let them come; I am ready to leave presidency but they must promise that they will follow the decision of the majority of Muslims. Today we have seen their morals, let them come and see our morals too. I assure them that even after stepping down from presidency, me and my community shall help them (the people of Kashmir) more than their associates. Presidency is not a thing of respect for me. Respect is gained from service. The leader of a nation is one who serves it ...

— Sawan-e-Fazl-e-Umar

Mahmood Ahmad resigned from presidency in 1932 due to the agitations of the Ahrar party.

=== Persecution ===
The Majlis-e-Ahrar-ul-Islam, were a short lived separatist political movement who were former Khalifites. They differed with the Indian National Congress over certain issues and afterwards announced the formation of their party in a meeting at Lahore in 1931. Freely funded by the Congress, the Ahrar were also opposed to the policies of the Muslims League. They declared that their objectives were to guide the Muslims of India on matters of nationalism as well as religion and violently opposed the Ahmadiyya Muslim Community in India on a political level. In 1931 they held a series of conferences and a strong legal protest nearby Qadian where they are reported to have incited hatred against the Ahmadiyya. These were followed by incidents of severe persecution against Ahmadis, many of whom were reported to have been attacked, beaten, stoned, looted and their mosques occupied in a number of places. Mahmood Ahmad advised all Ahmadis not to retaliate, instructed concentration on prayer and explained that passing through periods of persecution was inevitable for the Community.

We have to accept our obligations if we are called upon to sacrifice our spiritual or physical lives or suffer torture at the hands of those who oppose us. Victory achieved without sacrifice is hollow. Sacrifice is the life-blood of divine dispensation. When Moses saw the fire, God said to him Verily I am your Lord indicating that if he wanted to reach God, he would have to pass through it. Hence you too will have to pass through fire and other such dangers on the path to success.

— Al-Fadhl

=== The 'New Scheme' ===
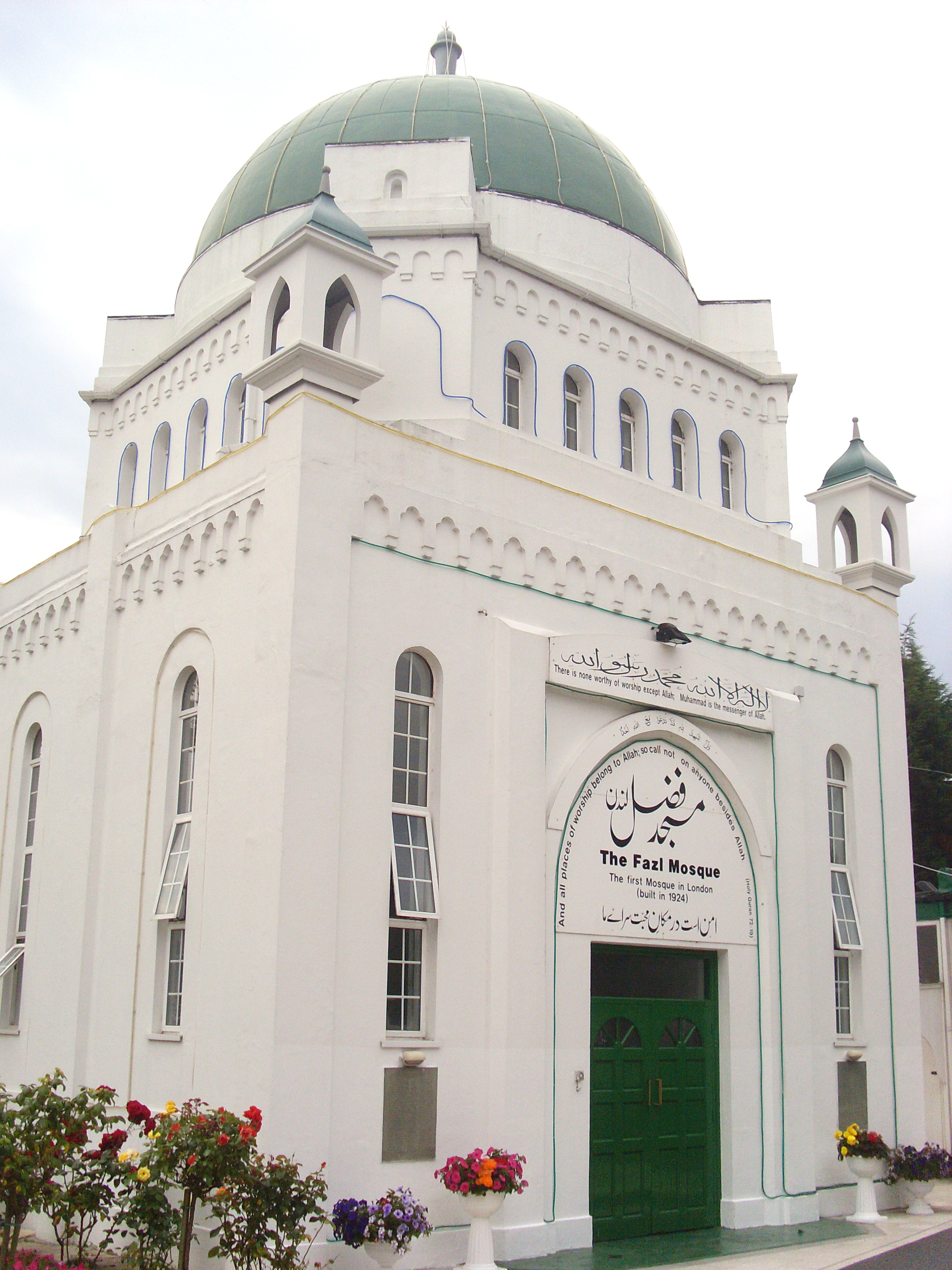
The Fazl Mosque in London, established in 1924

In 1934 Mahmood Ahmad claimed to have been divinely inspired to launch a twofold scheme for the establishment of foreign missions and the moral upbringing of Ahmadis. This initiative called upon members to volunteer themselves for missionary work, and to donate money towards a special fund for propagation in foreign countries during the course of which 46 foreign missions were established.

The Tehrik-e-Jedid and Waqf-e-Jedid or the 'new scheme' and the 'new dedication' respectively, initially seen as a spiritual battle against the oppressors of the Ahmadis, placed before them a number of demands and restriction such as leading simple lives, restrictions against eating, clothing etc.; a temporary ban on all forms of luxury and entertainment. It called upon the members of the Community to dedicate their time and money for the sake of their faith. In time the scheme produced a vast amount of literature in defence of Islam in general and the Ahmadiyya beliefs in particular. The funds were also spent on the training and dispatching of Ahmadiyya missionaries outside the Indian sub-continent and their sustenance. As part of this Mahmood Ahmad appointed 5 men to survey the Punjab in order to find out the best way of disseminating the Ahmadiyya teachings. For the first time an organised method of training members of the community for becoming missionaries was established. Addressing the Ahrari opposition Mahmood said:

In order to expand the propagation of Islam I have urged the youth to come forward and dedicate their lives for the service of religion. Hundreds of young people have already responded to my call. These graduates are given only 15 rupees a month as an allowance. This is a small allowance that barely caters for their basic needs. Yet living on that paltry sum they travel to other countries and propagate the message of Islam. I invited the members of the Community to come forward and make financial contributions, at the same time I said that the time had not yet come for greater sacrifices. I appealed for only 27,000 rupees whereas the community promised 108,000 rupees out of which more than 82,000 rupees have already been received.

— Friday sermon, 27 September 1935

As well as administering proselytisation the scheme also carried the responsibility of a more internal aspect and called upon members of the Community to dedicate their lives for the teaching and moral upbringing of Ahmadis themselves in rural places within India. Later, permanent offices of this scheme were established. The scheme was to grow into international proportions during the leadership of later Caliphs of the Ahmadiyya Muslim Community.

=== Auxiliary Organisations ===
With the expansion of the Community's numbers and work, Mahmood Ahmad established separate auxiliary organisations based on age and gender. The Lajna Amaa' illah for women above the age of fifteen was established in 1922 and the Nasiratul Ahmadiyya for girls aged seven to fifteen years in 1938. The men were divided into three groups, the Khuddam-ul Ahmadiyya for young men aged fifteen to forty; the Atfalul Ahmadiyya for boys aged seven to fifteen, both established in 1938; and the Ansarullah for men above the age of forty which was established in 1940. Mahmood Ahmad's main objective in doing so was for the Community to maintain the highest level of activity, both in terms of the religious and moral training of its members and in the propagation of Islam. Further, the Community was organised as such with the view that its members would be able to work more freely and comfortably within their own respective circles and age groups.

=== The Hijri-Shamsi calendar ===
The Gregorian Calendar is based on the solar movements and starts with the birth of Jesus, while the Hijri (Islamic) calendar is based on lunar movements and starts with the migration of Muhammad form Mecca to Medina, which occurred in 622.

In 1940 under the directives and supervision of Mahmood Ahmad, after much research and calculations, a new calendar was worked out, the Hijri-Shamsi (solar-Hegira) calendar. Although this calendar is based on solar calculations, however it starts form the migration of Muhammad instead of the birth of Jesus. According to this method 2008 CE corresponds to 1387 Hijri-Shamsi (abbreviated as HS), i.e. 1,387 years have passed since the migration of Muhammad from Mecca to Medina. The number and time frame of each month of this calendar is the same as the Christian calendar (the lunar month being shorter by some days than the solar one). Each month of the Solar-Hegira calendar is based on an important event of early Islamic History:

1. Sulh (peace): January
2. Tableegh (preaching): February
3. Amaan (protection): March
4. Shahadat (martyrdom): April
5. Hijrat (Migration): May
6. Ihsaan (benevolence): June
7. Wafaa (loyalty): July
8. Zahoor (appearance): August
9. Ikhaa (brotherhood): September
10. Tabuk (Expedition of Tabuk): October
11. Nabuwwat (prophethood): November
12. Fath (victory): December

=== The Promised Son ===
In a series of public gatherings across India in 1944, he made the claim that he was the 'Promised Son' foretold by his father Mirza Ghulam Ahmad. He explained in a number of meetings held in various places in India that this claim was based on revelations and dreams. He clarified that he wasn't the only Promised Son, and other 'Promised Sons' would appear in accordance with prophecies, some even after centuries. He also prophesied that he would, as it were, return in the form of another Promised Son for the reform of the world at a time when shirk (polytheism) would have become widespread.

He also managed the translation and publication of the Qur´an into various languages. His ten-volume “Tafseer-e-Kabeer” is a complete commentary on the Qur´an. His scholarship of religious and secular subjects was well known among the literary circles. He delivered a series of famous lectures on a variety of topics in educational institutions which were attended by the intellectuals and leaders of that time.

=== Migration to Pakistan ===
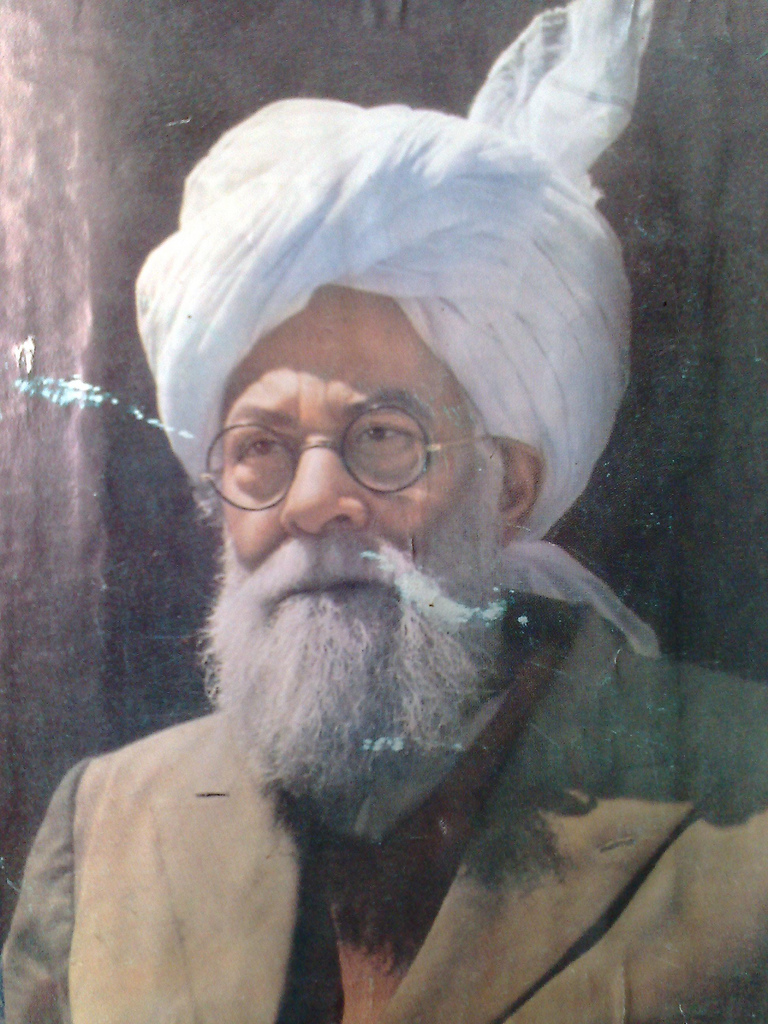
Mirza Mahmood Ahmad in 1954

In 1947 following the independence of Pakistan in 1947. He carefully oversaw the emigration of members of the community from Qadian to Pakistan. He kept 313 men known as Dervishes in Qadian to guard the sites holy to Ahmadis, including two of his sons. Initially the Community settled at Lahore and it wasn't until 1948 that the Community found a tract of arid land and built the town of Rabwah under the leadership of the Khalifa. Rabwah swiftly developed into the Community's new headquarters. In Pakistan, Mahmood Ahmad delivered a series of lectures on the future of Pakistan in terms of:

- Defence
- Agriculture and industry
- Forestation
- Livestock and mineral assets
- Economic growth
- Development of land air and naval forces.

=== The 1953 riots ===
In 1953 there were agitations against the Ahmadis in which street protests were held, political rallies were carried out and inflammatory articles were published. These agitations led to 2,000 Ahmadiyya deaths. Consequently, martial law was established and the federal cabinet was dismissed by the Governor General.

Mirza Mahmood Ahmad announced:

"God Almighty has established the Ahmadiyya Jamaat. If these people win then we admit we were on the wrong path, but if we are on the right path, then they will assuredly fail". (Al-Fazl, 15 February 1953).

=== Assassination attempt ===
On 10 March 1954, a man was able to stand in the first row behind Mahmood Ahmad during Asr prayer. Immediately after the prayer had ended, the man lunged and attacked him by stabbing him twice with a dagger in the neck near the head. He sustained severe injuries but survived. After recovering partially, he traveled to Europe for further medical and surgical treatment due to constant discomfort and unease. Briefly staying in Lebanon, Mahmood Ahmad travelled to Switzerland via Athens and Rome. He continued travelling and received some medical treatment in Zurich, the Netherlands, Hamburg and London. After consulting with his doctors, it was concluded by that the tip of the knife had broken and embedded itself in the jugular vein and that no attempt should be made to remove it.

During his travels, Mahmood Ahmad had also inspected the various missions of the Ahmadiyya Muslim Community in Europe and visited Venice and Austria. In London, Mahmood Ahmad held a conference of all missionaries stationed in Europe and visited various other European countries.

== Death ==
Over the years, Mahmood Ahmad's health continued a prolonged process of slow but progressive decline. He died on 8 November 1965 at 2:20 a.m., in Rabwah, Pakistan. Upon the election of Mirza Nasir Ahmad as Khalifatul Masih III, his successor led the funeral prayer. The service was held on 9 November 1965 and attended by over 50,000 people. He was buried in Bahishti Maqbara in Rabwah next to his mother, Nusrat Jahan Begum.

== Works and speeches ==
The following is a list of some of the major works of Mirza Mahmood Ahmad.

- Tafseer-e-Kabeer (The Extensive Commentary)
- Tafseer-e-Sagheer (The Short Commentary)
- Introduction to the study of the Holy Qur'an
- Invitation to Ahmadiyyat
- Gift to the Kings
- The New World Order of Islam
- Islam ka Iqdisadi Nizam (The Economic System of Islam)
- Muhammad in the Bible
- Haqeeqat al-Nabuwwat (The Truth about Prophethood)
- Ser-e-Roohani (The spiritual Journey)
- Ahmadiyyat, the True Islam
- The Real Revolution
- Fazail al-Qur'an (Excellences of the Qur'an)
- Muhammad the Liberator of Women
- Hindustan ke Siyasi Masael ka hal (Solution to the political problems of India)
- Hasti-ye Bari Ta'ala (The Existence of God)
- Malaykatullah (The Angels of God)
- Did Jesus Redeem Mankind?
- The Truth about the Split
- Way of the Seekers
- Remembrance of Allah
- Life of Muhammad
- Hadhrat Ahmad
- Kalam-e-Mahmood (collection of Poetry of Mahmood)

== Personal life ==
Mirza Mahmood Ahmad was the eldest son of the founder of the Ahmadiyya movement, Mirza Ghulam Ahmad from his second wife Nusrat Jahan Begum. He had three brothers and two sisters in addition to two half-brothers from his father's first wife, Hurmat Bibi. Mahmood Ahmad married seven times, never having more than four wives at a time in accordance with Islamic teachings. He had a total of twenty-eight children from these wives, five of whom died in infancy. His son, Mirza Nasir Ahmad would succeed him as the third caliph of the Ahmadiyya movement. Through his marriage with Amtul Hai in 1914, he also was the son-in-law of Hakim Noor-ud-Din, the first caliph of the Ahmadiyya movement.

== Cited sources ==
- Friedmann, Yohanan (2003). Prophecy Continuous: Aspects of Ahmadi Religious Thought and Its Medieval Background. Oxford: Oxford University Press. ISBN 0-19-566252-0.
- Gilham, Jamie (2014). Loyal Enemies: British Converts to Islam, 1850-1950. New York: Oxford University Press. ISBN 978-1-84904-275-8.
- Gualtieri, Antonio R (1989). Conscience and Coercion: Ahmadi Muslims and Orthodoxy in Pakistan. Montreal: Guernica Editions. ISBN 978-0-920717-41-7.
- Khan, Adil Hussain (2015). From Sufism to Ahmadiyya: A Muslim Minority Movement in South Asia. Bloomington: Indiana University Press. ISBN 978-0-253-01529-7.
- Lathan, Andrea (2008). "The Relativity of Categorizing in the Context of the Aḥmadiyya". Die Welt des Islams. 48 (3/4). Brill: 372–393. doi:10.1163/157006008X364749. JSTOR 27798273.
- Qasmi, Ali Usman (2015). The Ahmadis and the Politics of Religious Exclusion in Pakistan. London: Anthem Press. ISBN 978-1-78308-425-8.
- Valentine, Simon Ross (2008). Islam and the Ahmadiyya Jama'at: History, Belief, Practice. London: HURST. ISBN 978-1-85065-916-7.
