= Khuddam-ul Ahmadiyya =

Auxiliary organisation of the Ahmadiyya Muslim Community

The flag of Majlis Khuddam-ul Ahmadiyya

Majlis Khuddam-ul-Ahmadiyya (Arabic: مجلس خدام الاحمدیة, literally means "Association of the Servants of Ahmadiyya") is one of five auxiliary organizations in the Ahmadiyya Muslim community. It is the young men's branch of the community, particularly for those between the ages of 15 and 40. In some English-speaking countries it is also known as the Ahmadiyya Muslim Youth Association (AMYA).

== Foundation ==
Majlis Khuddam-ul-Ahmadiyya (MKA) was founded in 31 January 1938 by Khalifat-ul Masih II, Mirza Basheer-ud-Din Mahmood Ahmad, the second Caliph of the Ahmadiyya Muslim community. According to the auxiliary's founder, the name Khuddam-ul-Ahmadiyya literally means that its members are "servants of Ahmadiyya."

Mahmood Ahmad established the tenets of Majlis Khuddam-ul-Ahmadiyya to rest on the principles of service and sacrifice, and to inculcate commitment to one's faith, one's country, and to the world, tenets that still resonate through its international membership. The importance of Majlis Khuddam-ul-Ahmadiyya was so great that in 1940 membership was made compulsory for every young man between the ages of 15 and 40, and as a result, branches of Khuddam-ul-Ahmadiyya were established in all parts of the world.

== Motto ==
Nations cannot be reformed without the reformation of the youth.

— Khalifatul Masih II, founder of Ahmadiyya Muslim Youth Association

Quote= Khalifatul Masih 3rd, for Ahmadia Youth,"تیری عاجزانہ راہیں اسے پسند آئیں۔"

== Pledge ==
Members of Khuddam-ul-Ahmadiyya swear an oath of allegiance to their faith, country and nation and reaffirm this oath in formal gatherings. When the pledge is reaffirmed in a formal gathering, the shahadah is recited out aloud three times in Arabic, followed by its translation in the native language of the country and then the rest of the pledge is read out in the native language:

أَشْهَدُ أنْ لَّا إِلٰهَ إِلَّا اللهُ وَحْدَهُ لَا شَرِيْكَ لَهُ وَأشْهَدُ أنَّ مُحَمَّدًا عَبْدُهُ وَرَسُوْلُهُ

Translation: "I bear witness that there is none worthy of worship except Allah. He is One and has no partner, and I bear witness that Muhammad [peace & blessing of Allah be upon him] is His servant and Messenger."

"I solemnly pledge that I shall always be ready to sacrifice my life, wealth, time and honour for the sake of my faith, country and nation. Likewise I shall be ready to offer any sacrifice for guarding the institution of Khilafat-e-Ahmadiyya. Moreover I shall deem it essential to abide by any Ma'roof decision made by Khalifatul Masih. Insha'Allah [God willing]."

== Worldwide establishments ==
My idea of establishing this body is that the knowledge which has been acquired by us and safely locked in our hearts must continue to be passed onto the next generation, and thereafter it must become a continuous cycle so that the world at large may benefit.

— Khalifatul Masih II, founder of Ahmadiyya Muslim Youth Association

In the United States, MKA USA was founded in 1939. In 1968, Munir Hamid was appointed the first National Qaid. This position is now titled Sadr Majlis, put into effect in 1989 under the direction of Mirza Tahir Ahmad, fourth Caliph of the community.

On July 27–29, 1984 the first European Ijtema (gathering) was held in Hounslow, Britain.

== By country ==
=== India ===
Majlis Khuddam ul Ahmadiyya Bharat's headquarters is in Qadian, Punjab.

In India there are about thousands of youths who are member in Majlis Khuddam ul Ahmadiyya Bharat.

=== Nigeria ===
MKAN is the youth wing of the Ahmadiyya Muslim Jama'at, Nigeria. Its name literally means “Association of Servants of the True Islam.” The international organization was founded in 1938 and serves as the young men and boys' auxiliary of the Ahmadiyya Muslim Community.

MKAN is a dynamic and vibrant association serving not only the needs of its members but of its local communities and nation. The association is composed of more than 4,000 youths from the Ahmadiyya Muslim Jama'at Nigeria aged 15 to 40, spread across the 36 states of the federation. MKAN is headquartered in Ahmadiyya Settlements, Ojokoro, Lagos State.

Operating under the auspices of the Khalifa of Islam, MKAN is governed by the National Amila and led by its Sadr. The current Sadr is Roqib Akintunde Akinyemi, an IT Specialist from Lagos State. The National Amila is composed of young men and youth from across the country.

The outreach activities of MKAN are not limited to the Muslim community. It serves the needs of all members of society irrespective of color, race, religion or creed, and promotes interfaith dialogue and co-operation in order to promote peace and harmony. https://khuddam.ng/

=== Bangladesh ===
The headquarters of Majlis Khuaddamul Ahmadiyya Bangladesh is in Dhaka, Bangladesh. It consists of approximately one hundred nine local chapters. The main purpose of this organization is to guide the youth and serve mankind.

=== Belgium ===
Majlis Khuddam-ul Ahmadiyya Belgium (MKAB) is situated in Brussels, Belgium. It consists of 12 local chapters. The main purpose of this organization is to guide its youth and serve mankind.

=== Canada ===
Majlis Khuddamul Ahmadiyya Canada (MKAC) is the youth wing of the Ahmadiyya Muslim Jama’at, Canada, serving Ahmadi Muslim males generally between the ages of 15 and 40. The organization was founded on December 12, 2013, following the growth and formal organization of the Ahmadiyya Muslim Community in Canada, and was established to coordinate religious, educational, and social activities for young men at a national level. MKAC is a non-soliciting organization headquartered at 90 Ahmadiyya Avenue, Maple, Ontario, Canada, and operates through local and regional chapters across the country. Since its incorporation, MKAC has been active in organizing programs focused on religious education, leadership development, physical fitness, and community service, and regularly participates in community events and outreach initiatives aimed at promoting service to humanity and positive civic engagement within Canadian society.

Website: www.khuddam.ca

=== Germany ===
Majlis Khuddam-ul Ahmadiyya Deutschland (MAKD) was founded in 1973 in Hamburg. The first National Ijtema in Germany took place 1980 in Bad Kreuznach. Since 2006 it has taken place in Maimarkt-Gelände in Mannheim.

From 24 to 26 October 1986, the third European ijtema was held on the Nasir Bagh campus in Groß-Gerau.

=== Norway ===
Majlis Khuddam-ul Ahmadiyya Norge (MKA Norge) was founded in 1981 in Oslo with the appointment of its first National Qaid, Ch. Maqsood Virk. The president of this organisation is since 1989 entitled Sadr Majlis.

=== Pakistan ===
See: Majlis Khuddam-ul Ahmadiyya Pakistan

=== United States ===
The Ahmadiyya Muslim Youth Association, USA (MKA USA or AMYA USA) is headquartered at 15000 Good Hope Road Silver Spring, Maryland. It has over 70 chapters and over 3000 active members.

MKA USA, established in 1939, is one of the earliest Muslim youth organizations and is the oldest running Muslim youth organization in America. Its establishment was made possible through the guidance of Khilafat-e-Ahmadiyya and the sacrifices of its early members who worked tirelessly over several decades to establish the organization in America.

In 1969, MKA USA saw the appointment of its first National Qaid and the assembly of the first National Khuddam Amila (administrative body), as well as the commencement of the first National Ijtema (retreat), starting a tradition that continues to this day.

The outreach activities of MKA are not limited to the Muslim community. It serves the needs of all members of society irrespective of color, race, religion or creed, and promotes interfaith dialogue and co-operation in order to promote peace and harmony.
