= Ahmadiyya in Sweden =

Islamic movement

Ahmadiyya, called Ahmadis is a community under the leadership of the caliph in London. The earliest history of the Community in the country begins in 1956, during the Second Caliphate, when Kamal Yousuf was appointed as the head of the mission in Sweden. However it was not until 1970 that the Community was first officially registered. Today, there are two purpose-built mosques, one of which is the oldest in the country, and also a number of other centers, representing an estimated average of 1600 Ahmadis in the country.

== History ==
The earliest history of the Community in Sweden goes back to the year 1956, when during the Second Caliphate, Kamal Yousuf was directed by Muhammad Zafarullah Khan, an Ahmadi Muslim judge based at the International Court of Justice in The Hague, to open an Ahmadiyya mission in Scandinavia. Kamal Yousuf was appointed as the head of the movement in Sweden. Yousuf arrived in Gothenburg on June 14, 1956, before shortly moving to Stockholm.

The Ahmadiyya Muslim Community of Sweden was first officially registered in 1970.

The Community has legal permission to perform religious marriages in the country since 1981.

=== Early activities ===
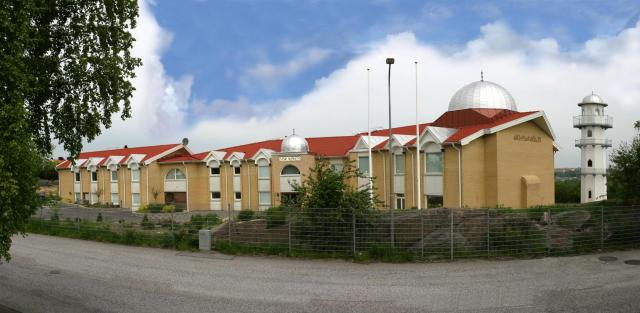
The Nasir Mosque, in Gothenburg, opened in 1976, is the first purpose-built mosque in Sweden

Starting in 1958, the Community published a religious magazine Activ Islam, "Active Islam", edited by an early convert Gunnar H. Eriksson, who adopted the name Saif-ul-Islam Mahmud. The publication was discontinued in 1972 and was revived in 1979. In 1986, the magazine began to be published from Denmark, featuring articles in Danish and other Scandinavian languages as well.

A Swedish convert, Christina Gustavsson, who took the name Qanita Sadiqa, translated the Quran in Swedish in 1988, whose publication, coincided with the Ahmadiyya centenary celebrations.

=== Journeys by caliphs ===
The first caliph to visit Sweden was Mirza Nasir Ahmad. He first visited Sweden in 1973, and then again in 1975 to lay the foundation stone of the Nasir Mosque in Gothenburg, on September 27. The mosque was inaugurated a year later on August 17, 1976 by the same caliph. The caliph visited Stockholm in 1978 and then for the final time visited the country in 1980. The fourth caliph, Mirza Tahir Ahmad visited the country in 1982, to open an Ahmadiyya mission in Malmö, and then once again in 1986.

== Demographics ==
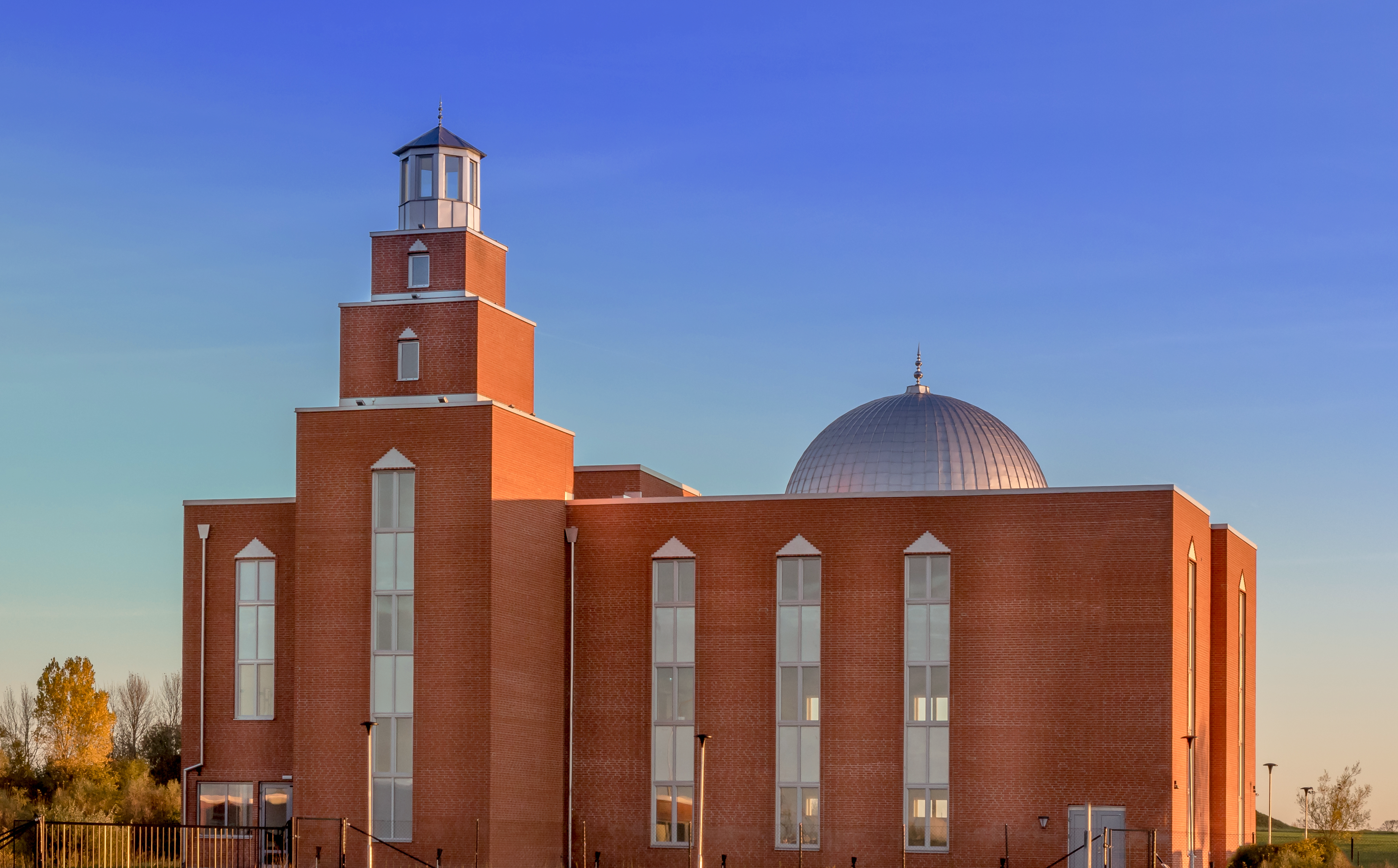
Mahmood Mosque, Malmö, opened on May 13, 2016

Some of the locations of Ahmadiyya mosques and centers in Sweden. The two mosques in Gothenburg and Malmö are purpose-built.

There are approximately 1600 Ahmadi Muslims in Sweden. The majority of the residents are immigrants from Pakistan. However, there are also a small number of Arabs, Africans and Swedish converts. There are four Imams in the country, located in various parts of the country.

== Places of worship ==
There are two purpose built mosques in the country. The Nasir Mosque, opened in 1976, in Gothenburg is the oldest in the country, and is also the location of the national headquarters of the Community. The Mahmoodmoskén was opened in May 2016. There are Ahmadiyya centers is Stockholm and Luleå, in which future mosques have been planned. From 2016, Pakistan-born Rizwan Ahmad Afzal who was previously an imam in Luleå, is the imam of the Mahmood Mosque.

== See also ==
- Islam in Sweden
