= Jalsa Salana =

Annual gathering of the Ahmadiyya Muslim Community

Jalsa Salana جلسہ سالانہ
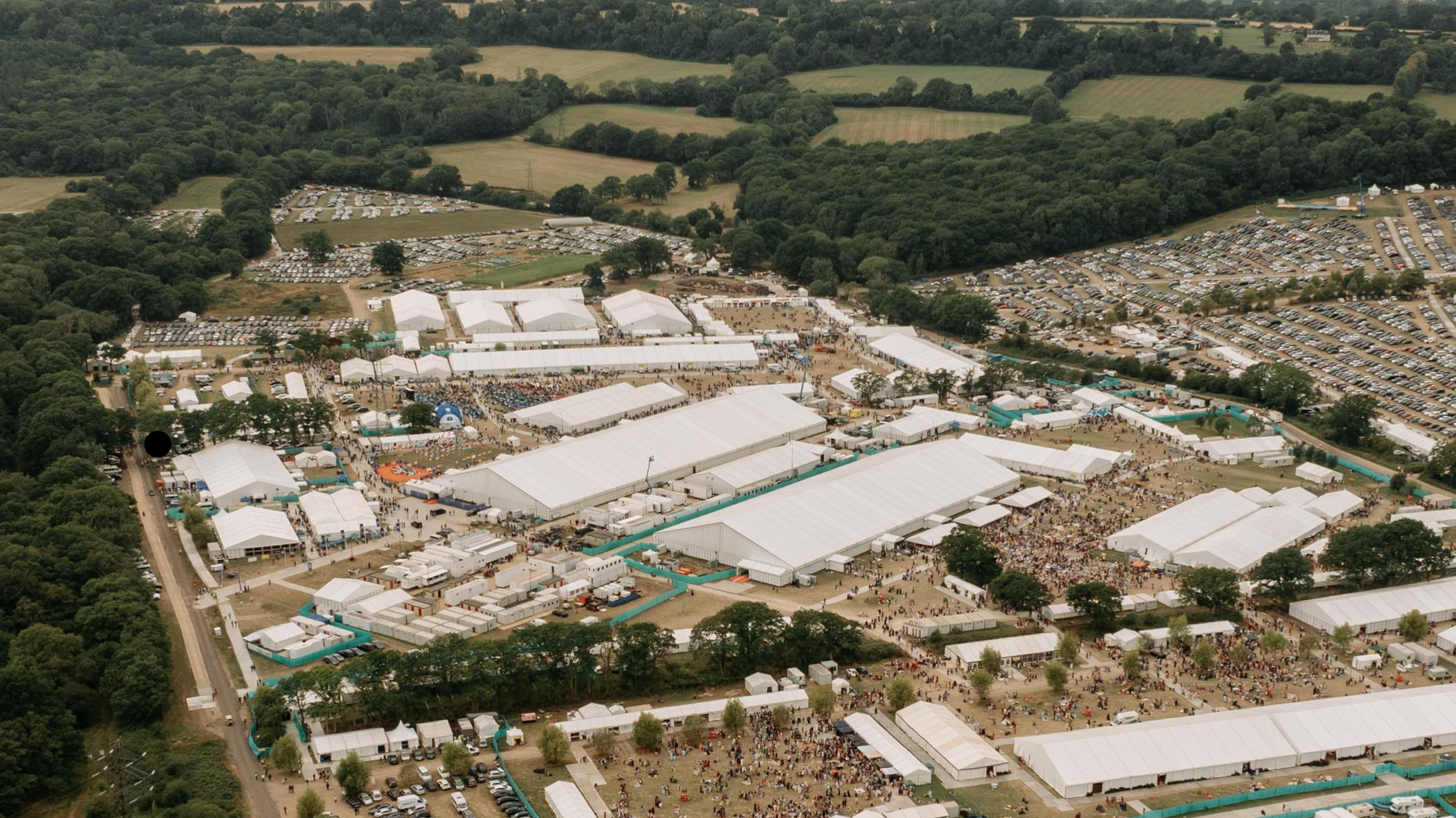
- Years active: 134
- Inaugurated: 1891
- Founder: Mirza Ghulam Ahmad
- Website: jalsasalana.org.uk

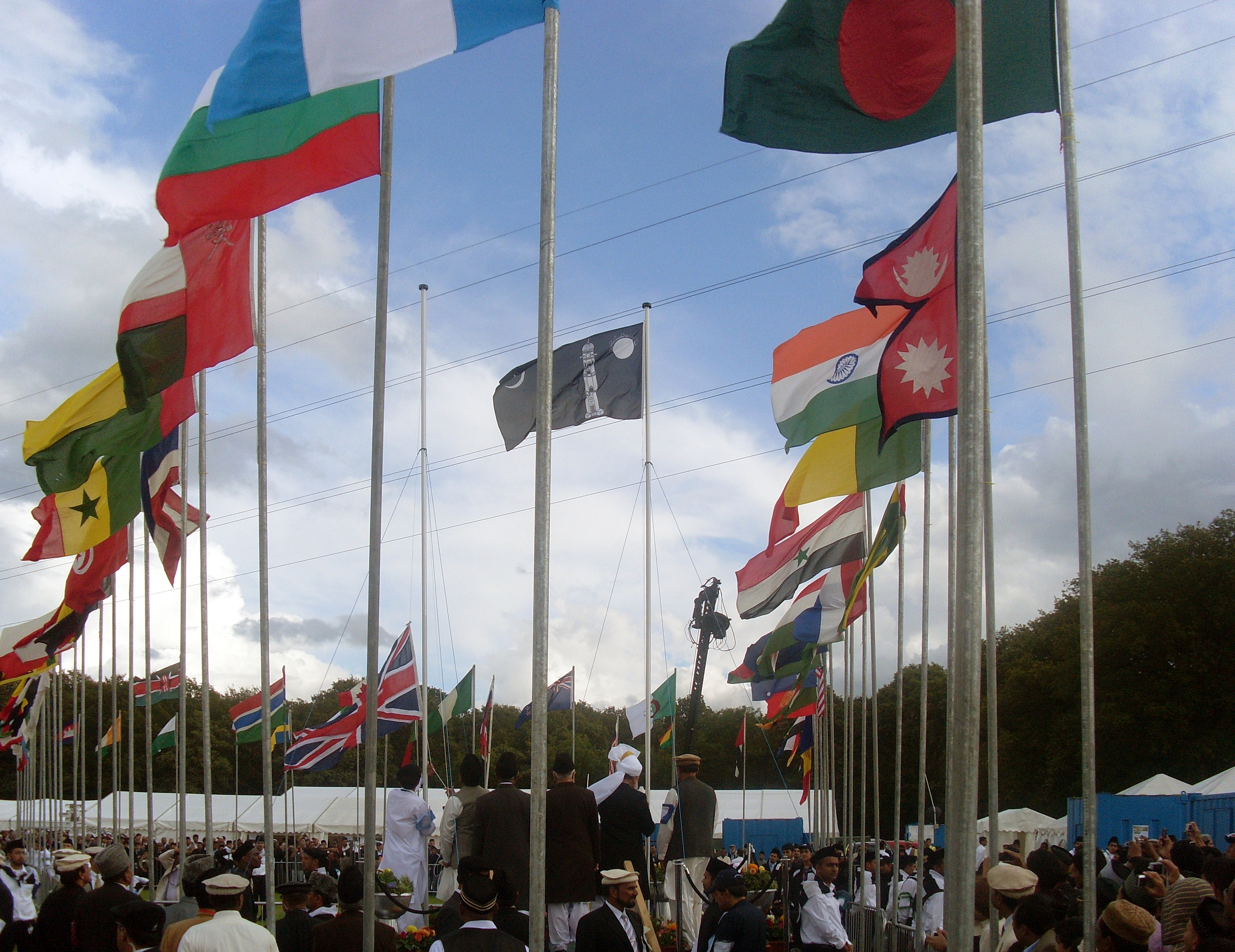
Flag hoisting at the international Jalsa Salana UK 2009

Jalsa Salana (Urdu: جلسہ سالانہ, lit. 'Annual Gathering') is a formal, annual gathering of the Ahmadiyya Muslim Community. It was initiated in 1891 by Mirza Ghulam Ahmad, the founder of the community, in Qadian, India. Usually, the gathering spans three days, beginning with the flag hoisting ceremony following the Friday Sermon. Although the convention held in the UK is deemed to be the major and 'international Jalsa' attended by Ahmadis from across the world, Ahmadis in other countries hold their own national Jalsas, sometimes attended by the Khalifatul Masih.

== History ==
=== In Qadian 1891–1946 ===
In 1891, Mirza Ghulam Ahmad of Qadian claimed that he was the Promised Messiah and Mahdi. In the same year he decided to hold the first annual gathering – the Jalsa Salana – 27–29 December in Qadian, India. The total attendance was 75. In 1907, this number increased to 2000, shortly before the passing of Ghulam Ahmad. The Jalsa steadily grew and began attracting large crowds from across the entire sub-continent. Between 1913-1923, the Jalsas were held at Masjid Noor. The last Jalsa before partition in Qadian in 1946 saw a crowd of nearly 40,000. The Qadian Jalsa remains central to much of the community even now but lost in status as the international Ahmadiyya Muslim Convention in the year 1947 after the Indo-Pakistani partition.

=== In Rabwah 1949–1983 ===
Khilafat, the most venerated and universally accepted institution of authority moved to establish the community's International headquarters in the newly founded town of Rabwah. The International Jalsa of the Community continued to be held in the town of Rabwah and increased in size and influence. Meanwhile, national branches of the community outside the Sub-Continent began holding administratively separate Jalsas across the world with direct permission from Khilafat. The Khalifa would sometimes visit such Jalsas and give personal speeches at the conventions. Some of these conventions included, Jalsa Germany, Jalsa UK, Jalsa Canada, Jalsa USA and Jalsa Ghana. This number slowly increased around the world while in Pakistan, socio-political circumstances began to tighten for the community. With the arrival of Dictator Zia-ul-Haq and the infamous mandate of Ordinance XX the convention was banned in the year 1984 and has not been held in the country since then. The last convention held in Rabwah, in 1983, saw nearly 25000 faithful Ahmadi Muslims attending and seeing one last time the face of their Khalifa in Pakistan. As the institution of Khilafat moved from Pakistan due to the intensifying persecution, so did the operating International HQ of AMJ.

=== In the United Kingdom 1984 – present ===
As Khilafat, the highest administrative, spiritual and moral authority of the Community established its headquarters in London, UK, the Jalsa Salana UK (then entering its 17th year) became a foremost attraction for Ahmadi Muslims from around the world. Under Khilafat, the Jalsa's influence over the community grew and became a model for various Jalsas being held in other parts of the world. Its attendance in 1989 was recorded at 14,000 and increased gradually to a maximum of 40,000 in the Khilafat centenary year of 2008 – the largest Muslim gathering in the UK. Originally held in Tilford, UK at a privately developed parcel of land named Islamabad, Tilford (Sheephatch Farm), the convention since 2006 has been held in Worldham, UK, at Hadiqat-ul-Mahdi (Oaklands Farm). It has developed to become an international scale event in the community with the Ceremony of Allegiance (Takreeb-e-Bait) held at the hands of the Khalifa on the third day. The entire event, just like many other Conventions of the community is streamed live on the community's private broadcasting network Muslim Television Ahmadiyya International and similarly available on the internet with translation in over 10 languages.

== Purpose ==
Mirza Ghulam Ahmad intended to enable Ahmadi Muslims in specific and foreign masses in general to use the Jalsa Salana as an event for spiritual and moral advancement, beneficial social interaction and most importantly to increase personal relationship with God. The convention itself remains strictly under the financial and administrative control of the AMJ.

The primary purpose of this Convention is to enable every sincere individual to personally experience religious benefits; They may enhance their knowledge and – due to their being blessed and enabled by Allah – The Exalted- their perception [ of Allah ] may progress. Among its secondary benefits is that this congregational meeting together will promote mutual introduction among all brothers, and it will strengthen the fraternal ties within this Community...

— Ishtihar 7 December 1892, Majmoo`ah Ishtiharat Vol. I, p. 340

It is essential for all those who can afford to undertake the journey, that they must come to attend this Convention which embodies many blessed objectives. They should disregard minor inconveniences in the cause of Allah and His prophet (peace be upon him.). Allah yields reward to the sincere persons at every step of their way, and no labour and hardship, undertaken in His way, ever goes to waste. I re-emphasize that you must not rank this convention in the same league as other, ordinary, human assemblies. This is a phenomenon that is based purely on the Divine Help, for propagation of Islam.

— Ishtihar 7 December 1892, Majmoo`ah Ishtiharat Vol. I, p. 341

=== Prayer ===
I conclude with the prayer that everyone who travels for [attending] this Convention that is for the sake of Allah: May Allah, the Exalted, be with him, reward him in abundant measure, have mercy on him, ease up for him his circumstances of hardship and anxiety and eliminate his anguish and grief. May He grant him freedom from every single hardship and lay open for him the ways of [achieving] his cherished goals, and raise him up, on the day of Judgment, among those of His servants who are the recipients of His blessings and Mercy. May He be their Guardian in their absence until after their journey comes to an end. O Allah! O Sublime One and Bestower of bounties, the Ever Merciful and One Who Resolves all problems, do grant all these prayers, and grant us Victory over our opponents with scintillating signs, because You alone have all the prowess and power. Ameen! Ameen!!

— Ishtihar 7 December 1892, Majmoo`ah Ishtiharat Vol. I, p. 342

== Program ==
The event begins on Friday with a flag-hoisting ceremony. The national President hoists the flag of the country whereas the Khalifatul Masih, if present, hoists the flag of the Ahmadiyya Muslim Community. After the ceremony, members of Khuddam-ul Ahmadiyya will stand in front of the two flagpoles in order to symbolise the honour and defence of the nation and faith. This continues until the Jalsa ends, although such activity is not carried out throughout the night.

This is immediately followed by an address of the Khalifatul Masih. The program continues until Sunday evening with several speeches on spiritual and moral concepts, by the Khalifatul Masih, but also from the National president, Imams and other Islamic Scholars. In recent years the Community often invites several distinguished non-Ahmadi guests to give short speeches. The television station of the Ahmadiyya Muslim Community, MTA records most of the speeches and broadcasts them live, usually only if the Khalifatul-Masih is present.

The most important part of this event is the performance of five daily prayers in congregation. The ceremony of the International Bay'ah is typically only held in the international Jalsa Salana.

Since all the speeches will be simultaneously translated into several languages, most visitors including those who are foreign can easily listen and understand them easily. Outside the normal sessions, many other facilities are available, including exhibitions, libraries, bookshops, medical counselling including homeopathy and other shops.

The funding for the Jalsa Salana comes from the voluntary donations of Ahmadis. Everyone, including Ahmadis and the guests that they bring with them, are, according with the Islamic tradition, hosted free of charge. Meals are also provided free of charge.

== Venues ==
The Jalsa Salana has developed to become central to the community's major events around the world. The initial venue remained in Qadian, India for many years, as the community became international in its scope, such conventions began to be held elsewhere.

=== Asia ===
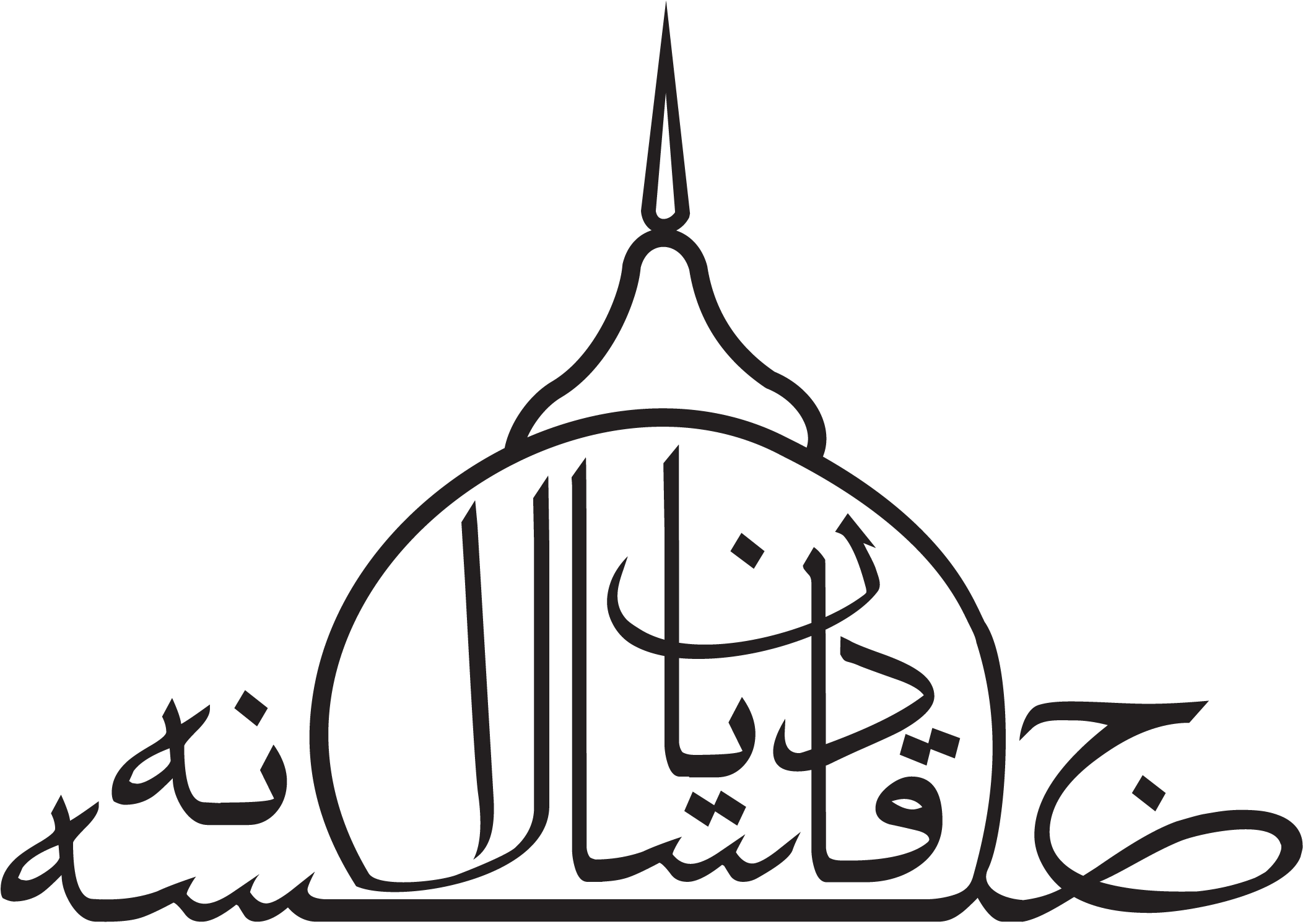
Logo of Jalsa Salana Qadian

==== India ====
India is the birthplace of the community and where the convention first was held in 1891. Jalsa Salana is still held in Qadian, mostly in the month of December. The convention has gone through a rich development over the century and now attracts guests from around the world. Its dates have remained exactly the same since its inception in 1891 and the gathering is an event central to bringing together community guests from outside the Jama'at.

==== Pakistan ====
Jalsa Salana has been held in Pakistan since the partition of the Indian Subcontinent. The Ahmadiyya Muslim Community from Qadian migrated to the newly created Pakistan and settled in Lahore. Thereafter, in 1948, the Community found a tract of arid land and thereupon built the town of Rabwah. The community had been holding its annual convention since then. The attendance reached over 250,000 participants in 1983. Pakistan's government banned the community's gatherings under Ordinance XX, which caused a new wave of persecution of Ahmadis. This caused large number of Ahmadis to migrate abroad. Both the migrants and converts from abroad have come to establish a strong presence in many countries which now hold their respective Jalsas, sometimes attracting large crowds when visited in person by the supreme head of the community, the Khalifa.

=== Africa ===
==== Ghana ====
Jalsa Salana Ghana was held at Saltpond for many years. Since 2008, it is held on a site known as "Bagh-e-Ahmad" spread over 400 acres (1.6 km^{2}) around 60 km from the capital, Accra. The Convention was attended by the Head of the Ahmadiyya Muslim Community, Mirza Masroor Ahmad on two occasions; 2004 and 2008. In 2008, as in 2004, the Caliph toured many countries of West Africa. However, the tour in 2008 was distinctively known as the 'Khilafat Centenary' tour, because 100 years had passed by 2008 since the first inception of Caliphate in Ahmadiyya. In the Jalsa, some of the highlights of the Caliph's several addresses included his love and bond with the Ghanaian Jamaat; the devotion of the Ghanaian Jamaat towards the Khalifatul Masih; the importance of the development of truth and forbearance of every Ahmadi and the refutation of the allegation that Islam was spread by the sword. Moreover, in 2008, the President of Ghana, John Kufuor, attended the gathering and which he congratulated the Ahmadiyya Muslim Community on its Centenary celebrations and referred to the Caliph as a brother, friend and teacher to the people of Ghana. Many participants were reported to have travelled long distances from many of the surrounding countries, some in difficult conditions by bicycle or foot. Tens of thousands of Ahmadis participated on both occasions including 50,000 women in 2008.

==== Nigeria ====
Jalsa Salana Nigeria is held on a site known as "Hadeeqate-e-Ahmad" (Garden of Ahmad) an 85-acre (340,000 m^{2}) stretch of land approximately 40 km from the Capital, Abuja. During the Khilafat Centenary tour of West Africa in 2008, the Caliph inaugurated the 58th Jalsa Salana Nigeria. Other than the Caliphs attendance at the Convention, this was the first event televised live via MTA International. In this Jalsa, the Caliph's addressed many issues such as the importance of honesty as the key to Africa's future development; the need for Ahmadis to strive to nearness to God and the importance of Jalsa Salana.

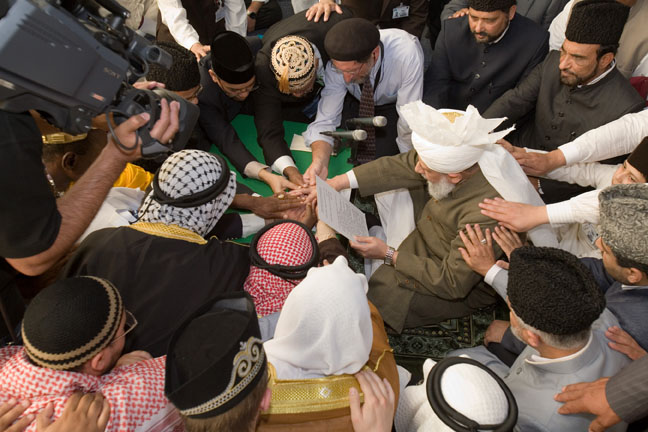
International bay'ah (initiation) ceremony, 2008

=== Europe ===
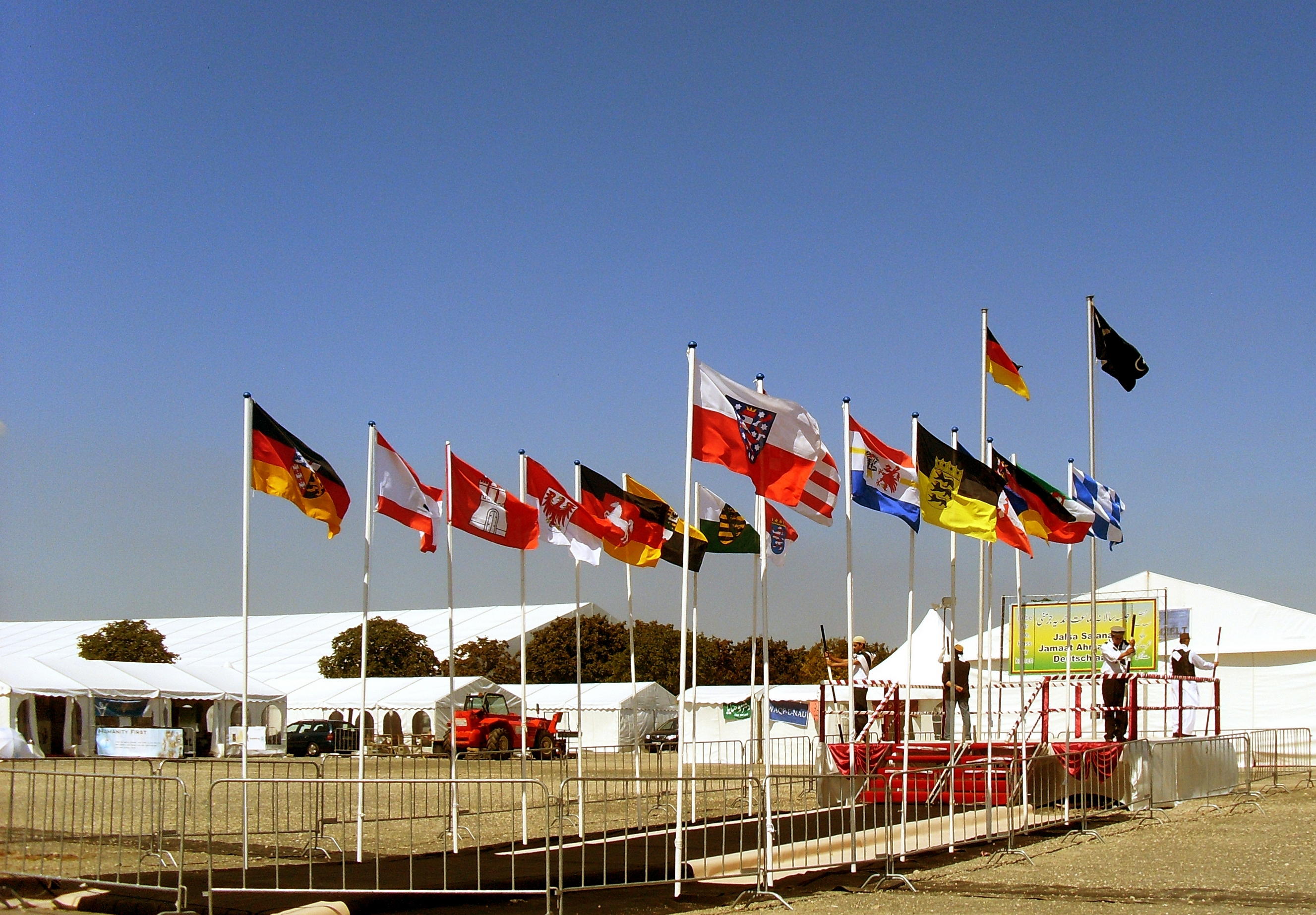
The Liwa-e-Ahmadiyya, the flag of Germany, in front the flags of German states at the Jalsa Salana Germany 2009

==== Germany ====
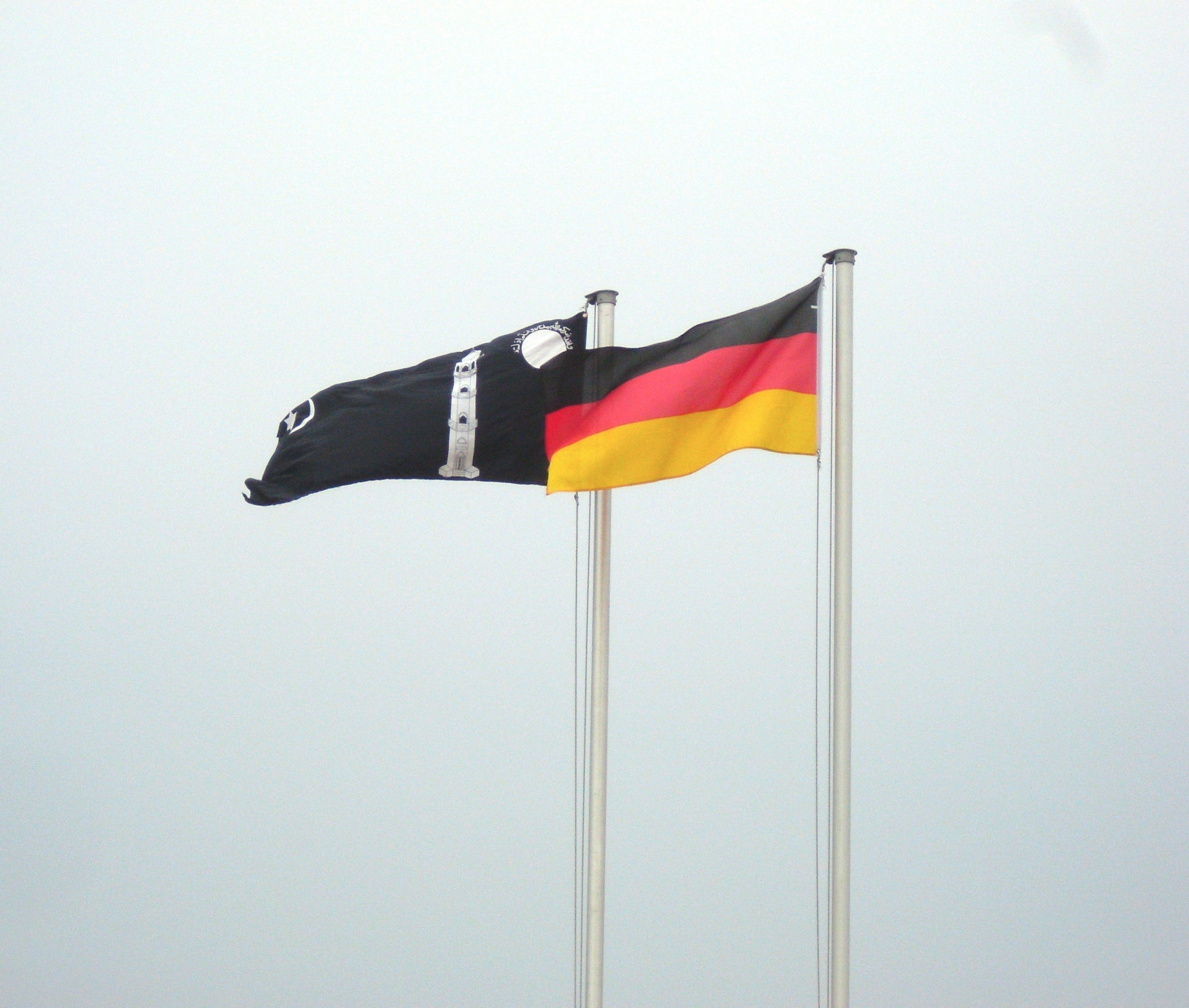
Liwa-e-Ahmadiyya and the Flag of Germany

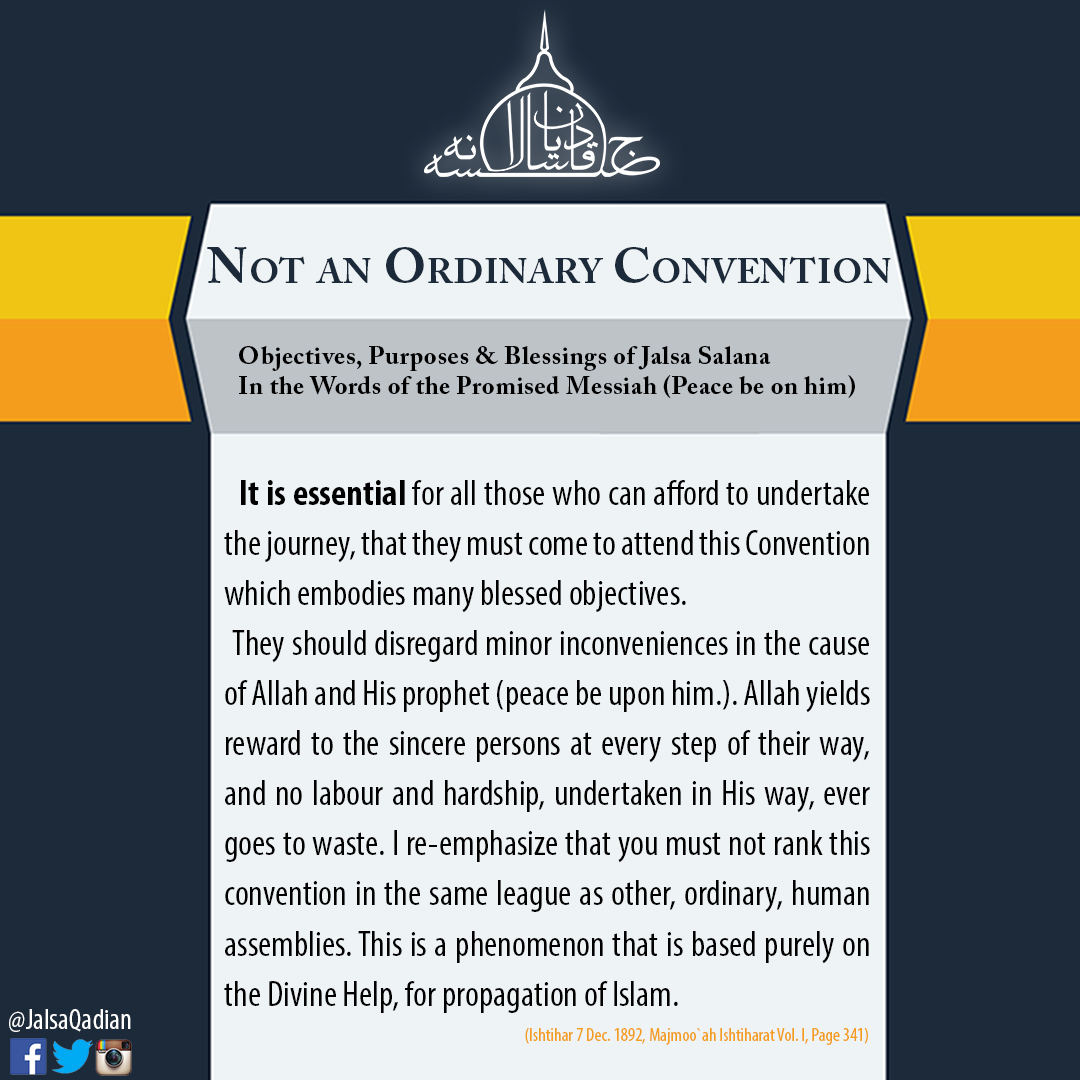
Importance of Jalsa Salana

The first Jalsa Salana in Germany was held in 1975. The Conventions were held on the grounds of the Fazl-e-Umar Mosque in Hamburg-Stellingen. Afterwards, the community bought a site "Nasir Bagh" in Groß-Gerau and held their Convention since 1985. However, the event outgrew the site, and moved to the future location of the Bait-ul Shakour mosque. In 1989 Mirza Tahir Ahmad, the fourth Head of the Ahmadiyya Muslim Community, initiated the construction of 100 mosques in Germany during his attendance at the Jalsa. Since 1995, the Jalsa Salana is held approximately four weeks after the international Jalsa Salana in the UK at the Maimarktgelände in Mannheim. With the number of participants of over 30,000 annually it is the largest Muslim gathering in Europe. Jalsa Salana Germany 2023 at Stuttgart had a record attendance of 47,000.

==== Norway ====
First Jalsa Salana of Norway was held in 1982 at Nor Mosque in Oslo. As the number of members grew, the community rented schools and other venues for the event. Since 2011 has the community held its annual gatherings at the largest mosque in Nordic region, Baitun Nasr in Furuset, Oslo.

==== Switzerland ====
The first Jalsa Salana in Switzerland was held in Zurich in 1983. In 2004 from 3 to 5 September, the 22nd Jalsa Salana was held in the presence of Mirza Masroor Ahmad, the head of the Ahmadiyya Muslim Community, in the multi-purpose hall of Forch near Zurich. The 27th Jalsa Salana Switzerland was held in the hamlet of Wigoltingen from 12 to 14 June 2009.

==== United Kingdom ====
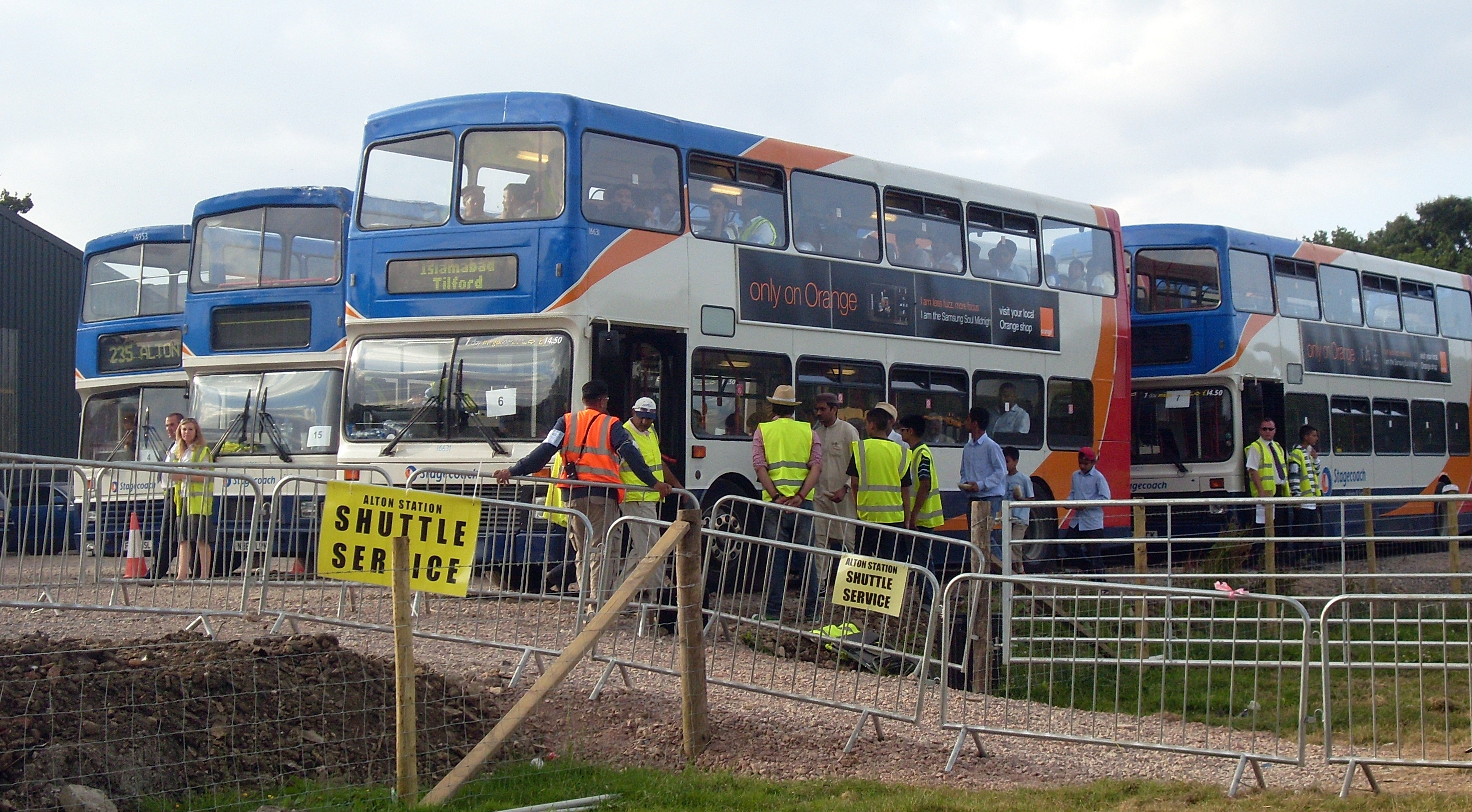
Shuttle service in use

The first Jalsa Salana in the UK took place in 1964. Jalsa Salana UK serves as an International Jalsa, since the Head of the Ahmadiyya Muslim Community, Mirza Masroor Ahmad resides in the country after his migration from Pakistan. This was because it was difficult for Ahmadis to call themselves Muslim or to "pose as Muslims" and therefore was nearly impossible for the Head of the Community at that time to carry out his role as a Khalifatul Masih. From 1985 to 2004, the Ahmadiyya Muslim Community UK used a site near Tilford, officially known as Islamabad, for the Jalsa. Since then, because of rising visitor numbers, the Ahmadiyya Muslim Community UK bought another site near Alton of an area of 208 acres (0.84 km^{2}), named as 'Hadiqatul-Mahdi'. Islamabad has also been used for accommodation purposes and shuttle services are used to attempt to reduce severe traffic congestion. The Jalsa Salana in the UK is usually held on the last weekend of July. The number of participants average around 30,000 annually. In 2017, about 37,000 people from more than 100 countries attended the Jalsa.

=== Americas ===
==== Canada ====
The Jalsa Salana Canada was first held in the year 1976 attended by about 70 people. Its venues have varied over the years initially held in various small-scale rented facilities and later moving to the AMJ national headquarters in Maple, Ontario near the Baitul Islam Mosque. As the attendance kept growing, in the year 2002, the community changed its location to a more suitable venue, at the Mississauga International Center near Pearson International Airport. The average attendance reaches over 17,000 but during the visits of the Khalifa numbers as high as 22,000 have been reported. AMJ Canada has future plans to move the convention to a privately owned and developed property located near the small town of Bradford West Gwillimbury a half-hour drive north of the city of Toronto.

==== United States ====
The First Jalsa Salana in USA was held in 1948, making it the oldest large scale Muslim gathering continually held in the country. Its locations have varied over the decades but is currently held in Harrisburg, at the Pennsylvania Farm Show Complex & Expo Center. Attendance usually peaks when the Khalifa makes a visit in person. In both 2008 and 2012, the registered attendance crossed the 10,000 mark.

=== Oceania ===
==== Fiji ====
Fiji hosted the 39th Jalsa Salana in 2006 and had over 500 people in attendance. Closing remarks were given by Mirza Masroor Ahmad. The Indian High Commissioner to the Fiji Islands, Ajay Singh, discussed perceptions of Islam. Singh also stated that religion was a path to achieving world peace as well as spiritual and economic success.

==== Australia ====
More than 2000 people attend the Australia National Jalsa Salana each year. This Jalsa is held usually over the month of April. It is held in Sydney Australia at the Bait Ul Huda mosque in Marsden Park, the mosque in which Mirza Tahir Ahmad both laid the foundation and opened. The 2006 Australia Jalsa Salana was broadcast live on MTA International as this was the year Mirza Masroor Ahmad visited. During his visit he placed the foundation of the Khilafat Centenary Hall, made in commemoration of the 100th year of khilafat. This hall was then opened in 2008 by the Amir of Australia, as Mirza Masroor Ahmad was not able to visit Australia in that year. Inspection is done usually the night before the Jalsa or in the morning of Jalsa Day by Mahmood Ahmad, Amir of the Australia Ahmadiyya Muslim Community.
