= Bay'ah (Ahmadiyya) =

Pledge of allegiance to the faith in Ahmadiyya Islam

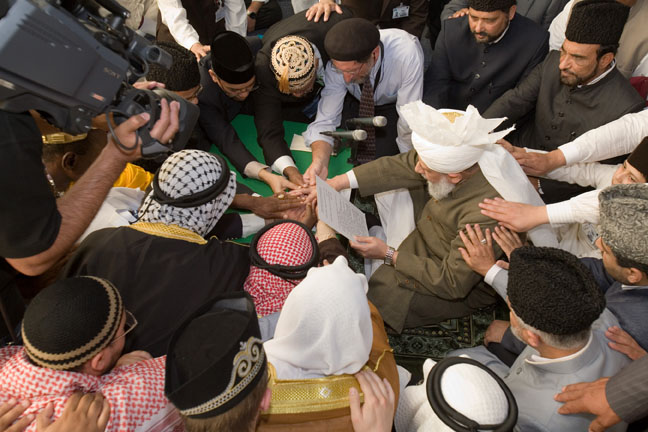
Khalifatul Masih V taking an international Bay'ah in 2008.

Bai'at or Bay'ah (Arabic: بَيْعَة; pledge, initiation; literally a "sale" or a "transaction") is an Ahmadiyya practice of declaring on oath, one's allegiance to a particular leader. In an Islamic religious context, this oath is the standard procedure of pledging allegiance to a religious leader. It is known to have been practiced by the Islamic prophet Muhammad and his successors (caliphs) after him with those wishing to join the Islamic community. Within the Sufi tradition the term is used to refer to the process of initiation into a Sufi order with the idea of commending oneself to a spiritual master in exchange for the spiritual and moral guidance imparted by him. The Bay'ah is a practice that also forms a notable feature within Ahmadiyya Islam. Following the death of a Caliph, the leader of the Community, a pledge of allegiance is taken by the newly chosen Caliph from members of the Community based upon this prophetic model and the bay'ah is the standard procedure for formally joining the Ahmadiyya Muslim Community.

Since 1993, a large Bay'ah is held on an international scale every year during the annual gathering of the Community. The Bay'ah is taken by the caliph at whose hand new converts pledge their allegiance and old members of the Community can reaffirm their pledges. The Bay'ah comprises the shahadah, prayers of repentance and a promise to abide by the ten conditions stipulated by Mirza Ghulam Ahmad for joining the Community.

== Bay'ah (Ahmadiyya) ==
The tradition was originally started by the Islamic prophet Muhammad and continued by the Rightly Guided Caliphs.

The concept of bay'ah is considered very important to Ahmadi Muslims. Mirza Ghulam Ahmad, after claiming to be divinely appointed as the Mujaddid of Islam, took the first bay'ah in 1889 at Ludhiana. After this, many individuals travelled long distances to Qadian to be initiated in the Ahmadiyya Muslim Community. The practice was continued by his successors.

The members of the community form five or seven lines in front of the caliph at the ceremony to represent the continents of the world. Officials of the community organisation and other people who have worked for the community or are otherwise selected for this ceremony are present in these lines. Members of the community all over the world join the ceremony live through TV coverage by the community's own satellite channel MTA. The members and those who want to become members place their hands on the back of the person in their front, as is known from the tradition of the early Muslims at the time of Muhammad, and so form chains of physical contact with the caliph. This physical contact is seen necessary only for those present at the ceremony. The oath of allegiance or Bay'ah is led by the caliph; he recites, and the members of the community repeat after him. The oath includes the shahadah, prayers of repentance and a promise to abide by the ten conditions of Bai'at.

After the oath is taken, the caliph leads the members in silent prayer. At the end, all members of the congregation, which includes those participating around the world, prostrate themselves as an expression of gratitude to God. This prostration is not done in any particular direction, but it is led by the caliph.

Since the first International Bay'ah, some traditions have developed. Foremost, the caliph wears a green coat that belonged to Mirza Ghulam Ahmad at the ceremony. The coat was lent to the fourth caliph for the ceremony by Mirza Ghulam Ahmad's sister, and it was later donated to the caliphate at the request of the fifth caliph, Mirza Masroor Ahmad.

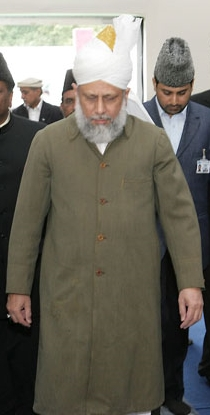
Khalifatul Masih V at the International Bay'ah Ceremony 2007 wearing the green coat of Mirza Ghulam Ahmad.

== The ten conditions ==
The Ahmadiyya bay'ah includes promises to:

1. Refrain from shirk, or polytheism.
2. Control one's passions and avoid falsehood, fornication, adultery, trespasses of the eye, debauchery, dissipation, cruelty, dishonesty, mischief, and rebellion.
3. Pray five times daily, try one's best to offer the tahajjud (night prayer) regularly, invoke salawat (blessings) on Muhammad, ask daily forgiveness for sins, and remember the bounties of God and to praise and glorify him.
4. Cause no harm to others generally, and Muslims in particular, neither by words nor by actions.
5. Remain faithful to God in all circumstances of life, and be ready to face suffering.
6. Refrain from following un-Islamic customs and lustful inclinations, and submit to the authority of the Qur'an.
7. Give up pride and vanity and be in humble, cheerful, forbearing, and meek.
8. Hold faith, the honor of faith, and the cause of Islam dearer than life, wealth, honor, children and all other dear ones.
9. Keep occupied in the service of God's creatures for his sake only and endeavor to benefit mankind.
10. Enter into a bond of brotherhood with Mirza Ghulam Ahmad, pledging obedience to him in everything good, for the sake of Allah, and remain faithful to it till the day of his/her death.

== International Bay'at ==
In 1993 Mirza Tahir Ahmad, the fourth Ahmadiyya Caliph, internationalised the Bay'ah through Muslim Television Ahmadiyya International (MTA) by which people from all over the world were now able to partake in this pledge which would be simultaneously translated into 12 different languages. Since then, The international oath of allegiance has taken place every year at the annual gatherings. Ahmad often claimed that this was the historical fulfillment of the Pentecost that was destined to occur at the time of the Second Coming.

== See also ==
- Bay'ah
- Pledge of the Tree
- Ten Conditions of Bai'at
