= Mahmood Mosque =

Mahmood Mosque may refer to:

- Mahmood Mosque, Haifa, Israel
- Mahmood Mosque (Malmö), Sweden
- Mahmood Mosque, Regina, Canada
- Mahmood Mosque, Zurich, Switzerland
