= MTA1 World =

Muslim television channel

MTA1 WORLD
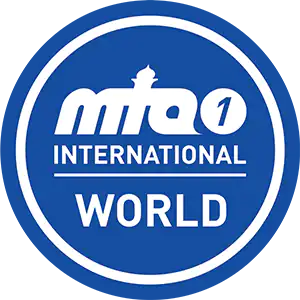
- Country: United Kingdom
- Broadcast area: International
- Network: MTA International
- Headquarters: United Kingdom

Programming
- Languages: English, Urdu, Arabic
- Picture format: 1080i HDTV (downscaled to 16:9 576i for the SDTV-satellite feed)

Ownership
- Sister channels: MTA2HD Europe; MTA3 العربية; MTA4 Africa; MTA5 Africa; MTA6 Asia; MTA7HD Asia; MTA8HD America; MTA 8+3

History
- Launched: January 1994
- Former names: Ahmadiyya Muslim Presentation; MTA International; MTA1 Al-Awala; MTA1

Links
- Website: www.mta.tv

Availability

Terrestrial
- RBN Network Suriname: Channel 5.3

Streaming media
- Website: Watch live (international)
- YouTube: Watch Live
- TuneIn Radio: Listen Live (original & English & Urdu)

MTA1 WORLD or just MTA1 is the first television channel of the MTA International satellite network. It was launched on 1 January 1994 and was a continuation of AMP or 'Ahmadiyya Muslim Presentation'. After the launch of sister channels, the channel was renamed as MTA1. However, it is still loosely referred to as MTA or MTA International.

== History ==
=== Background ===
The channel was established by Mirza Tahir Ahmad and became the first Muslim channel to specifically broadcast a variety of Islamic programmes. Its programmes are broadcast on the Sky UK platform, through Astra 2. The purpose of the channel was initially to primarily broadcast the sermons of the Khalifa.

=== Electronic program guide ===
In September 2001, MTA began its electronic program guide when the channel launched on the Sky UK platform on Channel 675 as a free-to-air channel. Initially, the EPG number was relocated to 787, but in 2019, the number was moved to 731.

=== HD Broadcast ===
MTA1 began its HD broadcast on the Astra 2 in May 2022.

== Programs ==
The channel broadcasts a variety of programs in various global languages for the benefit of its international community. Programs are broadcast mainly in Urdu or English, but several programs are also simultaneously translated and broadcast in other languages such as English, German, Bengali, French, Urdu and others. An example of this is the program Friday Sermon which is translated live simultaneously in at least 8 languages including Arabic, Swahili and Indonesian. This is later translated into more languages like Russian and Spanish etc.

=== Friday Sermon ===
The Friday Sermon was the first program aired on MTA International in 1992 and is MTA's longest-running programme. The caliph, currently Mirza Masroor Ahmad, delivers the Friday Sermon, from the Mubarak Mosque in Tilford. Through MTA therefore, the Imam is able to address not just the congregation, but also the entire world. It gives the Imam a chance to advise all Muslims at the same time on urgent matters that face them.

=== Question and Answer Session ===
Mirza Tahir Ahmad, the late Fourth Caliph of the Ahmadiyya Muslim Community answers questions from guests in sessions held around the world. Questions included, why do only women in Islam have to cover themselves? How can there be a prophet after the Prophet Muhammad? What is the future of western society? Are natural disasters a punishment from God? The Caliph’s style blended knowledge with humour allows for providing thought-provoking answers to common questions.

=== Bustan-e-Waqfe Nau and Gulshan-e-Waqfe Nau ===
Mirza Masroor Ahmad, accompanies Waqfe Nau children in the class in a learning but welcoming environment. There are three types of classes with reference to Gulshan-e-Waqfe Nau.

- Bustan-e-Waqfe Nau: This is with boys and girls under the age of 12
- Gulshan-e-Waqfe Nau Atfal: This is with boys between the ages of 12 and 15
- Gulshan-e-Waqfe Nau Khuddam: This is with boys above the age of 15
- Gulshan-e-Waqfe Nau Nasirat: This is with girls above the age of 12

=== Intekhab-e-Sukhan ===
Intikhab-e-Sukhan is hosted by Mubarak Siddique that features popular videos and nazm, or poetry. Viewers can send messages to be read live on air and request particular nazms. The programme begins with a hamd, a poem expressing love and devotion to God, followed by a Naʽat praising the Prophet Muhammad. Intikhab-e-Sukhan includes poetry from some of the most exceptional poets of past and present. Couplets composed by Mirza Ghulam Ahmad are regularly featured.

=== Faith Matters ===
An Interactive program in English which allows viewers the opportunity to ask questions relating to faith in general. Questions asked vary widely in nature.

=== Rah-e-Huda ===
An Interactive program in Urdu which allows viewers the opportunity to ask questions relating to specifically Ahmadiyyat. Some of the questions asked include, concerning the second coming of the Messiah in the latter days, the prophecies, the death of Jesus and the Finality of Prophethood. The questions can be asked live via phone, fax, text or email.

=== Shotter Shondane ===
An Interactive program in Bengali which allows viewers the opportunity to ask questions mainly relating to Ahmadiyyat. The questions can be asked via phone or fax.
