= Nasir Mosque, Gothenburg =

First mosque in Sweden

Nasir Mosque
- Nasir Moskén
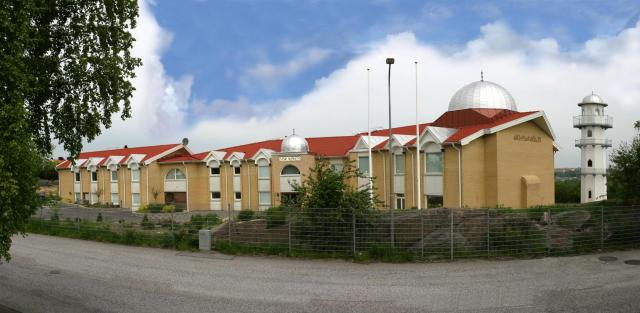

Religion
- Affiliation: Islam
- Branch/tradition: Ahmadiyya

Location
- Location: Tolvskillingsgatan 1, 414 82
- Interactive map of Nasir Mosque
- Coordinates: 57°40′35.5″N 11°54′52.1″E

Architecture
- Type: mosque
- Style: Islamic
- Established: 1976
- Construction cost: around £125,000

Specifications
- Capacity: 400
- Dome: 2
- Minaret: 1
- Site area: 7,000 square metres (75,000 sq ft)

Nasir Mosque (Swedish: Nasir Moskén; Urdu: مسجد ناصر) is mosque in located on the a hill in Western Gothenburg, Sweden, established in 1975. Completed in 1976, it is widely regarded as the first purpose-built mosque in Sweden and one of the earliest permanent Islamic places of worship in the country, and in Scandinavia. It was built by the Ahmadiyya Muslim Community and serves as a centre for worship and community activities.

The mosque is located on a site of approximately 7,000 square metres (75,000 sq ft) and was constructed at a cost of around £125,000 (1975) (equivalent to £1.15 million or US$1.47 million in 2024). It has a capacity of 400 worshippers.

== History ==
The foundation stone of Nasir Mosque was laid on 27 September 1975 by Mirza Nasir Ahmad, the third caliph of the Ahmadiyya Muslim Community, during his visit to Sweden, and the following year it was inaugurated on 20 August 1976. The inauguration ceremony was attended by more than 600 guests from various countries, including representatives of the press and Christian churches. The opening ceremony was recorded and broadcast on television and radio.

=== Expansion ===
By the mid-1990s, the original mosque building was considered insufficient to meet the needs of its growing congregation. During the fourth caliph, Mirza Tahir Ahmad, trip to Sweden, a committee was formed to oversee redevelopment of the mosque which was chaired by Mamoon-ur-Rashid. Initial plans involved adding an additional floor to the existing structure, however, these were later abandoned in favor of a completely new design.

Progress was temporarily delayed due to the land on which the mosque stood being held on lease from the local municipality. Negotiations followed regarding ownership and pricing, after which the land was purchased outright in 1997 for approximately kr 500,000. A revised architectural plan was subsequently approved, providing for a two-storey mosque building. Funding for the reconstruction was raised primarily through community donations, with pledges eventually totaling several million kronor. The project progressed through the late 1990s, with construction completed despite seasonal and technical challenges.

=== Vandalism ===
The mosque has been the subject of threats and acts of vandalism. Following the September 11 attacks, the mosque received bomb threats, and in a separate incident, the windows of the mosque were smashed.

== Architecture ==
The mosque was designed by White Architects in the style of a Swedish-house with domes and a minaret, marking its Islamic identity. The building also includes residence for the Imam of the mosque. The total floor area of the mosque is approximately 325 square meters, of which the prayer hall is 80 square meters. The redesigned mosque in 2001 included expanded prayer spaces and a newly constructed minaret, which received municipal approval during the building process.

== Gallery ==
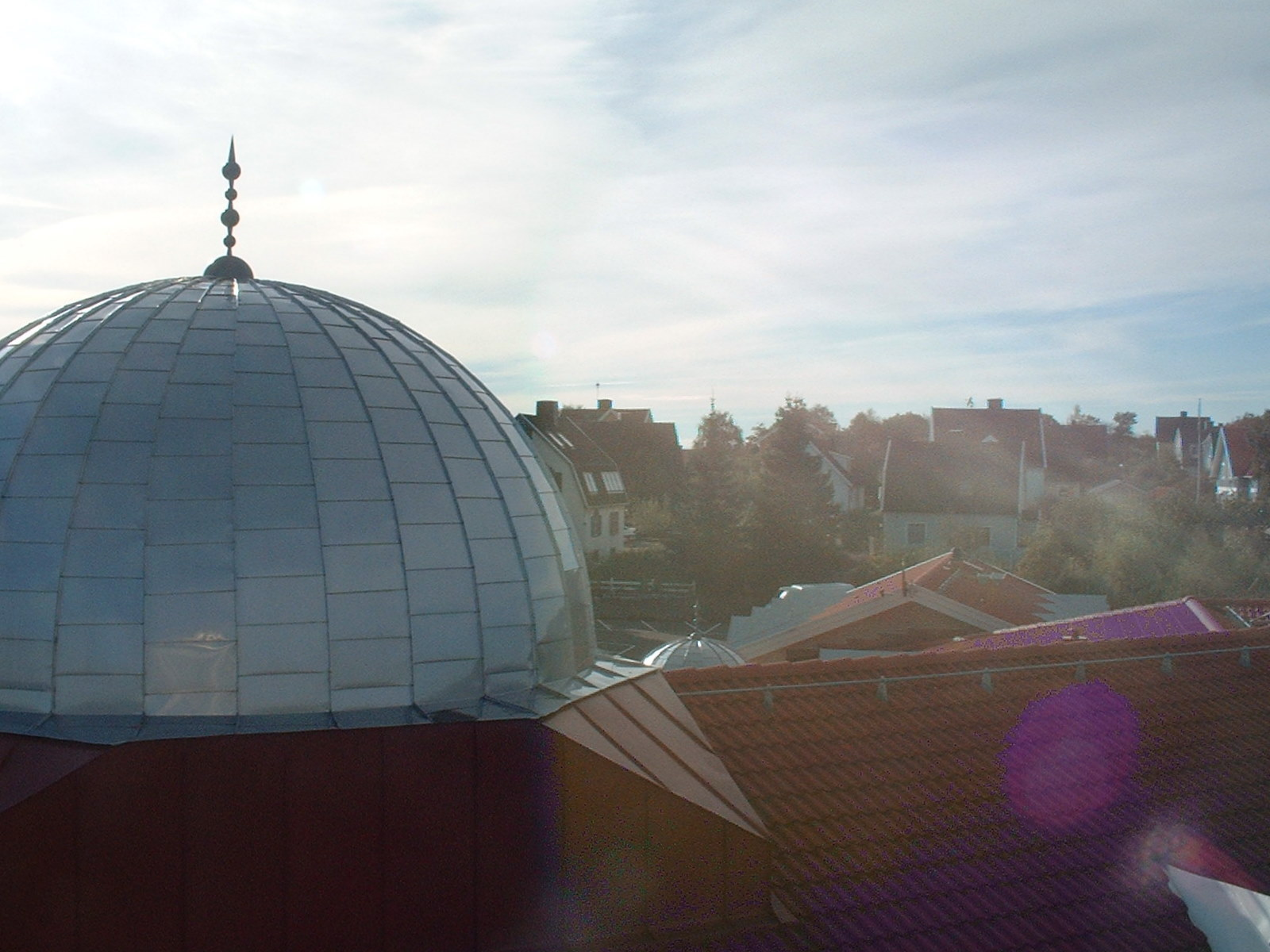
the dome of the mosque

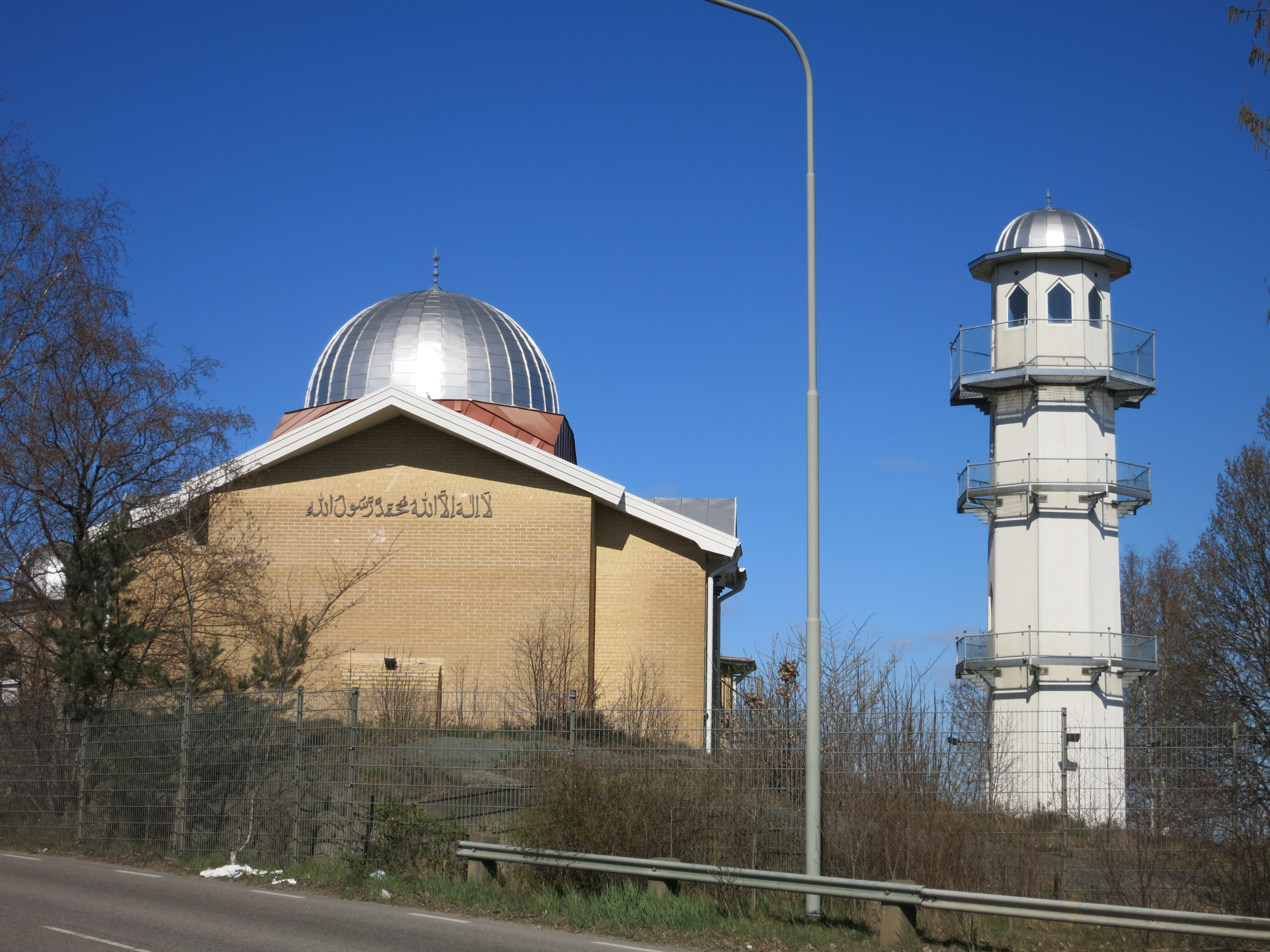
Dome and Minaret

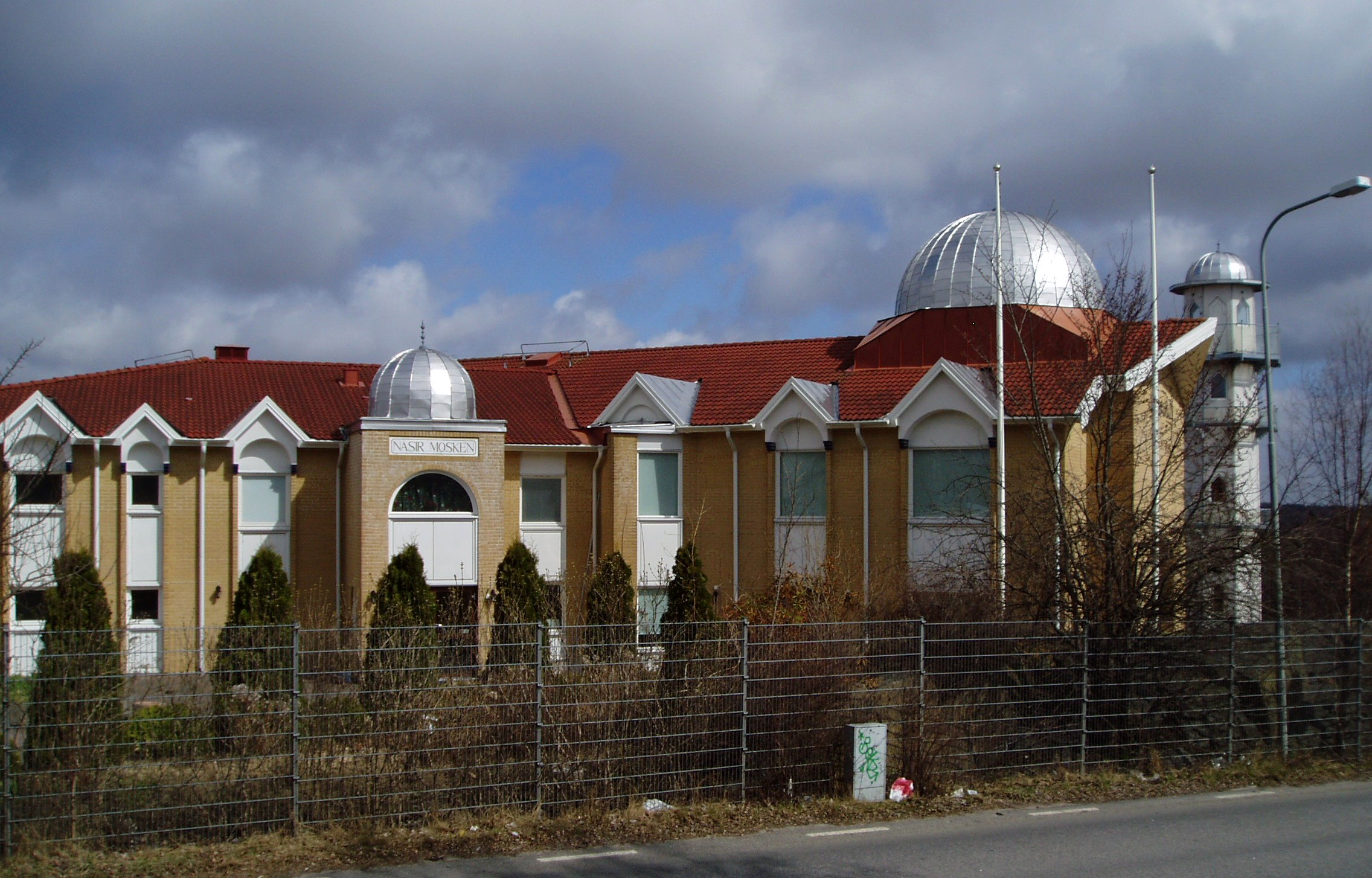
the mosque as seen from the road

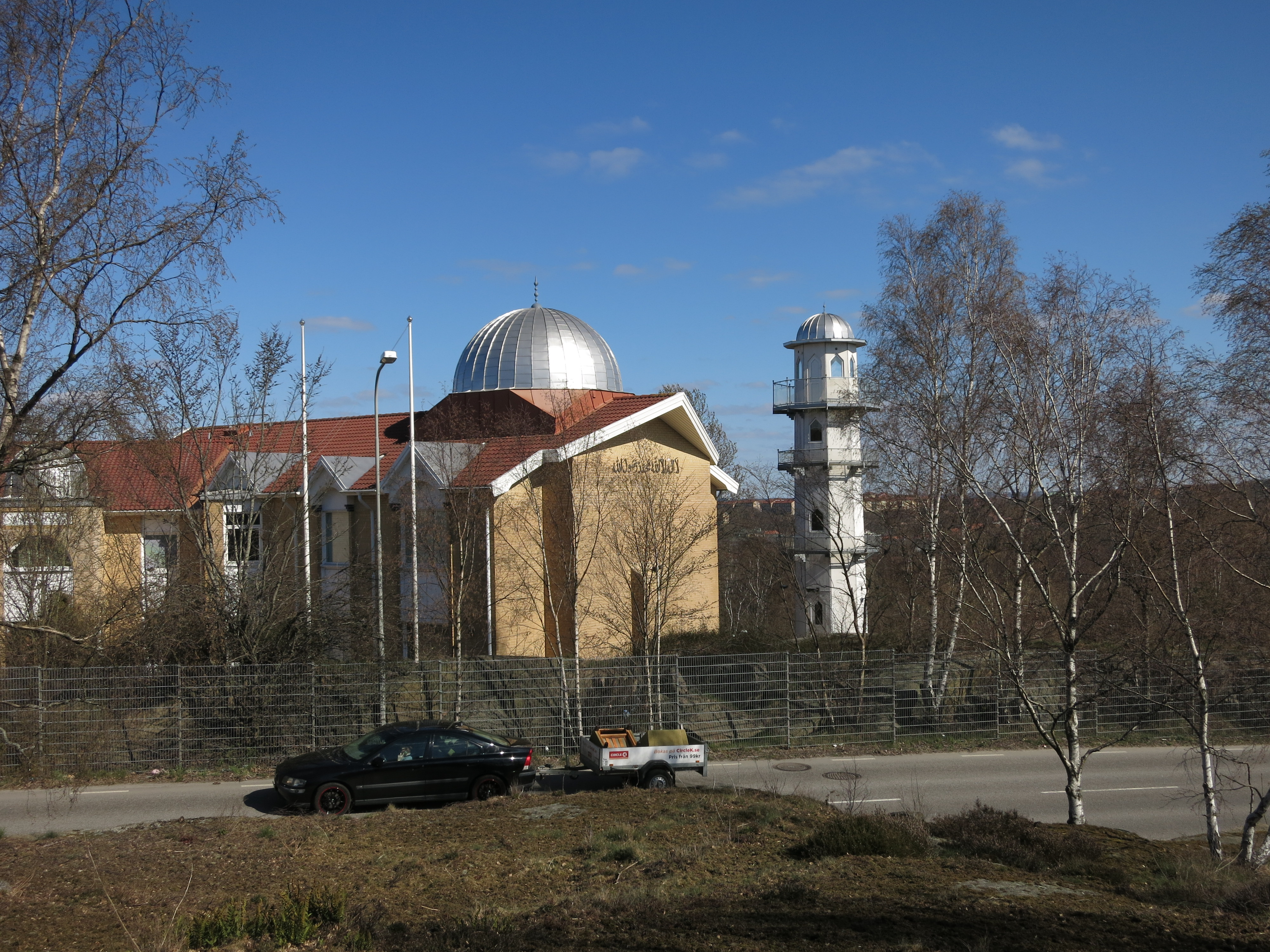
The mosque from afar

== See also ==
- Mahmood Mosque (Malmö)
- Ahmadiyya in Sweden
- Islam in Sweden
