= Shotter =

English-language surname

Shotter is a surname. Notable people with the surname include:

- Constance Shotter (1911–1989), British actress
- Edward Shotter (1933–2019), British Anglican priest and author
- David Shotter (1939 – 2021) British Archaeologist
- Ralph Shotter (1907–1994), British actor
- Spencer Proudfoot Shotter (1855–1920), Canadian businessman
- Winifred Shotter (1904–1996), British actress

== See also ==
- Thomas Shotter Boys (1803–1874) English painter and lithographer.
- MTA1 World#Shotter Shondane Bengali language Islamic website
