= Mahmood Mosque (Malmö) =

Mosque in Malmö, Skåne, Sweden

- Mahmoodmoskén
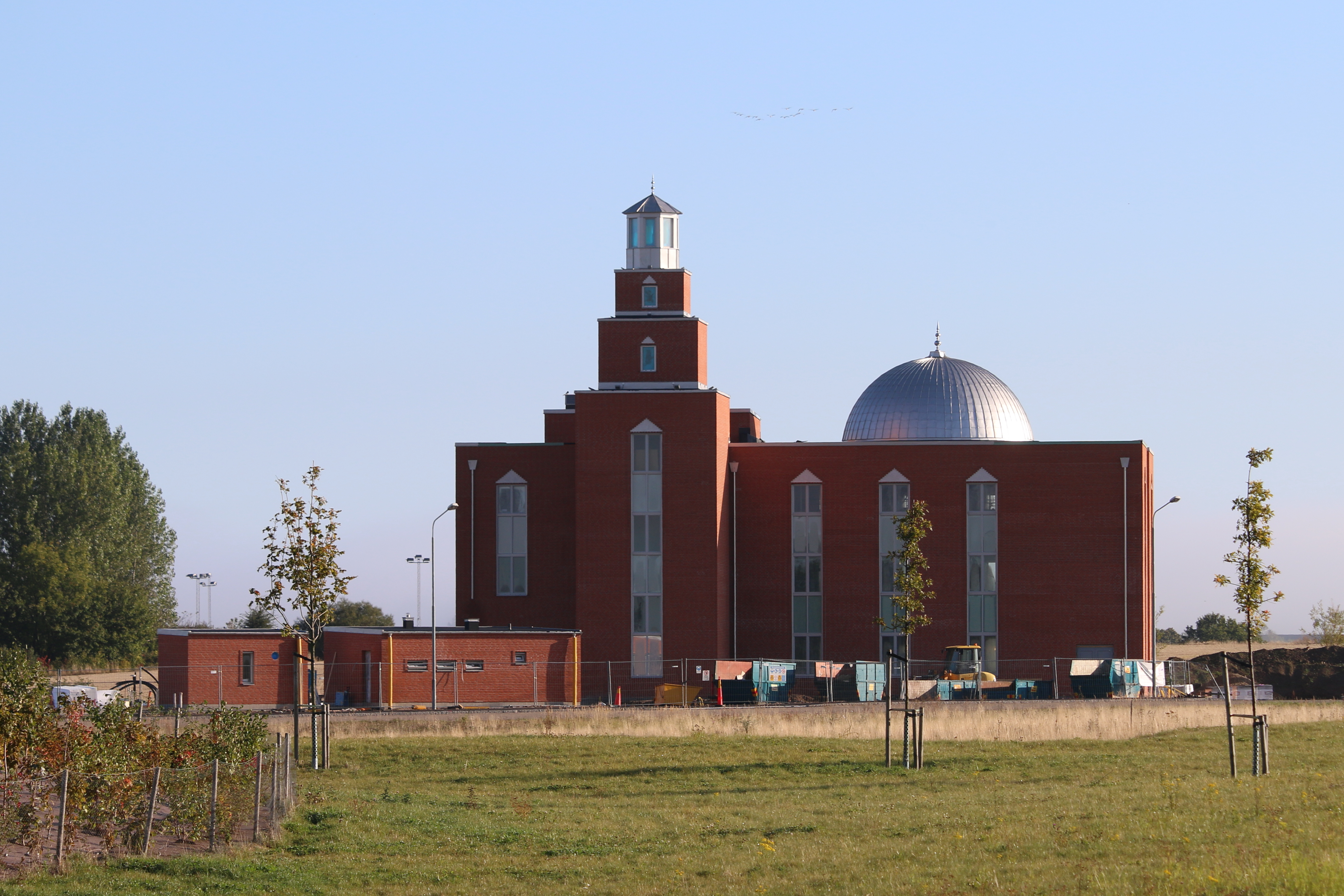

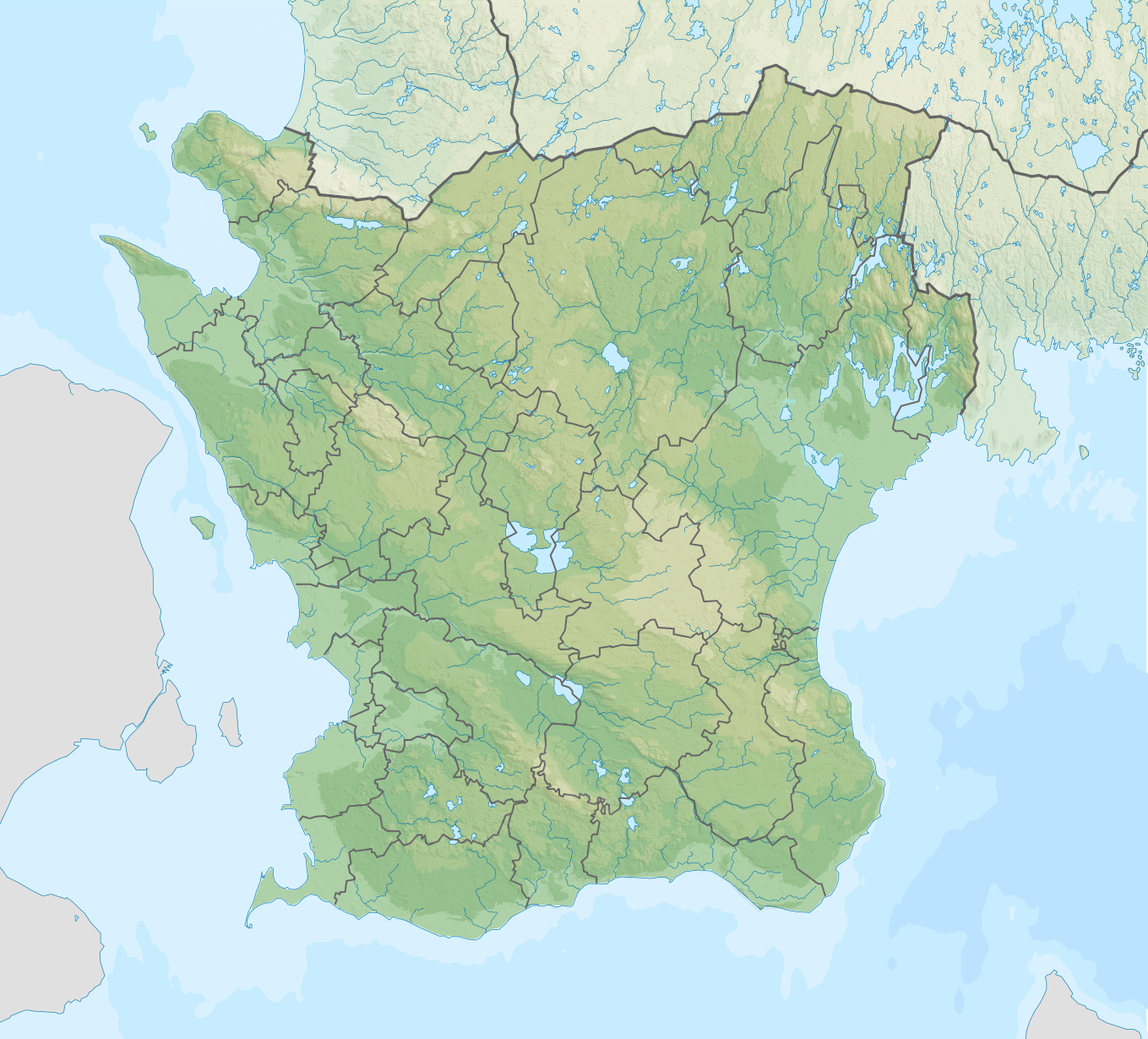
- Location within Skåne

Religion
- Affiliation: Islam
- Branch/tradition: Ahmadiyya

Location
- Location: Malmö, Skåne, Sweden
- Interactive map of Mahmood Mosque
- Coordinates: 55°33′59″N 13°04′56″E

Architecture
- Type: Mosque
- Established: 13 May 2016
- Construction cost: SEK37.5 million
- Capacity: 1,700 worshipers

The Mahmood Mosque (Swedish: Mahmoodmoskén) is a mosque in Malmö, Skåne County, Sweden.

== History ==
Construction of the mosque started in 1999. The mosque was officially opened on 13 May 2016 during Friday sermon delivered by Mirza Masroor Ahmad and inaugurated a day after in a ceremony attended by the Chairperson of Malmö City Council.

== Architecture ==
The 2,000 m^{2} mosque complex has 5 buildings, including two-bedroom accommodation, a sports hall, offices and a library. The mosque consists of two prayer halls, one for male and the other for female worshippers. In total, the mosque can accommodate up to 1,700 worshipers. It was constructed with a total cost of SEK37.5 million.

== See also ==
- Nasir Mosque, Gothenburg
- Ahmadiyya in Sweden
- List of mosques in Scandinavia
