= MTA Ghana =

Muslim television channel in Ghana

- Type: Religious, Non-profit
- Country: Ghana
- Broadcast area: Greater Accra, Central Region, Kumasi
- Network: MTA International
- Headquarters: Wahab Adam Studios, Accra

Programming
- Languages: English, Arabic, Twi, Fanti, Hausa, Wala
- Picture format: 1080i HDTV (downscaled to 16:9 576i for terrestrial feed)

Ownership
- Owner: Al-Shirkatul Islamiyyah
- Sister channels: MTA Gambia

History
- Launched: January 15, 2021

Links
- Website: mtaghana.tv

MTA Ghana is a 24-hour Islamic TV channel that was launched by the MTA International network, the first country-exclusive channel by the network, and based in Accra, Ghana. It is broadcast on the terrestrial platform and airs content in a number of local languages like Twi, Fante and Hausa. The channel, which is operated by the Wahab Adam Studio, is run by 17 full-time staff, and over 60 volunteers for various departments.

== History ==
Prior to the launch of MTA Ghana, the MTA network covered the country through its two other satellite-based African channels, MTA Africa 1 and MTA Africa 2, the latter of which was mainly for viewers of West Africa, which were launched back in August of 2016.
