= Mahmood Mosque, Regina =

Mosque in Regina, Saskatchewan, Canada

Mahmood Mosque
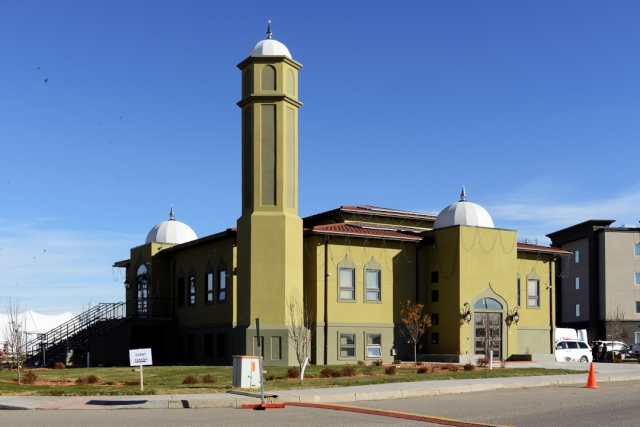

- Location within Saskatchewan

Religion
- Affiliation: Islam
- Branch/tradition: Ahmadiyya
- Ecclesiastical or organizational status: Mosque
- Status: Active

Location
- Location: Regina, Saskatchewan
- Country: Canada
- Interactive map of Mahmood Mosque
- Coordinates: 50°27′03″N 104°31′41″W

Architecture
- Type: Mosque architecture
- Completed: 2016

Specifications
- Capacity: 500 worshippers
- Dome: 2
- Minaret: 1

The Mahmood Mosque is an Ahmadi Muslim mosque in Regina, the capital of the Canadian province of Saskatchewan. It is Saskatchewans first purpose-built mosque.

== See also ==
- Islam in Canada
- List of mosques in Canada
