= MTA International =

Islamic TV Station

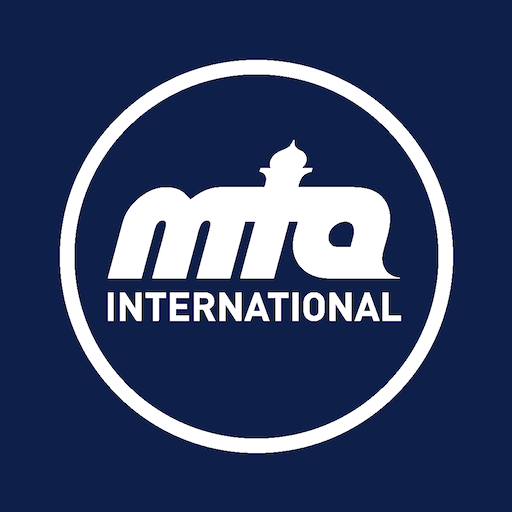
- Type: Non-profit
- Country: International
- Availability: Worldwide
- Motto: Reaching the Corners of the Earth
- Headquarters: Baitul Futuh Studios
- Owner: Al-Shirkatul Islamiyyah
- Launch date: January 7, 1994
- Official website: mta.tv

Muslim Television Ahmadiyya International (MTA), a globally-broadcasting, nonprofit satellite television network and a division of Al-Shirkatul Islamiyyah, was established in 1994 and launched the world's first Islamic TV channel to broadcast globally. It serves as the official media outlet for the Ahmadiyya Muslim Community, based in Islamabad, Tilford and funded entirely from donations by the members of the community. The network operates ten 24-hour channels for different regions of the world, including terrestrial TV as well as satellite television.

== History ==
The idea of a medium for the live broadcasting of media in the Ahmadiyya community takes its root in March 1989 when the community in Mauritius, followed by the community in Germany would dial the Fazl Mosque in London to listen to the caliph's Friday sermon over a telephone call. The sermon would be listened on loudspeakers of the mosques in the respective countries. This encouraged the communities of other countries to also dial in every Friday, overwhelming phone lines.

=== Initial Launch ===
This led to the inception of Ahmadiyya Muslim Presentation (AMP) in August 1992 which would broadcast the weekly Friday sermons, and in 1993, the first Jalsa Salana to be broadcast live. This became the first TV channel run by the Ahmadiyya Muslim community as well as the first TV channel to broadcast Islamic programmes globally. Initially, the studio and video library shared a 10 by 10 ft (3.0 by 3.0 m) room in the Mahmood Hall of Fazl Mosque equipped with a single video camera and "few ordinary flood lights". The programming for AMP gradually increased until 7 January 1994, when AMP was rebranded to MTA and increased its daily broadcasting hours from four to 12 hours, and in April 1996, to 24 hours.

In 2005, MTA began its live online broadcast and recorded the Jalsa Salana in High-definition video.

=== MTA 3 Al-Arabiya ===
On 23 March 2007. MTA 3 Al-Arabiya was launched, which was an entirely Arabic channel, primarily for viewers of the Middle East.

=== MTA Africa ===
On 1 August 2016, MTA Africa 1 and 2 were inaugurated by Mirza Masroor Ahmad, broadcasting programmes in African languages as well as programmes from MTA 1. In September 2024, MTA Africa became a member of the African Union of Broadcasting after having applied in 2022.

=== 2020 era ===
From 27 May 2020, known as Khilafat Day for Ahmadis, MTA rearranged its channels according to regions and introduced new channels. These new channels were formerly MTA1 broadcasting on different satellites, converted to cater viewers of specific regions by broadcasting programmes in specific languages for each region. MTA 1 on Galaxy 19 became MTA8 HD AMERICA with programmes in Urdu, English, French and Spanish.

Changes to MTA Channels
Channels	Satellite(s)	Formerly	Region
MTA1 World	Astra 2G Hipasat 30W-5	MTA1	Americas (excluding Brazil & Canada) Europe
MTA2HD Europe	Hotbird 13C (HD)	MTA2	Europe Middle East
MTA3 العربية	Eutelsat 7 West A Galaxy 19 (HD) Hotbird 13B Optus D2 Palapa-D	MTA3	Europe MENA North America Oceania Southeast Asia
MTA4 Africa	SES-5	MTA Africa 1	Sub-Saharan Africa
MTA5 Africa	Astra 2F	MTA Africa 2	West Africa
MTA6 Asia	AsiaSat 7	MTA1	Asia Oceania
MTA7HD Asia	Eutelsat 70B (HD)	MTA1	Europe Middle East South Asia
MTA8HD America	Galaxy 19 (HD)	MTA1	North America
MTA8HD America + 3	Galaxy 19 (HD)	MTA 1+3	North America

== Channels ==
MTA runs 10 channels 24/7:

=== Worldwide ===
- MTA1 World was the first channel launched by the MTA network and is the primary channel broadcasting programmes in English, Urdu and occasionally archived programmes in Arabic and French, and has multiple audio tracks to provide translations for certain programmes such as the Friday Sermon. Its broadcast coverage used to cover the entire globe before MTA1 on some satellites were converted into regional channels. It is mainly broadcast in the UK/Europe and parts of South America, as well as being broadcast on terrestrial TV in Suriname.

=== Europe and MENA ===
- MTA2 Europe focuses on programmes aimed specifically at European and Middle Eastern viewers by broadcasting programmes in a range of European languages, commonly French and German, in addition to English and Urdu, some of which are also broadcast on MTA1. It was launched in April 2004. MTA2, also has similar audio tracks for translations, similar to MTA1, where the Bengali Track is sometimes switched with Spanish. It began its HD broadcast on 1 February 2018, on the HotBird 13C and is streamed online.
- MTA3 Al-Arabia is an all-Arabic channel launched on 23 March 2007 specifically for Arabic viewers in the Middle East and North Africa. It is also broadcast in other parts of the world such as Europe, Indonesia and North America (where it is broadcast in HD). Initially, it was broadcast on the Egyptian-owned Nilesat 201 before being barred and eventually being broadcast on the European Eutelsat 7 West A instead, in 2008.

=== Africa ===
MTA Africa-based content is typically produced in the various African studios, such as the Wahab Adam Studios, based in Ghana. There are over 10 branches as part of the network which oversee 4 African channels as part of the MTA International network:

- MTA4 Africa (formerly known as MTA Africa 1) is the fourth satellite-based television channel of the MTA International network. It was launched in early August 2016, broadcasting specifically for viewers of Sub-Saharan Africa. The channel is broadcast on the Astra 2F, and is also broadcast on terrestrial TV in Belize. Programmes aired are usually in English, French or Swahili language.
- MTA5 Africa is a sister channel to MTA4, launched alongside it, and is primarily for the viewers of West Africa and airs programmes in a number of African languages, notably Hausa, Krio, Twi and Yoruba. It is the former MTA Africa 2 channel.
- MTA Ghana is a terrestrial channel and the first country-exclusive channel part of the MTA network which aims to air programmes specifically for Ghanaian viewers. It was launched in January 2021 and broadcasts programmes in English and local languages, like Twi and Hausa.
- MTA Gambia is a terrestrial channel under the MTA International Africa division which broadcasts in The Gambia. The channel substantially broadcasts programmes in English and Mandinka languages.

=== Asia ===
- MTA6 Asia broadcasts programs which are specific to Pakistan (and by extension South Asia) and Indonesia. It airs programmes in Urdu, English and Indonesian, with some programs carrying additional translations in other languages, like Bengali.
- MTA7 Asia primarily caters to the viewers of the Indian subcontinent, as it airs programs specific to the region. The channel also provides translations and content in local languages such as Bengali, Malayalam and Tamil.

=== Americas ===
- MTA8 America is broadcast in North America, with content in English and Urdu as well as French and Spanish. In the Americas, MTA also runs MTA 8 + 3, which broadcasts MTA programmes with a delay of three hours. This began in February 2008, primarily for the viewers in the West coast.

== Members ==
The majority of its workers are volunteers with just a small percentage of paid full-time staff. Out of the 300 staff members that work in MTA's London offices, 90% are volunteers who dedicate their time to assist in the running of the network.

== Online Media Services ==
MTA has introduced a number of apps for the benefit of their viewers across a variety of platforms on all devices such as TV, Phone, Tablets, Desktops etc. The network also makes use of social media to live stream their channels on websites such as Facebook and Twitter as well as YouTube to broadcast all four channels, live.

In addition, as MTA International operates globally and in many different countries, many countries (where Ahmadiyya may have a significant or even minor presence) have their own official MTA YouTube channel for their specific region or language, which allows them to stream regional events that may not be broadcast on MTA but may be streamed on YouTube such as Jalsa Salana Canada was streamed on the YouTube channel MTA Canada, as well as this, it allows specific countries to stream live translations for key programmes such as the Friday Sermon.

There are also applications for mobile and personal devices on a variety of platform such as Roku TV, Apple TV, Android and iOS. On 2 August (at Jalsa Salana UK 2019), a range of MTA applications were launched for Smart TV brands such as Samsung, Android TV, Amazon Fire TV, Panasonic, LG, Sony and Philips.

== National Studios ==
In most countries throughout the world in which there is a presence of the Ahmadiyya Muslim Community there is often a national MTA Studio. To date, over 20 studios have been established in various countries which produce content in local languages, such as the studios in Australia, Canada, Germany, Kababir, Mauritius and Indonesia, among others. Among these, 11 studios in Africa have been established as part of the MTA International Africa, in countries like Gambia, Ghana, Nigeria.

=== United Kingdom ===
The first headquarter and studio was established in The London Mosque when it was launched, which then relocated to the Baitul Futuh Mosque complex with two large studios and currently stands as the primary headquarters of the MTA International Network, in South London. Following the relocation of the Ahmadiyya headquarters to Islamabad, Tilford, a studio was also established there in September 2021 and consequently became the third studio in the UK.

=== United States ===
The history of MTA International Studios USA goes back to October 1994 with the establishment of a base station and transmission centre located at the Baitur Rehman Mosque in Silver Spring, Maryland which broadcast programmes to various countries in the Americas. The earth station in USA is known as "MTA Teleport", which was renamed to "Masroor Teleport", following the inauguration of the renovation of the MTA USA Studios in October 2018. It is used to used to broadcast MTA3 Arabic and MTA8 America in the subcontinent.

== Photos ==
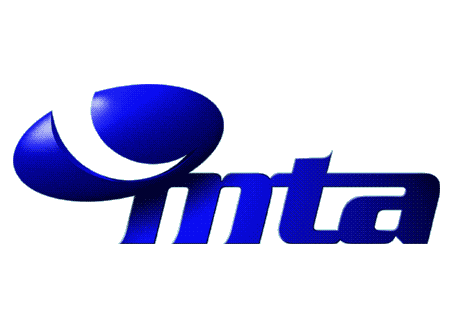
MTA International Second Logo

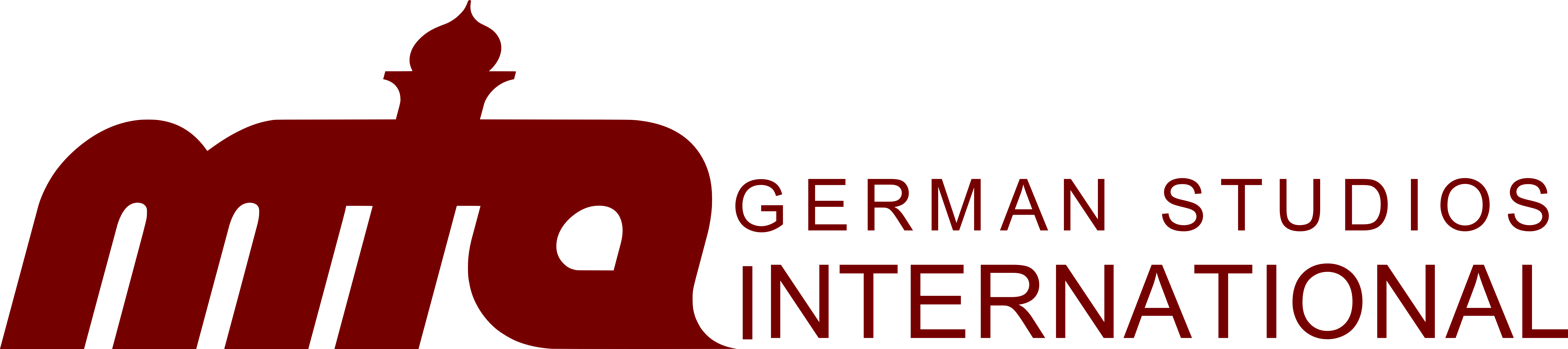
MTA International German Studios Logo

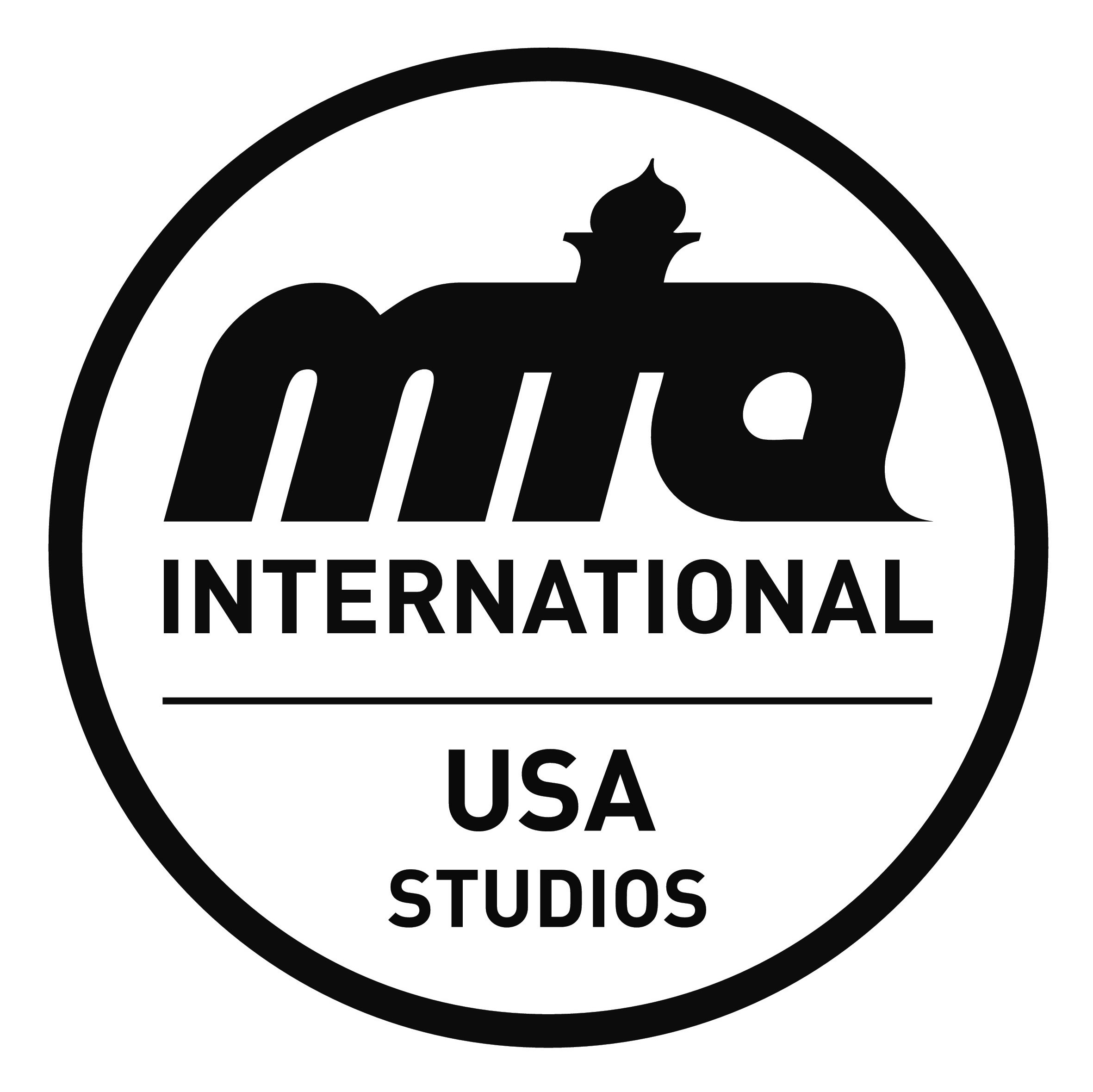
MTA International USA Studios

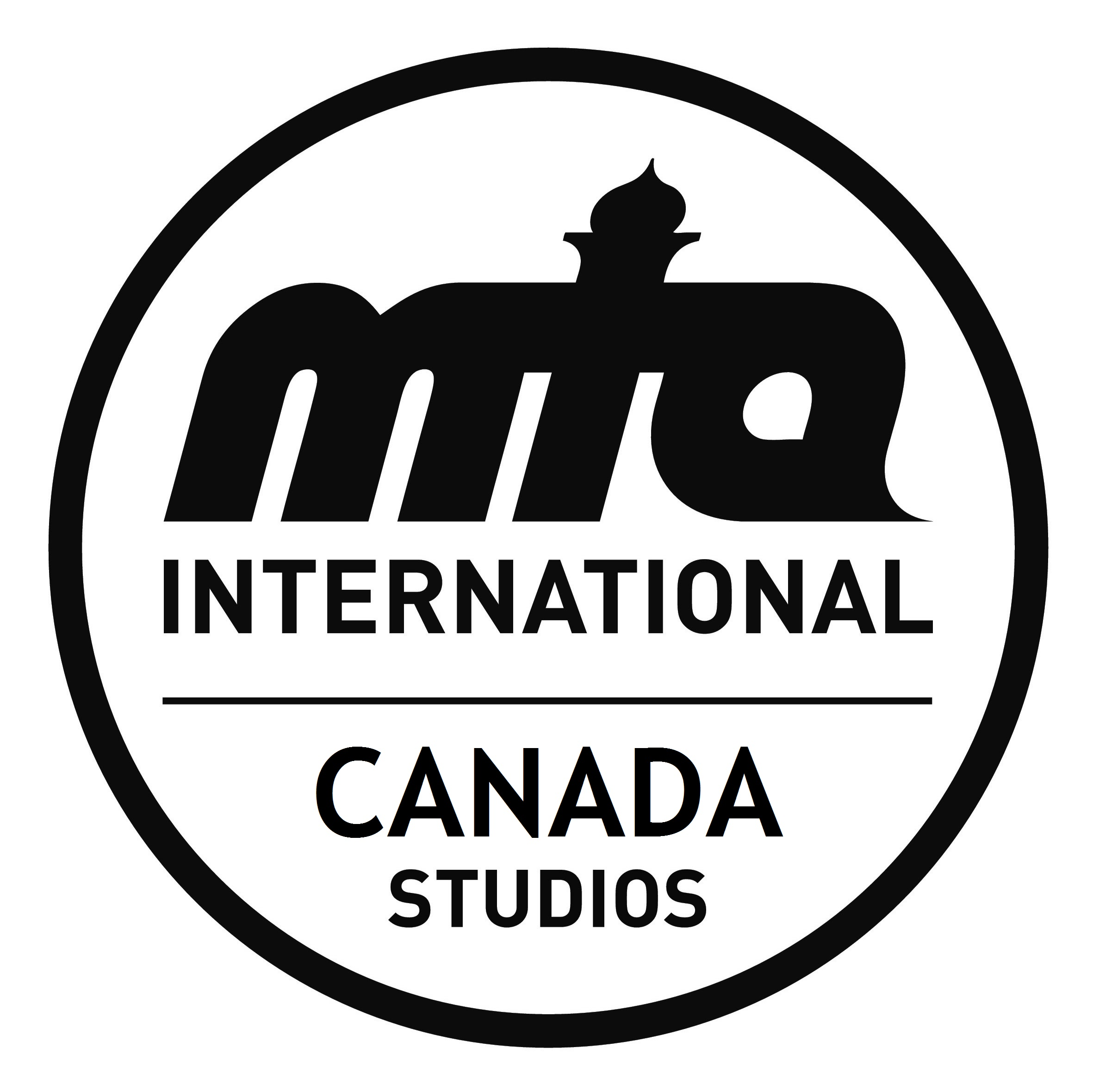
MTA International Canada Studios Logo

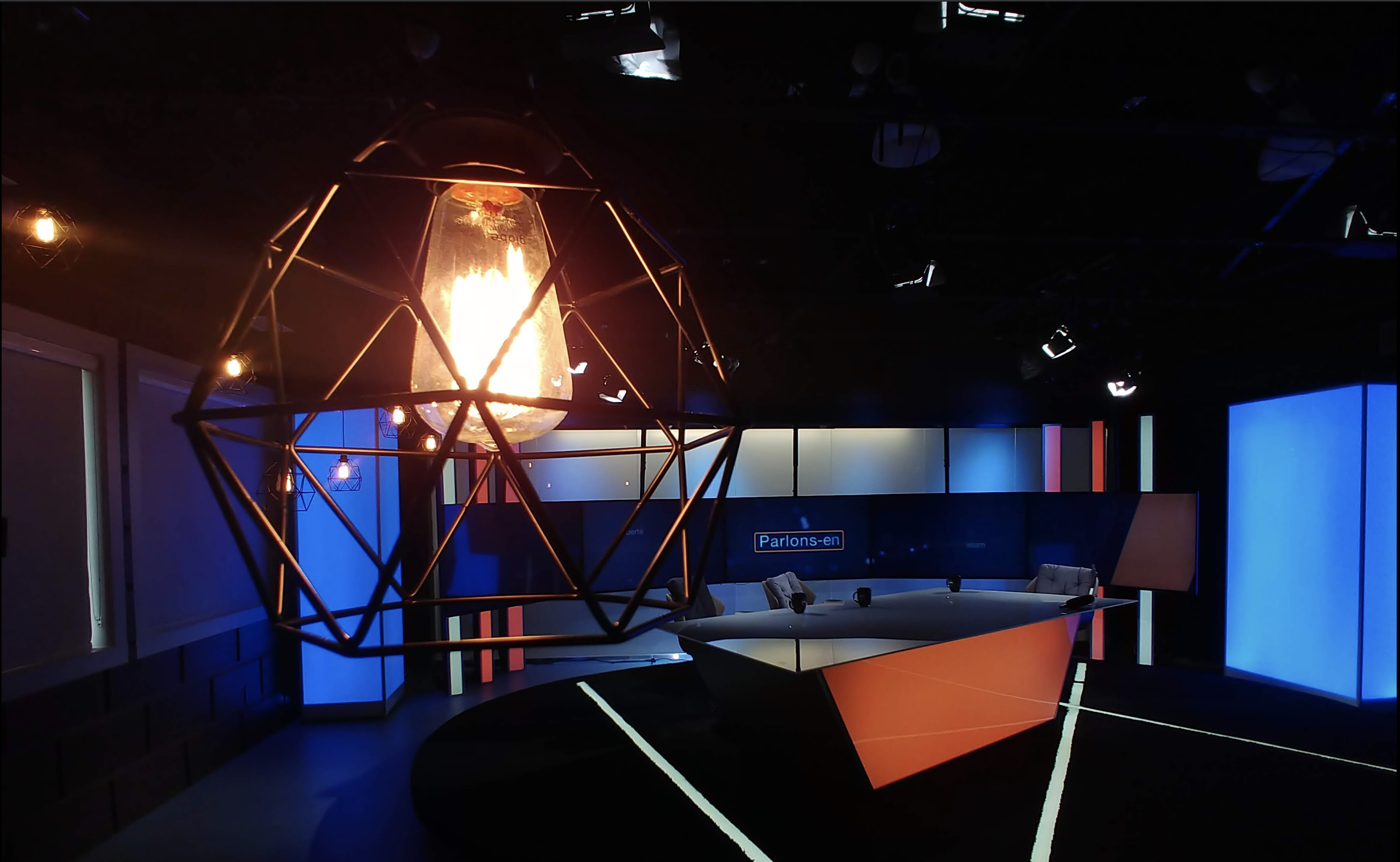
MTA International Canada Studios - Set Design

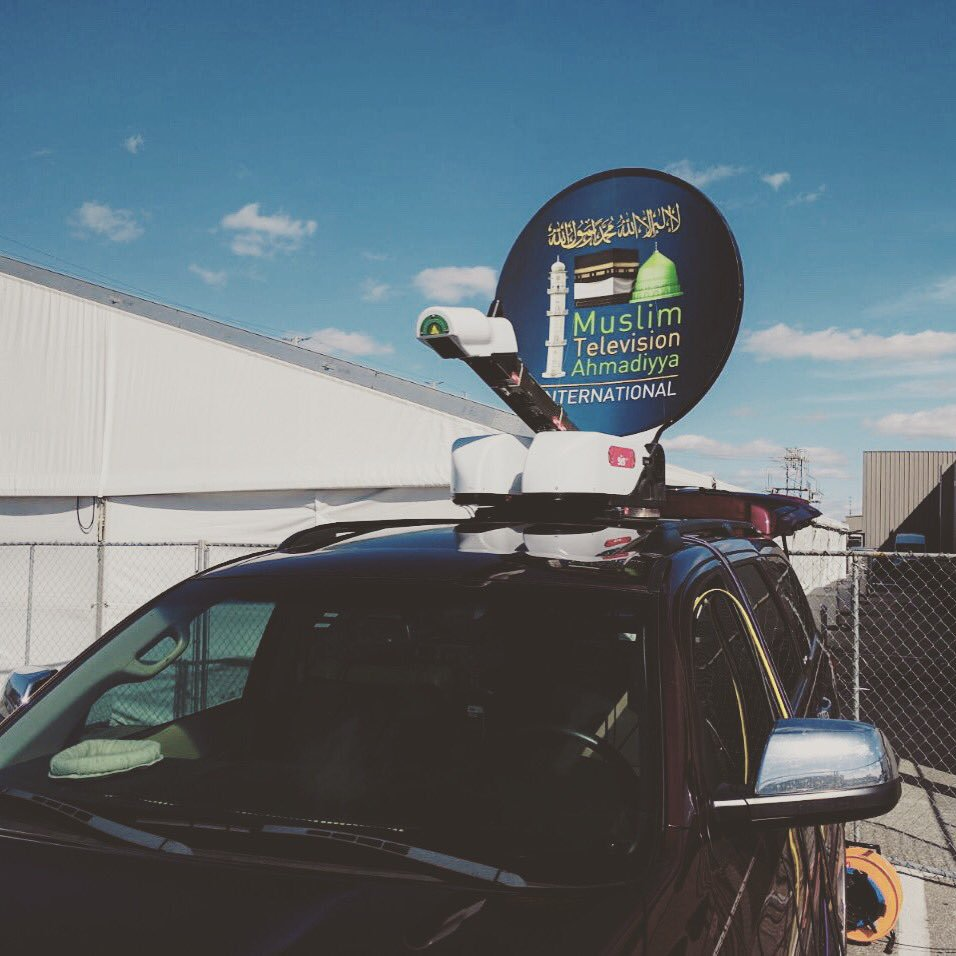
MTA International broadcast truck at Jalsa Salana Canada 2016
