= Ahmadiyya Caliphate =

Leadership of the Ahmadiyya Muslim Community

The Ahmadiyya Caliphate is a non-political caliphate established on May 27, 1908, following the death of Mirza Ghulam Ahmad, the founder of the Ahmadiyya Muslim Community, who claimed to be a Prophet, a Messenger, the promised Messiah and Mahdi, the expected redeemer awaited by Muslims. It is believed by Ahmadis to be the re-establishment of the Rashidun Caliphate that commenced following the death of the Islamic prophet Muhammad. The caliphs are entitled Khalīfatul Masīh (Arabic: خليفة المسيح; English: Caliph of the Messiah), sometimes simply referred to as Khalifa (or Caliph). The caliph is the elected spiritual and organizational leader of the worldwide Ahmadiyya Muslim Community and is the successor of Ghulam Ahmad. He is believed by the Community to be divinely ordained and is also referred to by its members as Amir al-Mu'minin (Leader of the Faithful) and Imam Jama'at (Imam of the Community). The 5th and current Caliph of the Messiah of the Ahmadiyya Community is Mirza Masroor Ahmad.

After the death of Ghulam Ahmad, his successors directed the Ahmadiyya Community from Qadian, India which remained the headquarters of the community until 1947 with the creation of Pakistan. From this time on the headquarters remained in Rabwah, a town built on land bought in Pakistan by the community in 1948. In 1984, Ordinance XX was promulgated by the government of Pakistan which prohibited Ahmadi Muslims from any public expression of the Islamic faith, rendering the caliph unable to perform his duties as the leader of the community. Due to these circumstances, the 4th caliph left Pakistan and migrated to London, England, provisionally moving the headquarters to the Fazl Mosque.

Since the Ahmadiyya is widely viewed as a heterodox movement by the mainstream of Sunni and Shia Islam, most Muslims outside the movement do not recognise Ahmadi claims to a caliphate.

== Overview ==
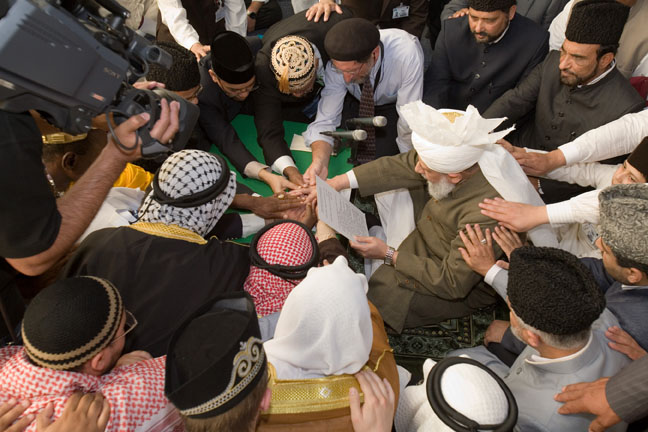
The 5th Caliph taking a pledge of allegiance from Ahmadis in 2008.

Ahmadi Muslims believe the system of caliphate (Arabic: Khilāfah) to be an ancillary to the system of prophethood, continuing to strive for the objectives for which a prophet is sent and to carry to completion the tasks of reformation and moral training that were seeded by the prophet. The caliphs, as successors to the prophets, lead the community of believers after a prophet's death.

Ahmadis maintain that in accordance with Quranic verses (such as Q24:55) and numerous hadith on the issue, the caliphate can only be established by God Himself and is a divine blessing given to those who believe and work righteousness, upholding the Unity of God. Therefore, any movement to establish the caliphate centered around human endeavours alone is bound to fail, particularly when the condition of the people diverges from the ‘precepts of Prophethood’ (minhājin nabūwwah) and they are as a result disunited. Although the caliph (Arabic: khalifa) in Ahmadiyya is elected, it is believed that God Himself directs the hearts and minds of believers through visions, dreams and spiritual guidance towards a particular individual. No campaigning, speeches or speculation of any kind are permitted. Thus the caliph is designated neither necessarily by right (i.e. the rightful or competent one in the eyes of the people at that time) nor merely by election but primarily by God.

According to Ahmadiyya thought, just as it is not essential for a prophet to be the head of a state, it is not essential for a caliph to be the head of a state, rather the religious and organisational significance of the caliphate is emphasised. It is above all a religious office, with the purpose to uphold, strengthen and spread Islam and maintain the high moral standards within the Muslim community established by Muhammad, who was not merely a political leader but primarily a religious leader. The caliphate is understood as a system dealing with the organisation of believers and relating to the administration (nizām) of the Muslim community whether or not it involves a governmental role. Being based on the 'precept of Prophethood', the institution of caliphate can therefore, like prophethood, exist and flourish without a state. If a caliph does happen to bear governmental authority as a head of state, it is incidental and subsidiary in relation to his overall function as caliph which is applicable to believers transnationally and not limited to one particular state or political entity. The system of caliphate in Islam, thus understood, transcends national sovereignty and ethnic divide, forming a universal supra-national entity and the role of a caliph as the leader of the Muslim community, in such an understanding, surpasses that of a monarch.

Because Muhammad became the head of state at Medina, the Rightly Guided successors after him also happened to be heads of state and – similar to the successors of Moses who led the Israelites after his death and, following the conquest of Canaan, gained control over a territory– functioned as political and military as well as religious leaders. Since Ghulam Ahmad, whom Ahmadis hold to be the promised Mahdi, was, like Jesus, not the head of a state, his successors after him – like the successors of Jesus did – function without attaching themselves to any state, seeking no political role and having no territorial ambition. In terms of the political aspect of the caliphate as envisioned within the Ahmadiyya community, since God's sovereignty is seen as extending over the universe, the ideal polity within Islam is one where the caliph is the spiritual head guiding, in accordance with Islamic principles, a federation or confederation of autonomous states (functioning under any political system or form of government) associated together for the maintenance of peace and cooperating in promoting human welfare throughout the world. Such a framework allows the caliph to relegate, if he sees fit, most or all his secular authority to the elected representatives of the members of such a confederation.

== Basis in Qur'an and Hadith ==
According to Ahmadiyya belief, God has promised in the Qur'an to appoint a successor among the righteous. In this respect, verse 56 (55 if the Basmallah isn't counted) of Surah Al-Nur says:

Allah had promised to those among you who believe and do good works that He will surely make them Successors in the earth, as He made Successors from among those who were before them; and that He will surely establish for them their religion which He has chosen for them; and that He will surely give them in exchange security and peace after their fear: They will worship Me, and they will not associate anything with Me. Then who so is ungrateful after that, they will be the rebellious.

A prophecy by Muhammad about the reestablishment of righteous Khilafat is narrated in Musnad Ahmad:

"Prophethood shall remain among you as long as Allah shall will. He will bring about its end and follow it with Khilafat on the precepts of prophethood for as long as He shall will and then bring about its end. A tyrannical monarchy will then follow and will remain as long as Allah shall will and then come to an end. There will follow thereafter monarchial despotism to last as long as Allah shall will and come to an end upon His decree. There will then emerge Khilafat on the precepts of Prophethood." The Holy Prophet said no more.

== The second Manifestation of God’s power ==
The succession of the caliph is believed by the Ahmadis to be the second manifestation of God's power that Ghulam Ahmad wrote about in his last testament Al-Wassiyyat (The Will).

... it is essential for you to witness the second Manifestation. Also, and its coming is better for you because it is everlasting, the continuity of which will not end till the day of Judgement. And that second Manifestation cannot come unless I depart but when I depart, God will send that second Manifestation for you... And after I am gone there will be some other persons who will be the manifestation of the second power (of God).

The Lahore Ahmadiyya Movement however does not subscribe to this belief and follow the concept of Anjuman (Council) that was described in the same book.

== List of Ahmadiyya Caliphs ==
Name	Picture	Lifespan	Office held	Notes
Khalifatul Masih I. Hakeem Noor-ud-Din		1834–1914	1908–1914	Close companion of Mirza Ghulam Ahmad, he sent the first Ahmadiyya Muslim missionaries to the UK, and successfully dealt with internal dissensions within the community.
Khalifatul Masih II. Mirza Basheer-ud-Din Mahmood Ahmad		1889–1965	1914–1965	Son of Mirza Ghulam Ahmad, was elected as Khalifa at the young age of 25, considered to be the 'promised son'. He established the entire organisational structure of the community, and is known for extensive missionary activity outside the subcontinent of India.
Khalifatul Masih III. Mirza Nasir Ahmad		1909–1982	1965–1982	Son of Mirza Basheer-ud-Din Mahmood Ahmad. Spoke himself for the Ahmadiyya community at the National Assembly of Pakistan. He oversaw the compilation of the writings, revelations and the dialogues of the founder, Ghulam Ahmad.
Khalifatul Masih IV. Mirza Tahir Ahmad		1928–2003	1982–2003	Son of Mirza Basheer-ud-Din Mahmood Ahmad and Paternal half-brother of Mirza Nasir Ahmad. Led the community through periods of severe persecution, provisionally changed the Ahmadiyya headquarters from Rabwah to London and launched the first Muslim satellite television channel, Muslim Television Ahmadiyya International.
Khalifatul Masih V. Mirza Masroor Ahmad		1950–present	2003–present	He is the great-grandson of Mirza Ghulam Ahmad. Built the Mubarak Mosque in Tilford which is the current Ahmadiyya headquarter. Launched sister channels MTA 2 and MTA 3.

Timeline

== See also ==
- Khalifatul Rasul Allah
- International Baiat
