= Mirza Masroor Ahmad =

Spiritual leader of the Ahmadiyya Muslim Community

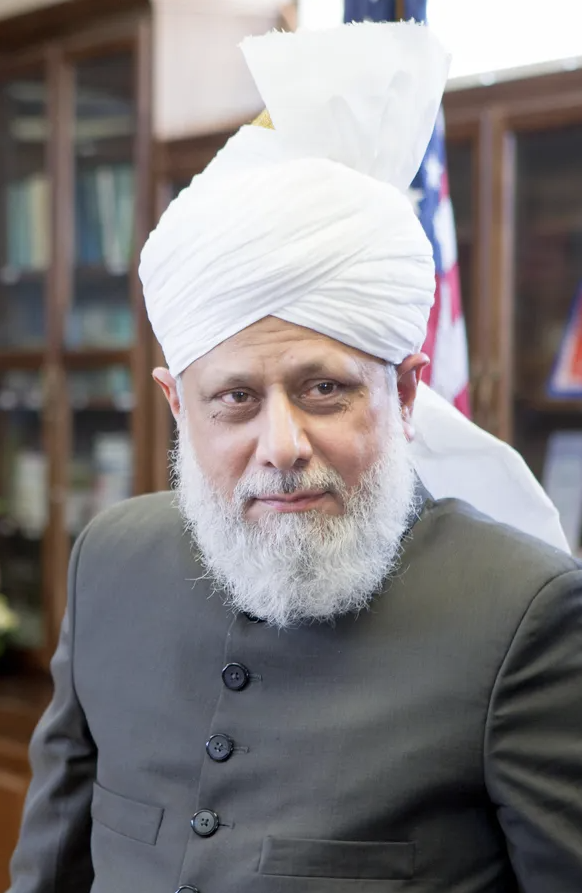
- Masroor Ahmad in 2022
- Title: Amir al-Mu'minin

Personal life
- Born: 15 September 1950 (age 76) Rabwah, Punjab, Dominion of Pakistan (present day Pakistan)
- Spouse: Sahibzadi Amatul Sabooh Begum (m. 1977)
- Children: Mirza Waqas Ahmad; Amtul Waris Fateh
- Parents: Mirza Mansoor Ahmad (father); Sahibzadi Nasira Begum (mother)
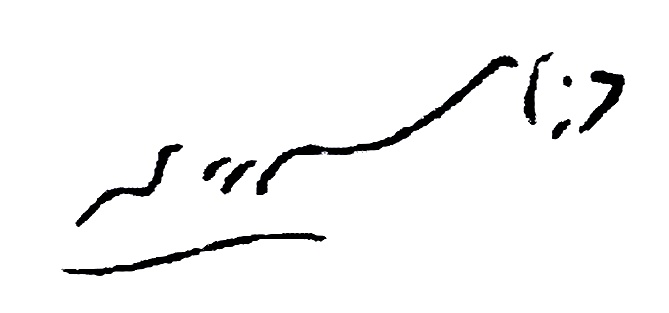
- Signature

Religious life
- Religion: Islam
- Denomination: Ahmadiyya
- Consecration: 22 April 2003

Muslim leader
- Post: Caliph
- Predecessor: Mirza Tahir Ahmad

Mirza Masroor Ahmad (مرزا مسرور احمد; born 15 September 1950) is the current and fifth leader of the Ahmadiyya Muslim Community. His official title within the movement is Fifth Caliph of the Messiah (Arabic: خليفة المسيح الخامس, khalīfatul masīh al-khāmis). He was elected on 22 April 2003, three days after the death of his predecessor Mirza Tahir Ahmad.

Following the death of the fourth caliph, the Electoral College, for the first time in the history of the community, convened outside the Indian subcontinent and in the city of London, after which Mirza Masroor Ahmad was elected as the fifth caliph of the Ahmadiyya Muslim Community. At the very commencement of his accession, he found himself forced into exile from Pakistan in response to pressure from the Government of Pakistan. Since being elected, he has travelled extensively across the world to meet the members of the community and address their annual gatherings. In many of the countries he has visited it has been the first visit by an Ahmadiyya caliph.

== Early life ==
Mirza Masroor Ahmad was born on 15 September 1950 in Rabwah, Pakistan, the global headquarters of the Ahmadiyya Muslim Community at the time. He is a nephew of Mirza Tahir Ahmad, the fourth caliph, his mother being a sister of the fourth caliph.

=== Ghana ===
Having served the Community in various capacities, Masroor Ahmad served in Ghana for over eight years. He established the Ahmadiyya Secondary School in Salaga, a school in the northern region of Ghana, where he served as principal for two years. His success with the school in Salaga made him an obvious choice as principal of the Ahmadiyya Secondary School in Essarkyir, located in the central region of Ghana. There he served as principal for four years.

After his tenure as principal, Masroor Ahmad was appointed as the manager of the Ahmadiyya Agricultural Farm in Depali located in the northern region of Ghana where he served for two years. He successfully planted and nurtured wheat for the first time in Ghana. The experiment of planting, growing and nurturing wheat as an economic crop in Ghana was exhibited at an international trade fair and the results were submitted to the Ministry of Agriculture of Ghana.

=== Imprisonment in 1999 ===
In 1999, a resolution was presented in the Provincial Assembly of the Punjab which demanded that the name of Rabwah be changed because that name appeared in the Qur'an. The resolution passed without much debate and the name of Rabwah was officially changed to Chenab Nagar. Signage was placed in prominent parts of Rabwah which bore the new name. A few days later, a First Information Report (criminal complaint) was filed accusing certain members of the community of erasing a sign which bore the new name. Though the complaint didn't mention any names, a case was registered, resulting in the arrest of Masroor Ahmad and a few other senior members of the Ahmadiyya Community. They were imprisoned for 11 days without bail, but were released without charge on 10 May 1999.

== Leadership ==
Masroor Ahmad was elected as the fifth caliph on 22 April 2003, a few days after the demise of his predecessor Mirza Tahir Ahmad. Today he frequently tours around the world, visiting countries for the community's Jalsa Salanas (annual gatherings). Masroor Ahmad also regularly leads prayers at the Al-Fazl Mosque in London, England as well as Friday prayers from Baitul Futuh Mosque, in Morden, London.

Under his leadership the community's global satellite TV network MTA International, launched by his predecessor, has expanded into several further affiliated TV channels, social media and radio stations to provide transmission in different languages. Further campuses of Jamia Ahmadiyya, the Ahmadiyya Islamic seminary and educational institution, have been established including one in Ghana and one in the United Kingdom, the latter has been the first in Europe. He has focused particularly on directing the community in systematically countering negative media coverage of Islam and engaging in grassroots efforts to propagate what the community believes is the true message of Islam.

In 2004, he launched – and regularly addresses – the annual National Peace Symposium (held twice in 2015) in which guests from all walks of life come together at the largest mosque in Western Europe (the Baitul Futuh Mosque) to exchange ideas on establishing world peace. These symposia have attracted parliamentarians, religious leaders and other dignitaries. In 2009, he initiated the Ahmadiyya Muslim Peace Prize; an international peace award for individuals or organisations that have demonstrated an extraordinary commitment and service to the cause of peace and humanitarianism.

Masroor Ahmad has frequently met heads of state in different parts of the world as well as having delivered keynote addresses to the United States Congress on Capitol Hill, the European Parliament, the United Kingdom Houses of Parliament, the Parliament of Canada and the Dutch Parliament on the teachings of Islam regarding the establishment of peace, presenting Quranic solutions to world problems. He has consistently called for honesty and the observance of unconditional justice and fairness in international relations.

=== Khilafat Centenary ===
On 27 May 2008, members of the community celebrated the hundredth anniversary of the establishment of Khilafat. Masroor Ahmad spoke at a large gathering of community members in the Excel Center in London, England and took a pledge from Ahmadis worldwide. This was relayed around the world via the community's television channel, Muslim Television Ahmadiyya International with a live link up to Qadian, India, the birthplace of Mirza Ghulam Ahmad and original global headquarters before the partition of India in 1947.

A Jalsa Salana celebrating the centenary anniversary of the Caliphate was planned in Qadian for December 2008. This gathering was to mark the end of celebrations of the centenary. However, due to the Mumbai terrorist attacks in late November, and the resulting security situation, Masroor Ahmad cancelled his participation in the gathering at Qadian and returned to London.

== Political and religious positions ==
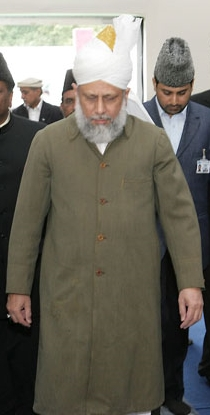
Khalifatul Masih V at the International Bay'ah Ceremony 2007 wearing the green coat of Mirza Ghulam Ahmad.

=== Jyllands-Posten Muhammad cartoons controversy ===
In 2005, a Danish newspaper, Jyllands-Posten published some caricatures of the Islamic prophet Muhammad that infuriated Muslims around the world. Ahmad condemned the publishers of the cartoons saying that this was an abuse of free speech. But at the same time, he condemned the violent reaction showed by some Muslims around the world saying that this goes against the fabric of peaceful teachings of Islam. He guided his community to disseminate the character of Muhammad in Denmark as well as the rest of the world through writings and dialogue. He also advised Ahmadis to send durood on Muhammad in this time of adversity. His sermons on this issue were later published as a book, The Blessed Model of the Holy Prophet Muhammad and the Caricatures.

=== Pope Benedict XVI Islam controversy ===
On 12 September 2006, while giving a lecture at the University of Regensburg, Pope Benedict XVI quoted the opinion of Byzantine Emperor Manuel II Palaiologos, "Show me just what Muhammad brought that was new and there you will find things only evil and inhuman, such as his command to spread by the sword the faith he preached". The quotation drew criticism from a number of individual governmental representatives and Muslim religious leaders including Mirza Masroor Ahmad, Khalifatul Masih V.

As the leader of the Ahmadiyya Muslim Community, Masroor Ahmad disapproved of the Pope's view on Islam, stating that the Pope had been irresponsible and lacked knowledge of Islam. He explicated the 'inherent peaceful teachings of Islam' and the Qur'an and sought to remove misconceptions regarding Jihad and Muhammad, in light of references made by European writers in his Friday Sermon on 15 September 2006.

=== 2010 Quran-burning controversy ===
The plan to burn the Qur'an by the Dove World Outreach Center on the 9th anniversary of 9/11 attacks was highly condemned by Masroor Ahmad at the Baitul Futuh mosque in London, England. He stated that "religious extremism, be it Christian extremism, Muslim extremism or any other kind, is never a true reflection of the religion".

=== 2010 Ground Zero mosque controversy ===
In 2010, plans were being made to build a 13-story Muslim community center located two blocks from the World Trade Center site in Lower Manhattan, New York City. Although the Park51 building would not be visible from the World Trade Center site, opponents of the project have said that establishing a mosque so close to Ground Zero would be offensive since the hijackers in the 11 September 2001 attacks were Islamic terrorists.

Masroor Ahmad commented on the plan to build a mosque near Ground Zero where he stated:

If a mosque is built at the proposed site, then the Ahmadiyya Muslim Community would like to see churches, synagogues, Hindu places of worship and places of worship of all other religions also built near Ground Zero. That would be a good example of how from an act of evil and terror has emerged unity and peace.

— Mirza Masroor Ahmad

=== Geert Wilders controversy ===
Geert Wilders is a Dutch politician. Wilders is best known for his criticism of Islam, summing up his views by saying, "I don't hate Muslims, I hate Islam". Masroor Ahmad has, in his sermons, repeatedly refuted the allegations raised by Wilders against Islam. Addressing Wilders directly, he said:

Listen carefully – You, your party and every other person like you will ultimately be destroyed. But the religion of Islam and the message of the Holy Prophet Muhammad (peace be upon him) will remain forever. No worldly power, no matter how powerful and no matter how much hatred they bear towards Islam, will ever succeed in erasing our religion.

— Mirza Masroor Ahmad

In reply to the statement, Wilders asked Piet Hein Donner, Interior Minister of the Netherlands whether the government considered this a threat and whether they would take any action against Ahmad. Donner replied that he saw no threat as Ahmad threatened the destruction of Wilders through peaceful prayer only and not violence, and that the Ahmadiyya Muslim Community worldwide are known to be peaceful.

=== Condemnation of Grand Mufti of Saudi Arabia's anti-church edict ===
On 8 April 2012, Mirza Masroor Ahmad condemned the fatwa (edict) of Abdul Aziz al-Shaikh, Grand Mufti of Saudi Arabia calling for the destruction of all churches in Saudi Arabia and surrounding Arab states.

I was shocked and very saddened to learn that Saudi Arabia’s Grand Mufti has called for all Churches in the region to be destroyed. What he has said is completely against the teachings of Islam and must be condemned absolutely. We find that the Holy Prophet (peace be upon him) spent his entire life preaching peace, tolerance and justice. Thus there can be no other conclusion than to say that what the Grand Mufti has said is completely wrong and displays a complete lack of understanding of Islam on his part.

— Mirza Masroor Ahmad

=== Innocence of Muslims ===
In his Friday Sermons of 21 and 28 September 2012, Masroor Ahmad strongly condemned the anti-Islamic film Innocence of Muslims. He said that Muslim emotions against the film were justified to an extent; however he also condemned the reaction to the film by some Muslims with riots resulting in at least 75 deaths worldwide. The Friday Sermons were attended by many media outlets including the BBC and a news station from New Zealand. He said Muslims should react by invoking durood (praise) upon Muhammad. He also indicated that the creators and benefactors of the film would all suffer a great torment by God.

=== Charlie Hebdo attack ===
On 7 January 2015, gunmen forced their way into the offices of the satirical French newspaper Charlie Hebdo in Paris. They shot and killed 12 people during the attack. The attack was linked to cartoons mocking Muhammad that Charlie Hebdo had published in recent years. Masroor Ahmad categorically condemned the terrorist attacks. He said that the attacks had nothing to do with the true teachings of Islam and that the perpetrators and anyone found to be involved should be punished in accordance with the law. He further added that such cartoons grieved and pained peace-loving Muslims throughout the world and were to be condemned, but any form of violent or illegal response could never be justified and was completely against the teachings of Islam. He also stated that taking to the streets in protest was not an appropriate response but rather Muslims should respond by increasing in prayer and offering salutations to Muhammad.

=== Lahore massacre ===
On 28 May 2010, two Ahmadi mosques in Lahore, Pakistan, came under attack from the Tehrik-i-Taliban Pakistan Punjab wing. The attacks were carried out nearly simultaneously at Darul Al Zikr Mosque in Garhi Shahu and Bait Al Noor Mosque in Model Town. Ninety-four people were killed in the incident (including one attacker) with 108 injured. Another attacker was captured by the worshippers.

Masroor Ahmad issued two press releases urging members of the community to exercise patience and prayers and that in response, "no inappropriate action would be shown by any Ahmadi".

== Reception ==
Masroor Ahmad is the supreme religious leader of the Ahmadi community, a group which some Muslims believe should not be considered Muslim. When Ahmad inaugurated the Baitul Futuh Mosque in London in 2003, the Muslim Association of Britain said it respected Ahmad's freedom of religion, but the building should be called "prayer space" and not be considered a "mosque".

In 2016, Ahmad travelled to Canada, where he was welcomed by Minister of Immigration, Refugees and Citizenship, John McCallum. Ahmad had previously been joined by Canadian Prime Minister Stephen Harper in 2008 inaugurating an Ahamadiyya mosque in Calgary. Canadian Minister Jason Kenney welcomed and met with Ahmad in 2013, and praised his community for "its commitment to peace, tolerance and equality for all".

== Lectures, sermons and articles ==
- True Love for the Holy Prophet
- The Blessed Model of the Holy Prophet Muhammad and the Caricatures
- World Crisis and the Pathway to Peace
- Conditions of Bai'at and Responsibilities of an Ahmadi
- A Response to the Pope's Remarks about Islam
- Islam – A Peaceful Religion
- Exemplary Compassion of Prophet Muhammad
- Speeches and Articles in the Review of Religions
- Social Media
- The Great Western Revival
