= Mirza Tahir Ahmad =

Ahmadiyya spiritual leader (1928–2003)

- مرزا طاہر احمد
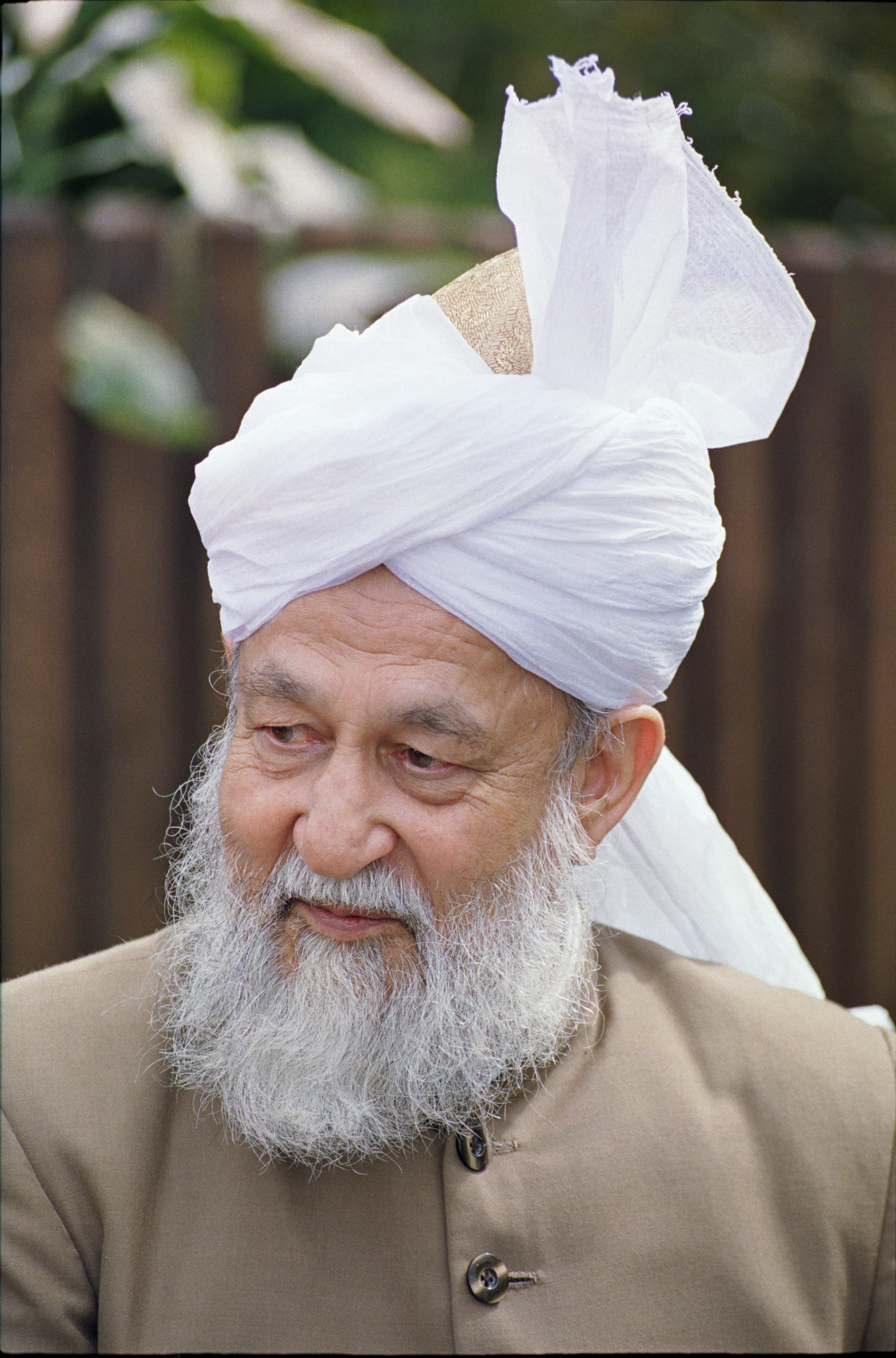
- Mirza Tahir Ahmad in 2000
- Title: Caliph of the Messiah; Amir al-Mu'minin

Personal life
- Born: 18 December 1928 Qadian, Punjab, British India
- Died: 19 April 2003 (aged 74) London, England
- Resting place: Mubarak Mosque, Tilford, England
- Spouse: Asifa Begum (m. 1957–1992)
- Children: Four
- Parents: Mirza Basheer-ud-Din Mahmood Ahmad (father); Maryam Begum (mother)

Religious life
- Religion: Ahmadiyya Islam
- Consecration: 10 June 1982

Senior posting
- Post: Caliph
- Predecessor: Mirza Nasir Ahmad
- Successor: Mirza Masroor Ahmad

Mirza Tahir Ahmad (مرزا طاہر احمد; 18 December 1928 – 19 April 2003) was the fourth caliph (Arabic: خليفة المسيح الرابع, khalīfatul masīh al-rābi) and the head of the worldwide Ahmadiyya Muslim Community. He was elected as the fourth successor of the founder of the community, Mirza Ghulam Ahmad. He was elected on 10 June 1982, the day after the death of his predecessor, Mirza Nasir Ahmad.

Following the Ordinance XX that was promulgated by the government of Pakistan in 1984, which prohibited Ahmadi Muslims from any public expression of the Islamic faith, Tahir Ahmad left Pakistan and migrated to London, England, provisionally moving the headquarters of the community to the Fazl Mosque in London. He is noted particularly for his question and answer sessions which he held regularly with people from around the world and for his Quranic discourses. Under his leadership, there was an acceleration in the number of Quran translations produced by the Community; and during his caliphate, the Community experienced structural and financial growth on an international level, including the launch of the first Muslim satellite television network, Muslim Television Ahmadiyya in 1994 through which he could communicate televised messages to the Community globally and have his sermons and other public engagements transmitted throughout the world through this medium.

Tahir Ahmad also authored many books including, Some Distinctive Features of Islam; Christianity: A Journey from Facts to Fiction; Murder in the Name of Allah, and his magnum opus Revelation, Rationality, Knowledge & Truth.

== Leadership of Ahmadiyya ==
The Majlis Intikhab Khilafat (Electoral College), convened at Mubarik Mosque in Rabwah, Pakistan, elected Mirza Tahir Ahmad as the fourth successor to Mirza Ghulam Ahmad and head of the community on 10 June 1982.

=== Muslim Television Ahmadiyya ===
As Khalifatul Masih, Mirza Tahir Ahmad established the Muslim Television Ahmadiyya (commonly referred to as MTA). This satellite-based channel broadcast its first program (the Friday Sermon by Tahir Ahmad) on 7 January 1994 from London.

=== International Bai'at ===
In 1993 Mirza Tahir Ahmad started an international initiation ceremony to be held every year at the annual gatherings of Ahmadis in which new converts join the community by pledging their allegiance to the Khalifa. The International Bai'at ceremony was broadcast live across the world. He often claimed that it was the historical fulfillment of the Pentecost that was destined to occur at the time of the Second Coming.

== Death ==
Mirza Tahir Ahmad died in London on 19 April 2003 from heart failure. The newly elected Caliph Mirza Masroor Ahmad, as the Khalifatul Masih V, led the funeral prayer on 23 April 2003, attended by over 40,000 people from around the world. His successor is his nephew, the son of one of his sisters.

== Writings, speeches and Q&A sessions ==
=== Revelation, Rationality, Knowledge and Truth ===
Ahmad wrote a book title Revelation, Rationality, Knowledge and Truth, which was a further development on a talk he gave in Zurich, Switzerland, in 1987. It covered many topics relating to the present-day. In this book he argued a rebuttal to the theories of biologist Richard Dawkins. He argues that Socrates was a prophet of the ancient Greeks and that several other prominent figures from history were at the level of prophethood.

=== Quranic exegesis ===
Tahir Ahmad delivered annual commentaries on the Quran during the month of Ramadan. He incorporated lengthy discussions of previous commentators as well as the founder of Ahmadiyya and the Ahmadiyya Caliphs that came before him. In addition, he discussed the lexicon of the Quran and refuted many Orientalist ideas about the historicity of the Quran, Islam and the life of the Prophet Muhammad. His commentaries differed significantly from those offered by many of the classical Quranic commentators, placing emphasis on the importance of a logical and rational approach to the Quran. For example, he did not believe it was essential to rely heavily on Asbab al-nuzul (Circumstances of the Revelation) in order to understand the implications of the Quranic verses, instead, presenting strong arguments for the Quran offering its own context. He delivered seven discourses on the Asbab al-nuzul.

=== Selected books ===
- Revelation, Rationality, Knowledge & Truth – Examines the relationship between science, philosophy and religion
- Sawaney Fazl – E – Omer – Official Biography of Mirza Basheer-ud-Din Mahmood Ahmad, the second Caliph of the Ahmadiyya Muslim Community
- An Elementary Study of Islam
- Gulf Crisis and The New World Order
- Christianity – A Journey from Facts to Fiction – Examines and discusses a variety of current Christian beliefs through logic and reason
- Murder in the Name of Allah
- Zahaqal Baatil
- Reality of punishment of apostasy in Islam (Urdu)
- Homeopathy
- Some Distinctive Features of Islam
- Introduction to the Surahs of The Noble Quran: With Brief Explanatory Notes to Some Verses

== See also ==
- Khalifatul Masih
