= Article 260(3) of the Constitution of Pakistan =

Constitutional clause defining Muslim and non-Muslim in Pakistan

Article 260(3) of the Constitution of Pakistan is an interpretive clause that defines the terms Muslim and non-Muslim for the purposes of the Constitution, enactments, and other legal instruments in Pakistan. The clause was first inserted into Article 260 by the Second Amendment in 1974, after parliamentary proceedings on the status of the Ahmadi community. In 1985, the clause was replaced by the Constitution (Third Amendment) Order, 1985, which introduced separate definitions of Muslim and non-Muslim and explicitly included persons of the Qadiani and Lahori groups among those deemed non-Muslim for legal purposes.

== Text ==
The present wording of Article 260(3), as substituted in 1985, reads:

In the Constitution and all enactments and other legal instruments, unless there is anything repugnant in the subject or context,—

(a) "Muslim" means a person who believes in the unity and oneness of Almighty Allah, in the absolute and unqualified finality of the Prophethood of Muhammad (PBUH), the last of the Prophets, and does not believe in, or recognize as a prophet or religious reformer, any person who claimed or claims to be a prophet, in any sense of the word or of any description whatsoever, after MUHAMMAD (PBUH); and

(b) "non-Muslim" means a person who is not a Muslim and include a person belonging to the Christian, Hindu, Sikh, Buddhist or Parsi community, a person of the Qadiani group or the Lahori group (who call themselves "Ahmadis" or by any other name), or a Bahai, and a person belonging to any of the Scheduled Casts.

== Background ==
Controversy over the constitutional status of Ahmadis in Pakistan predated the 1973 Constitution. The anti-Ahmadi movement of 1953 failed to achieve its immediate aim of having Ahmadis declared non-Muslim, but that the political climate changed in 1974 after the Rabwah incident and the protests that followed it. Prime Minister Zulfikar Ali Bhutto referred the matter to Parliament rather than to the superior judiciary or the Council of Islamic Ideology, and the resulting proceedings led to a constitutional amendment declaring Ahmadis non-Muslim for legal purposes.

== Legislative history ==
On September 7, 1974, the National Assembly and the Senate passed the Constitution (Second Amendment) Bill. Dawn reported that the bill passed the National Assembly by 130 votes and the Senate by 31 votes, with all members present voting in favour. Presidential assent was received on September 17, 1974.

As first enacted in 1974, Article 260(3) stated only that a person who did not believe in the "absolute and unqualified finality" of the prophethood of Muhammad, or who recognized a later claimant, was not a Muslim for the purposes of the Constitution or law.

On March 19, 1985, during the rule of President Muhammad Zia-ul-Haq, the Constitution (Third Amendment) Order, 1985 replaced the 1974 text with the present version. The new wording extended the clause to "all enactments and other legal instruments" and added an explicit definition of non-Muslim naming the Qadiani and Lahori groups, Baháʼís, and members of the Scheduled Castes.

Date	Measure	Effect on Article 260(3)
September 7, 1974	Constitution (Second Amendment) Bill passed by the National Assembly and Senate	Parliament approved the first insertion of clause (3), defining persons who rejected the finality of Muhammad's prophethood as not Muslim for the purposes of the Constitution or law.
September 17, 1974	Presidential assent to the Constitution (Second Amendment) Act, 1974	Clause (3) came into force.
March 19, 1985	Constitution (Third Amendment) Order, 1985	Replaced the 1974 text with the current wording, including separate definitions of Muslim and non-Muslim.

== See also ==
- Second Amendment to the Constitution of Pakistan
- Ordinance XX
- Ahmadiyya in Pakistan
- Religious discrimination in Pakistan
