= List of Gregorian Islamic observances =

- February 1: World Hijab Day
- Second Sunday in February: International Purple Hijab Day
- February 20: Promised Reformer Day (Ahmadiyya)
- February 28: Teachers' Day (Arab states)
- March 15: International Day To Combat Islamophobia
- March 23: Promised Messiah Day (Ahmadiyya)
- May 27: Caliphate Day (Ahmadiyya)
- July 11: Imamat Day (Nizari Ismaili Shiʿi Muslims)

== See also ==
- List of observances set by the Islamic calendar
