= Holiday =

Festive day set aside by custom or by law

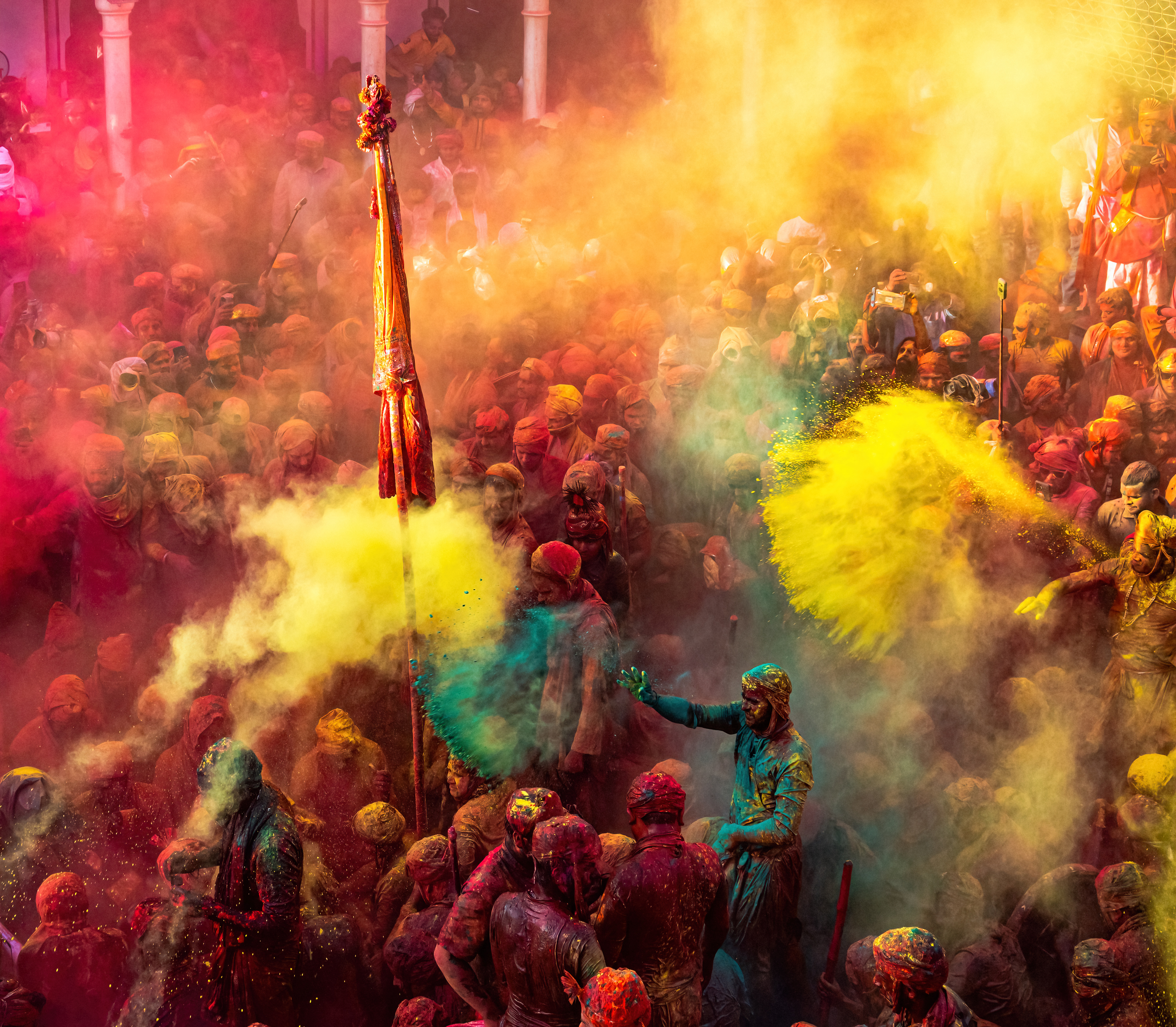
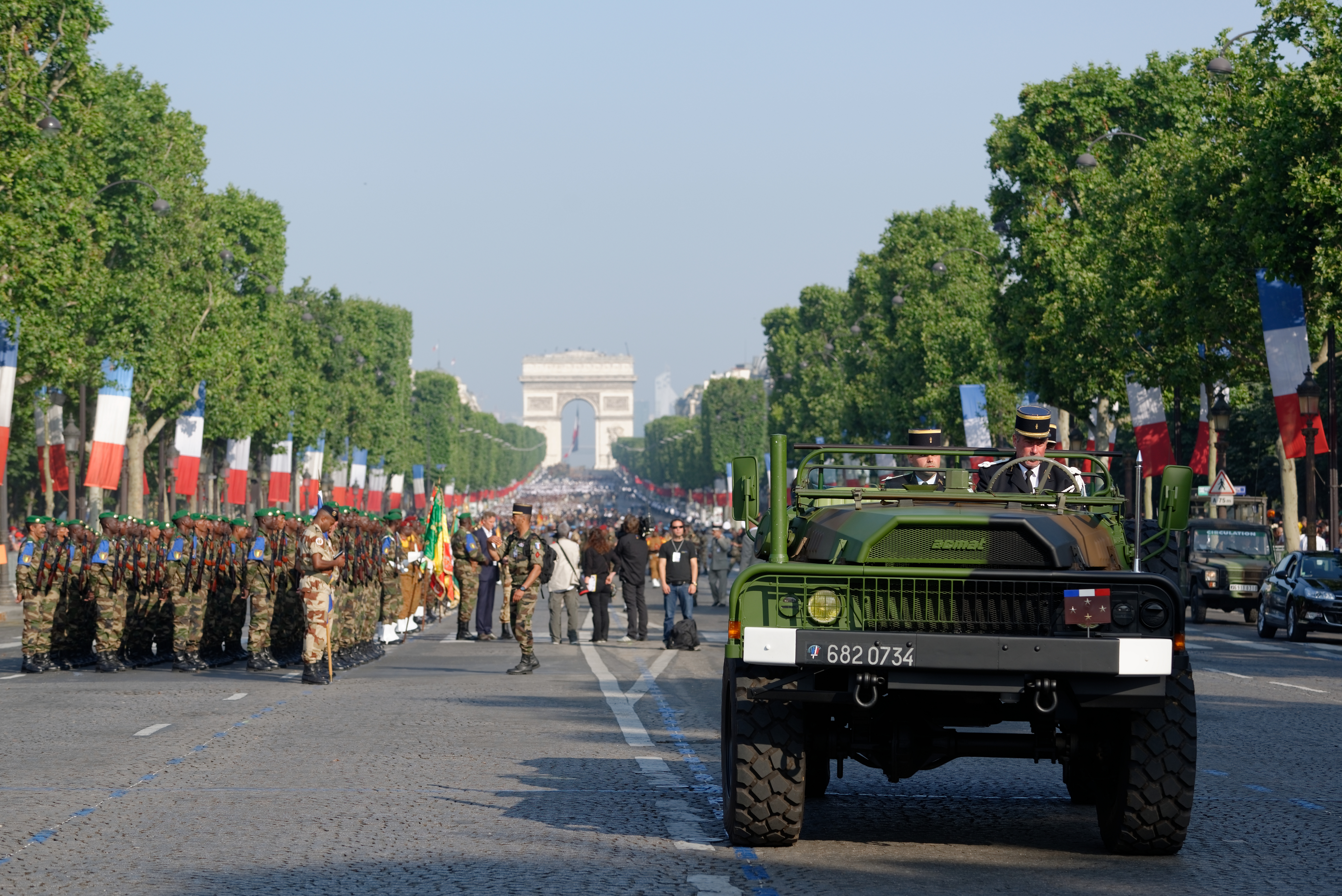
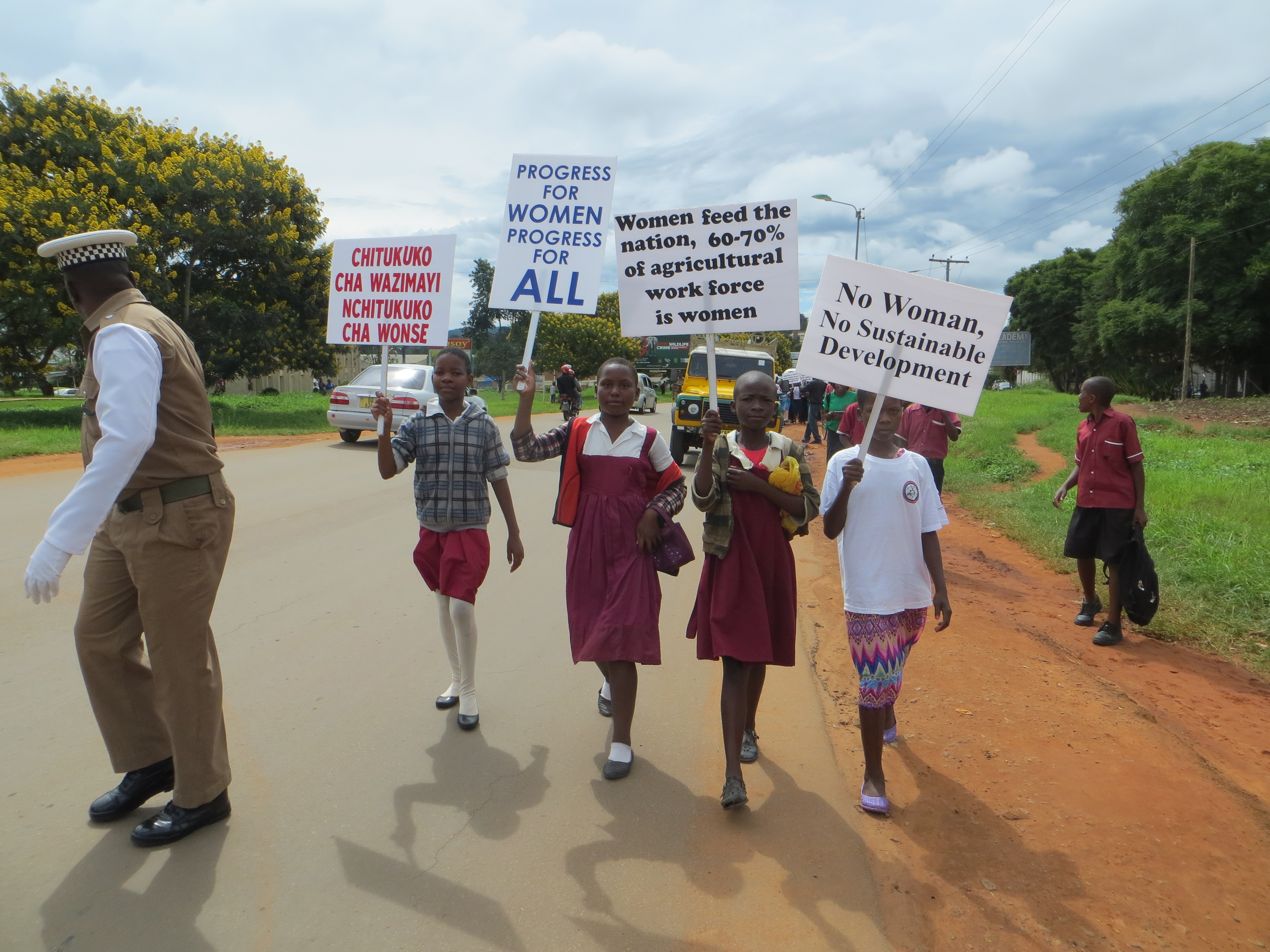
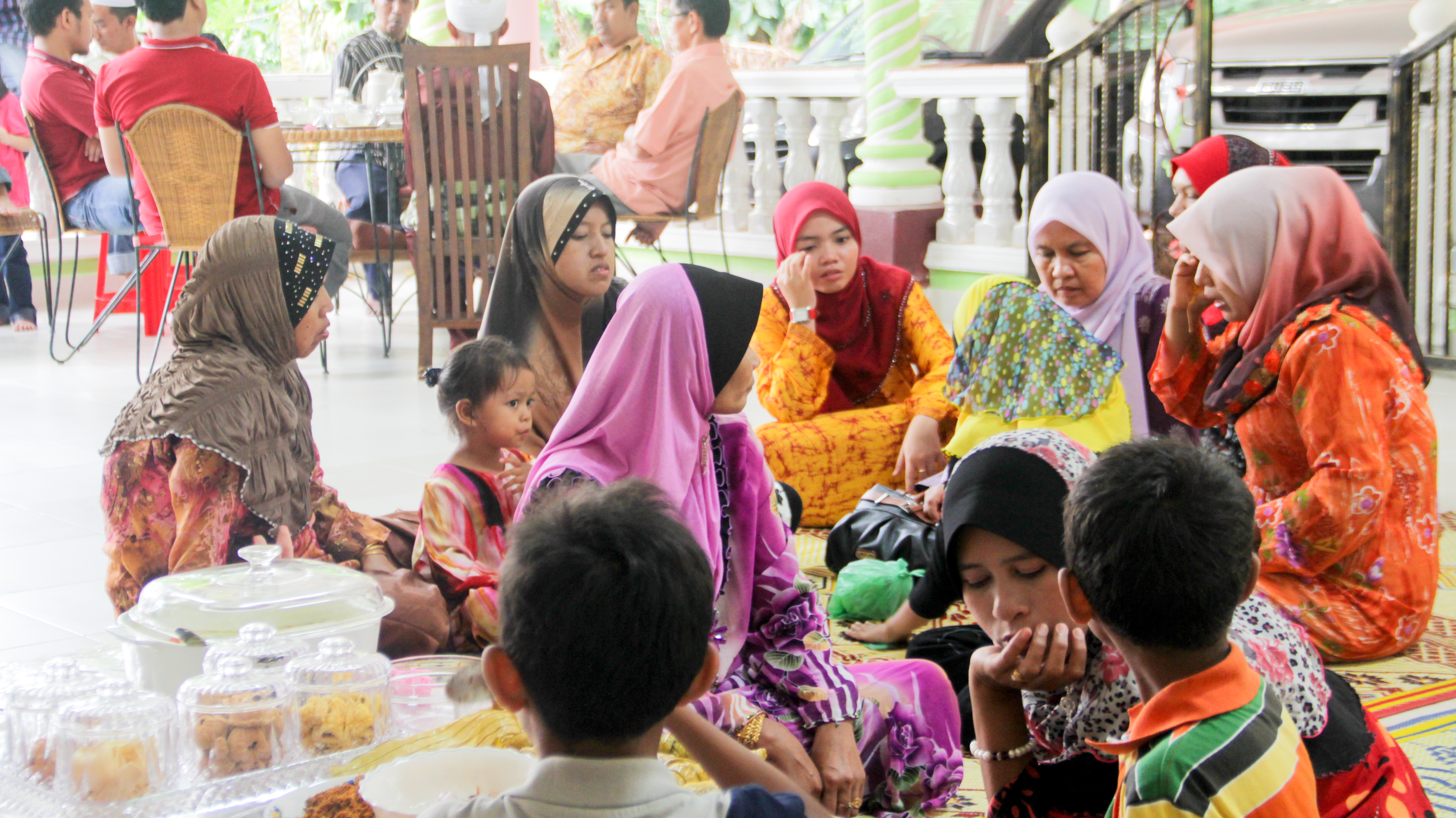
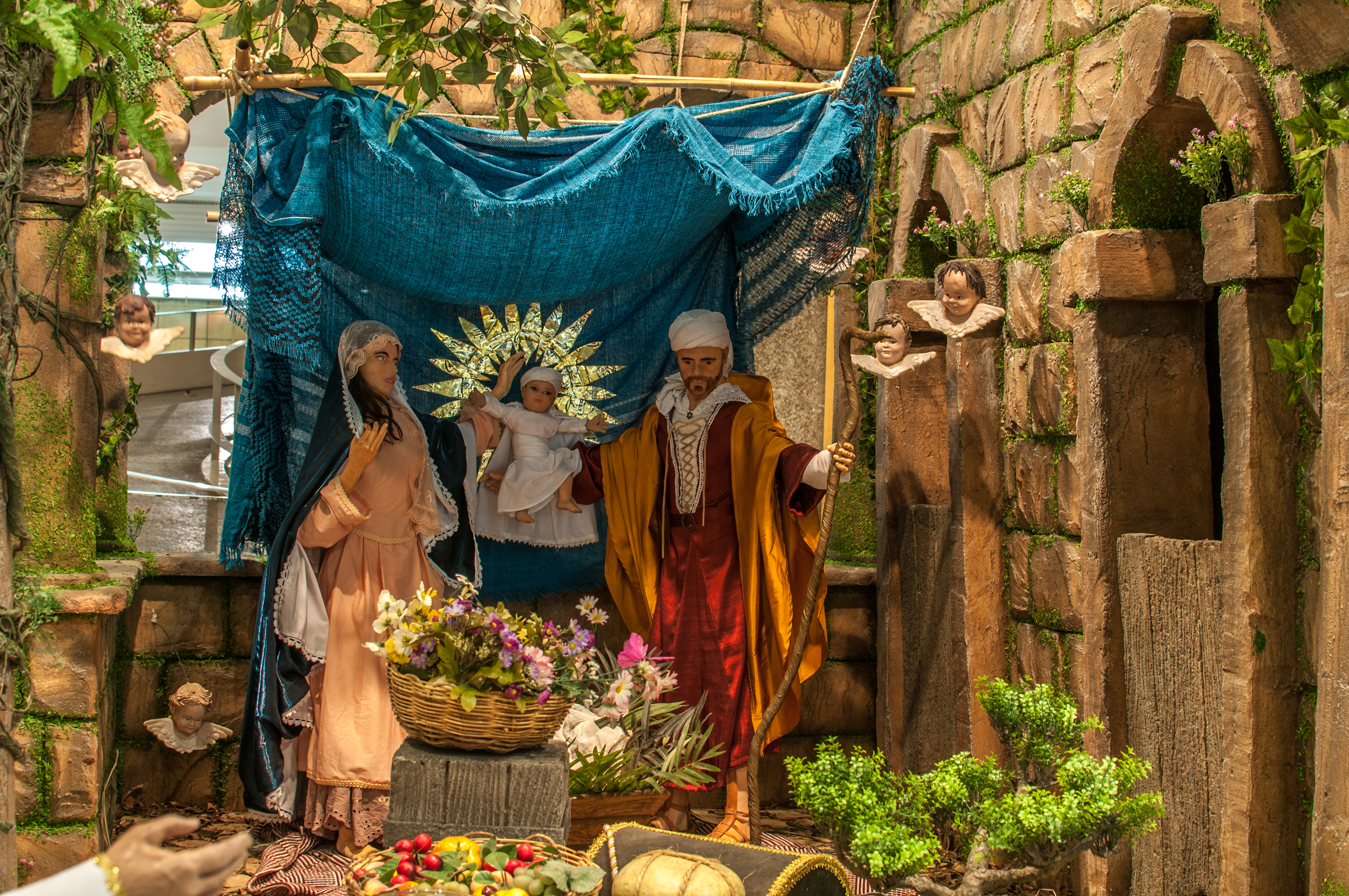
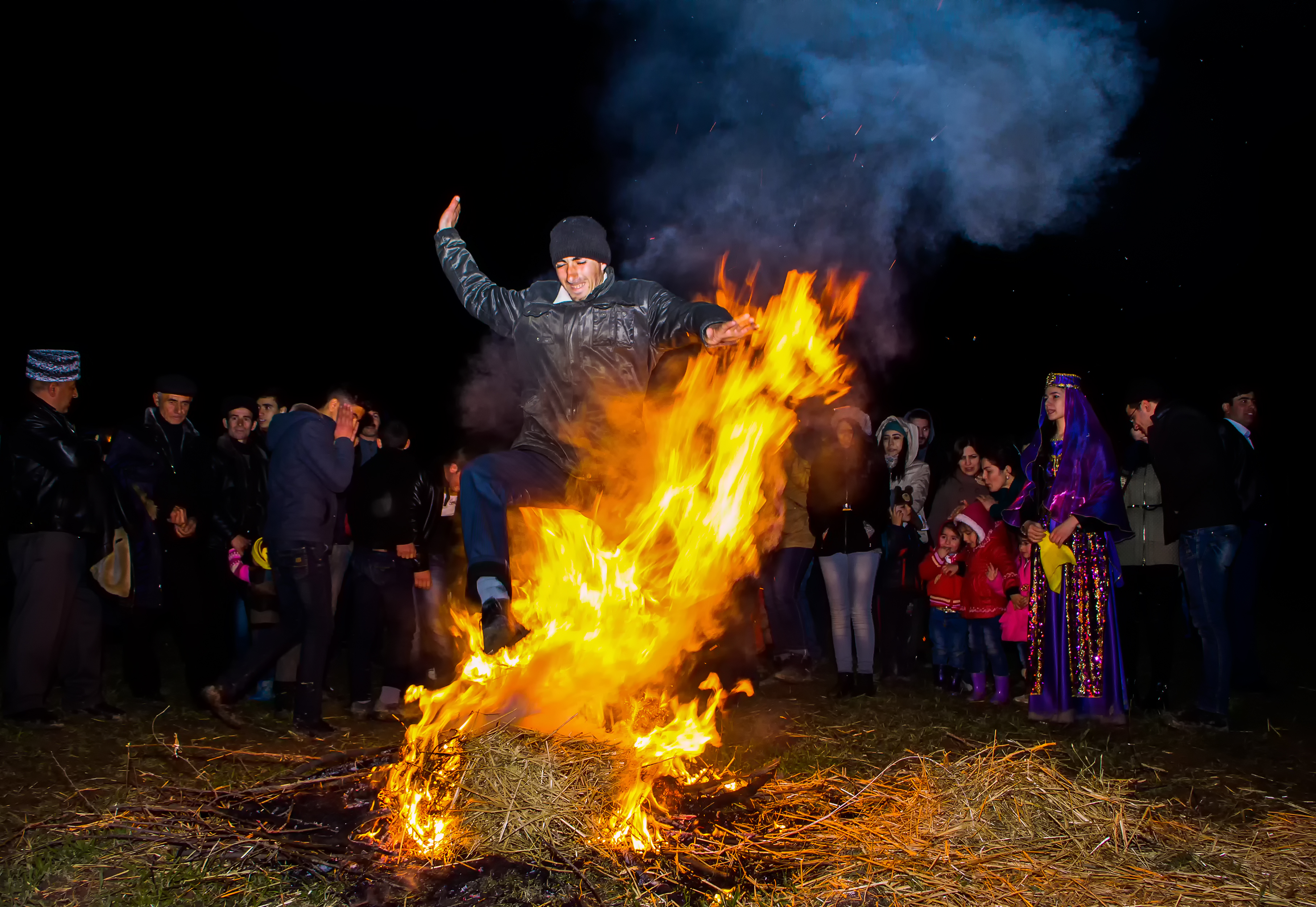
Clockwise from top left:
- Holi gathering in India
- Bastille Day military parade in France
- Eid al-Fitr meal in Malaysia
- Nowruz bonfire in Azerbaijan
- Christmas decorations in Brazil
- International Women's Day demonstration in Malawi

A holiday is a day or other period of time set aside for festivals or recreation. Public holidays are set by public authorities and vary by state or region. Religious holidays are set by religious organizations for their members and are often also observed as public holidays in religious majority countries. Some religious holidays, such as Christmas, have become secularised by part or all of those who observe them. In addition to secularisation, many holidays have become commercialised due to the growth of industry.

Holidays can be thematic, celebrating or commemorating particular groups, events, or ideas, or non-thematic, days of rest that do not have any particular meaning. In Commonwealth English, the term can refer to any period of rest from work, such as vacations or school holidays. In American English, "the holidays" typically refers to the period from Thanksgiving to New Year's (late November to January 1), which contains many important holidays in American culture.

== Terminology ==
The word holiday comes from the Old English word hāligdæg (hālig "holy" + dæg "day"). The word originally referred only to special religious days.

The word holiday has differing connotations in different regions. In the United States, the word is used exclusively to refer to the nationally, religiously, or culturally observed day(s) of rest or celebration or the events themselves, whereas in the United Kingdom and other Commonwealth nations, the word may refer to the period of time where leave from one's duties has been agreed upon and is used as a synonym for the US preferred vacation. This time is usually set aside for rest, travel, or participation in recreational activities, with entire industries targeted to coincide with or enhance these experiences. The days of leave may not coincide with any specific customs or laws. Employers and educational institutes may designate 'holidays' themselves, which may or may not overlap nationally or culturally relevant dates, which again comes under this connotation, but it is the first implication detailed that this article is concerned with. Modern use varies geographically. In North America, it means any dedicated day or period of celebration. In the United Kingdom, Australia, and New Zealand, holiday is often used instead of the word vacation.

== Global holidays ==
The celebration of the New Year has been a common holiday across cultures for at least four millennia. Such holidays normally celebrate the last day of a year and the arrival of the next year in a calendar system. In modern cultures using the Gregorian calendar, the New Year's celebration spans New Year's Eve on 31 December and New Year's Day on 1 January. However, other calendar systems also have New Year's celebration, such as Chinese New Year and Vietnamese Tet. New Year's Day is the most common public holiday, observed by all countries using the Gregorian calendar except Israel.

Christmas is a popular holiday globally due to the spread of Christianity. The holiday is recognised as a public holiday in many countries in Europe, the Americas, Africa and Australasia and is celebrated by over 2 billion people. Although a holiday with religious origins, Christmas is often celebrated by non-Christians as a secular holiday. For example, 61% of British people celebrate Christmas in an entirely secular way. Christmas has also become a tradition in some non-Christian countries. For many Japanese people, it has become customary to buy and eat fried chicken on Christmas.

Recently invented holidays commemorate a range of modern social and political issues and other important topics. The United Nations publishes a list of International Days and Weeks. International observances are often intended not only to commemorate an event or topic but also to encourage public awareness and action. The United Nations describes these observances as opportunities to educate the public, mobilize political will and resources, and promote international cooperation on issues of shared concern.. One such day is International Women's Day on 8 March, which celebrates women's achievements and campaigns for gender equality and women's rights. Earth Day has been celebrated by people across the world since 1970, with 10,000 events in 2007. It is a holiday marking the dangers of environmental damage, such as pollution and the climate crisis.

== Common secular holidays ==
Other secular holidays are observed regionally, nationally and across multi-country regions. The United Nations Calendar of Observances dedicates decades to a specific topic, but also a complete year, month, week and days. Holidays dedicated to an observance such as the commemoration of the ending of World War II, or the Shoah, can also be part of the reparation obligation as per UN General Assembly Resolution 60/147 Basic Principles and Guidelines on the Right to a Remedy and Reparation for Victims of Gross Violations of International Human Rights Law and Serious Violations of International Humanitarian Law.

Another example of a major secular holiday is the Lunar New Year, which is celebrated across East Asia and South East Asia. Many other days are marked to celebrate events or people, but are not strictly holidays as time off work is rarely given; examples include Arbor Day, International Worker's Day (celebrated sometimes under different names and on different days in different countries), and Earth Day (22 April).

== Public holidays ==
=== Substitute holidays ===
If a holiday coincides with another holiday or a weekend day a substitute holiday may be recognised in lieu. In the United Kingdom the government website states that "If a bank holiday is on a weekend, a 'substitute' weekday becomes a bank holiday, normally the following Monday.", and the list of bank holidays for the year 2020 includes Monday 28 December as "Boxing Day (substitute day)", as 26 December is a Saturday. The process of moving a holiday from a weekend day to the following Monday is known as Mondayisation in New Zealand.

=== National days ===
National days are days of significance to a nation or nation state. National days are typically celebratory of a state's independence (e.g. 4 July in the US), founding or unification (e.g. German Unity Day), the commemoration of a revolution (e.g. Bastille Day in France) or liberation (e.g. 9 May in the Channel Islands), or the feast day for a patron saint (e.g. St Patrick's Day in Ireland) or ruler (e.g. 5 December in Thailand). Belgium's national day, on the 21st of July, commemorates the oath of office of the first King of the Belgians (an uncle of the then-future Queen Victoria), i.e., so to say, the day Belgium became a kingdom by ending the initial interregnum. Every country other than Denmark and the United Kingdom observes a national day. In the UK, constituent countries have official or unofficial national days associated with their patron saint. A British national day has often been proposed, such as the date of the Acts of Union 1707 (1 May) or the King's Official Birthday, but never adopted.

Other days of national importance exist, such as one to celebrate the country's military or veterans. For example, Armistice Day (11 November) is recognised in World War I Allied nations (and across the Commonwealth) to memorialise those lost in the World Wars. National leaders will typically attend remembrance ceremonies at national memorial sites. Maybe surprisingly, World War II Armistice Day (and victory against Nazism) day, on 8 May, is much less celebrated.

== Religious holidays ==
Many holidays are linked to faiths and religions (see etymology above). Magha puja is associated with Buddhism. Christian holidays are defined as part of the liturgical year, the chief ones being Easter and Christmas. The Orthodox Christian and Western-Roman Catholic patronal feast day or "name day" is celebrated on each place's patron saint's day, according to the calendar of saints. Jehovah's Witnesses annually commemorate "The Memorial of Jesus Christ's Death", but do not celebrate other holidays with any religious significance such as Easter, Christmas or New Year. This holds especially true for those holidays that have combined and absorbed rituals, overtones or practices from non-Christian beliefs into the celebration, as well as those holidays that distract from or replace the worship of Jehovah. In Islam, the largest holidays are Eid al-Fitr (after Ramadan) and Eid al-Adha (at the end of the Hajj). Ahmadi Muslims additionally celebrate Promised Messiah Day, Promised Reformer Day, and Khilafat Day, but contrary to popular belief, neither are regarded as holidays. Hindus, Jains and Sikhs observe several holidays, one of the largest being Diwali (Festival of Light). Japanese holidays as well as few Catholic holidays contain heavy references to several different faiths and beliefs. Celtic, Norse, and Neopagan holidays follow the order of the Wheel of the Year. For example, Christmas ideas like decorating trees and colors (green, red, and white) have very similar ideas to modern Wicca (a modern Pagan belief) Yule which is a lesser Sabbat of the wheel of the year. Some are closely linked to Swedish festivities. The Baháʼí Faith observes 11 annual holidays on dates determined using the Baháʼí calendar. Jews have two holiday seasons: the Spring Feasts of Pesach (Passover) and Shavuot (Weeks, called Pentecost in Greek); and the Fall Feasts of Rosh Hashanah (Head of the Year), Yom Kippur (Day of Atonement), Sukkot (Tabernacles), and Shemini Atzeret (Eighth Day of Assembly).

=== Secularisation ===
Some religious holidays are also celebrated by many as secular holidays. For example, 61% of Brits celebrate Christmas in an entirely secular way. 81% of non-Christian Americans also celebrate Christmas. A 2019 Gallup poll found that two-thirds of Americans still celebrate an at least somewhat religious Christmas.

The claimed over-secularisation of particular holidays has caused controversy and claims of censorship of religion or political correctness. For example, in the 1990s, Birmingham City Council promoted a series of events in the Christmas season under the brand Winterval to create a more multi-cultural atmosphere about the seasonal festivities. The Bishop of Birmingham responded to the events, saying "the secular world, which expresses respect for all, is actually embarrassed by faith. Or perhaps it is Christianity which is censored". In the United States, conservative commentators have characterised the secularisation of Winter festivities as "the War on Christmas".

== Unofficial holidays ==
These are holidays that are not traditionally marked on calendars. These holidays are celebrated by various groups and individuals. Some promote a cause, others recognize historical events not officially recognized, and others are "funny" holidays celebrated with humorous intent. For example, Monkey Day is celebrated on December 14, International Talk Like a Pirate Day is observed on September 19, and Blasphemy Day is held on September 30. Other examples are April Fools' Day on April 1, Umar Day on December 1, Daniel Day on 29 August and World No Tobacco Day on May 31. Various community organizers and marketers promote odd social media holidays.

== Commercialism ==
In the United States, holidays have been drawn into a culture of consumption since the late 19th century. Many civic, religious and folk festivals have been commercialised. As such, traditions have been reshaped to serve the needs of industry. Leigh Eric Schmidt argues that the growth of consumption culture allowed the growth of holidays as an opportunity for increased public consumption and the orderly timing of it. Thus, after the Civil War, as department stores became the spatial expression of commercialism, holidays became the temporal expression of it.

== See also ==
- Christmas and holiday season
- Holiday heart syndrome
- International Day
- Public holiday
- List of holidays by country
- Commemoration (Anglicanism)
- Tribute
