= Mirzai =

Epithet of religious discrimination

Mirzai is a religious slur used to refer to Ahmadis by many South Asian Muslims, primarily in Pakistan, where they have been persecuted from early days and specially after the passage of Second Amendment to the Constitution of Pakistan, which declares that Ahmadia are not Muslims and Ordinance XX. Ahmadis are the followers of Mirza Ghulam Ahmad of Qadian.

In 2016, when the Punjab Housing and Town Planning Agency (PHTPA) was auctioned for plots in Chiniot district, they published an ad stating that "anyone related to the Qadiani/Ahmadi/ Lahori/ Mirzai sects cannot participate ....."

== Etymology and history ==
Etymologically, the term is derived from Mirza, a title of Persian origin denoting the rank of high nobleman or Prince. Mirza is the legal family name of Mirza Ghulam Ahmad, founder of Ahmadiyya.

== See also ==
- Qadiani
- Persecution of Ahmadis
- Human rights in Pakistan § Human rights violations against Ahmadi community
