= Ahmadiyya and other faiths =

Branch of Islam's external relationships

The Ahmadiyya branch in Islam has relationships with a number of other religions. Ahmadiyya consider themselves to be Muslim, but are not regarded as Muslim by mainstream Islam. Mainstream Muslim branches refer to the Ahmadiyya branch by the religious slur Qadiani, and to their beliefs as Qadianism a name based on Qadian, the small town in India's Punjab region where the founder of Ahmadiyya, Mirza Ghulam Ahmad was born.

== Christianity ==
See also: Dajjal in Ahmadiyya Islam

Mirza Ghulam Ahmad, the founder of the Ahmadiyya branch, engaged in debates, prayer duels and written arguments with Christian missionaries. The Ahmadi teaching that Jesus survived crucifixion, traveled east in order to preach to the Lost Tribes of Israel and died naturally, as promoted by Ghulam Ahmad, continues to be a source of friction with Christianity, in which vicarious atonement and the resurrection of Jesus are central tenets. The historian Francis Robinson states:

At their most extreme religious strategies for dealing with the Christian presence might involve attacking Christian revelation at its heart, as did the Punjabi Muslim, Ghulam Ahmad (d. 1908), who founded the Ahmadiyya missionary sect.

Ahmadiyya teachings also identify the emergence of the Antichrist (Al-Masih ad-Dajjal) as foretold in Islamic eschatology with the missionary expansion and colonial dominance of European Christianity. Ghulam Ahmad, who wrote extensively on this topic, identified the Antichrist principally with colonial missionaries who, according to him, were to be countered through argumentation rather than by physical warfare. While the term Dajjāl is taken as a reference to the forces of falsehood in matters of ideology and religious belief, prophecies concerning Gog and Magog (or Yaʾjūj and Maʾjūj) are taken as relating to the duplicity in the realm of politics and the shattering of world peace by the same forces – whose ancestors are thought to be the Slavic and Teutonic peoples – and are seen as embodied by the political (as opposed to religious) dominance of European powers. The conflict between Russia and the United States as two superpowers, or the militant rivalry between the communist and capitalist systems and their impact over the nations of the world, are thus seen as having occurred in accordance with prophecies concerning Gog and Magog. These views, too, have proven controversial with some Christians.

== Sikhism ==
Ahmadis have recognised Guru Nanak, the founder of Sikhism, as a holy man since Ghulām Ahmad carried out a detailed study of him and the history of Sikhism. Ahmadis believe that historically, Sikhism was a Sufi sect of Islam, a view strongly opposed by modern Sikhs.

== Hinduism ==
Ghulām Ahmad was involved in debates with leaders of the Arya Samaj movement of Hinduism and wrote several texts on the subject.

Ahmadis, like other Muslims, believe that the last, perfect message from God was brought to Muhammad. However, unlike mainstream Muslims, Ahmadis believe that many founders or significant figures of various faiths, including Krishna and Buddha, have brought messages from God. Ghulām Ahmad claimed to be the Kalki Avatar, the last avatar of Vishnu, whom Hindus were waiting for. However, he did not agree with the Hindu concept of incarnations of God. He considered Krishna and Rama human prophets who preached to others about the One God, and he believed that Hindus had distorted this view into polytheism over many thousands of years.

== Judaism ==
Ahmadiyya Muslims are on good terms with the Jews, unlike most other Islam branches. Ahmadis believe that the creation of the State of Israel accords with Biblical prophecies.

Kababir is a village in the city of Haifa in Israel and about 70 percent of the 2000 people who live there are Ahmadi Muslims. The elementary school in the village teaches Ahmadi children and Jewish children and Christian children together. A village spokesperson told the news outlet JNS that about 90 percent of the students are Ahmadi and the rest are Jewish or Christian. The same news outlet also said that Ahmadis in Israel are seen as friendly to Israel and as leaders in efforts to help different groups live in peace.

== Lahore Ahmadiyya Movement ==
The Lahore Ahmadiyya Movement does not see Ghulām Ahmad as a prophet. Ahmadis claim this is a result of misinterpreting his statements on his coming "in the spirit of Muhammad" (similar to John the Baptist coming in the spirit and power of Elijah). Ahmadi Muslims believe Ghulām Ahmad to be the Mahdi, Islam's prophesied messianic figure. Mainstream Muslims, however, say that he did not fulfill the prophecies of the Mahdi and that the title of Messiah was given only to Jesus. Thus, they consider him a false prophet. Because the Lahore Ahmadiyya Movement’s view of Ghulām Ahmad is closer to current mainstream Islamic thought than the view held by Ahmadis, its literature has found greater acceptance among the Muslim intelligentsia.

The government of Pakistan views members of both Ahmadi movements as non-Muslims, and this is recorded on their travel documents. But Ahmadi citizens from Western countries and some Muslim nations perform the Hajj and Umrah, as the Saudi government is not made aware that they are Ahmadis when they apply for a visa. A 1970 court decision in India upheld the right of Ahmadis to identify themselves as Muslims.

Ahmadis in Pakistan face restrictions that are written into the law. In 1974 the government changed the constitution to say that Ahmadis are not Muslims even though they see themselves as Muslims. In 1984 a law called Ordinance XX said that Ahmadis could not share their faith in public or use the Islamic greeting or call themselves Muslims. A group called Human Rights Watch wrote in 2019 that Ahmadis are still a main target of cases under laws about insulting religion and other laws made only for them.

The term Qadiani which is used to refer to Ahmadiyyas is pejorative to both Ahmadi sects the original Ahmadiyya and the Lahori Ahmadiyyas.

In the past, there has been widespread persecution of Ahmadis by other Muslims in India and Pakistan. Sporadic violence, as well as subtler persecution, continues today.

== Fulfillment of prophecy ==
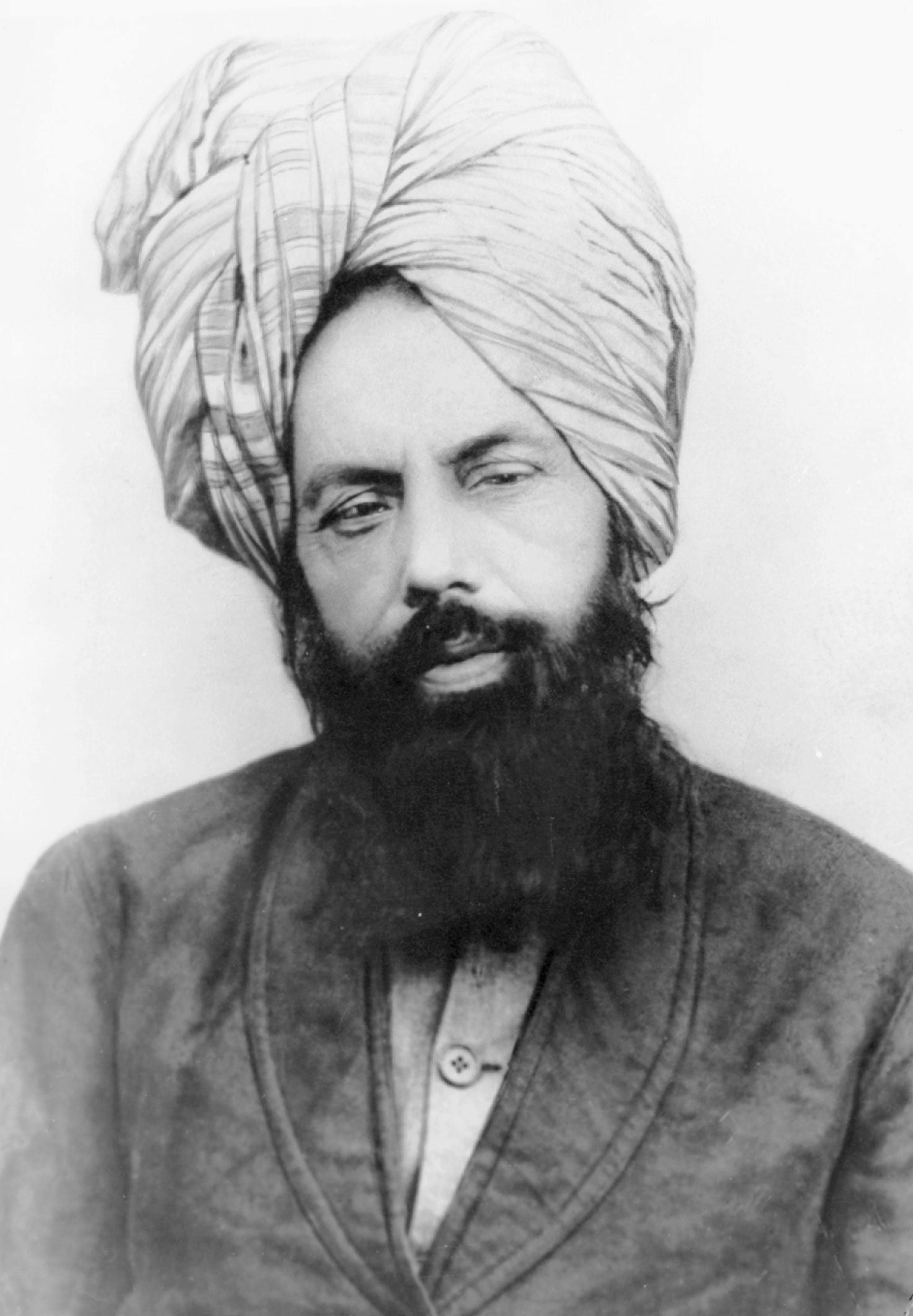
Mirzā Ghulām Ahmad, ca. 1897.

Ahmadis believe that the founders of all the major world religions were working towards the establishment of Islam in its broadest sense, as part of the divine scheme of the development of religion. They say that the completion and consummation of this development occurred with the coming of Muhammad, and that the "manifestation" of Muhammad’s prophethood and message was destined to be perfected with the coming of the Mahdi. Because they regard Ghulām Ahmad as the Mahdi, they believe he is the "Promised One" of all religions, fulfilling eschatological prophecies found in the scriptures of the Abrahamic religions, Zoroastrianism, Indian religions, Native American traditions and others.

=== Christianity ===
Ahmadis believe that many verses of the Old Testament and New Testament—such as those in the Book of Revelation, and those about the Second Coming of Christ in the 24th chapter of Matthew—were prophecies regarding the Messiah of the end times, and that they were fulfilled through the appearance of Ghulām Ahmad. Ahmadis also cite a passage in Chapter 12 of the Book of Daniel:

And from the time that the daily sacrifice shall be taken away, and the abomination that maketh desolate set up, there shall be a thousand two hundred and ninety days.

— Daniel, 12:11

"The time that the daily sacrifice shall be taken away" is interpreted by Ahmadis to mean the supersession of Judaic law by Islamic law, and "the abomination that maketh desolate" to mean the banning of idol worship brought about with the founding of Islam. Based on these interpretations and the day-year principle, Ahmadis believe that the "thousand two hundred and ninety days" are actually 1,290 years of the Islamic calendar, ending in 1875, when, according to Ahmadi belief, Ghulām Ahmad began to receive divine revelations with continuity. Ahmadis maintain that, as per Judeo-Christian prophecy regarding the coming of the Messiah and the Second Coming of Christ, Ghulām Ahmad appeared at the end of the 6,000th year from the time of Adam, and that with him, the final, 7th epoch of 1000 years began. It is also important to note that Ahmadis don't believe that the world is 6000 years old, but only the approximate time since the first prophet being 6000 years.

=== Islam ===
Ahmadis cite numerous passages from the Qur'an, tafsir and hadith in support of their views. They believe that the Messiah, Isa (i.e., Jesus), and the Mahdi whose comings are prophesied in Islam are, in fact, two titles or roles for the same person. According to Ahmadi thought, the promised redeemer is called "Isa" or "Masih" (Messiah) in relation to his task of refuting what they perceive as the erroneous doctrines of Christianity, and "Mahdi" in relation to his task of reforming and guiding Muslims. His advent is seen as a continuation of the prophethood of Muhammad.

=== Hinduism ===
Ahmadis regard Krishna as a prophet of God, citing the hadith and Qur'an. Ghulām Ahmad stated that the terms "avatar" and "prophet" were synonymous, and that the Avatar was equivalent to the Qur'anic Messenger.

=== Buddhism ===
Members of the Ahmadiyya community believe that Ghulām Ahmad was the fulfillment of the prophecy of the Maitreya, a future Buddha said to usher in an age of peace and security. Ghulām Ahmad himself wrote in his book Jesus in India that the Maitreya was actually Jesus, and that Jesus travelled to India, Kashmir and Tibet (predominantly Buddhist regions at the time) to preach to Jews who had migrated there and converted to other religions.

Ghulām Ahmad called himself the "reflection of all prophets", and regarded Gautama Buddha as a prophet. According to him, Jesus was both the Jewish Messiah and the Maitreya. Thus, Ghulām Ahmad claimed to have fulfilled the prophecy of the Second Coming of Jesus and, in turn, the prophecy of the Second Coming of the Maitreya as well.

=== "Reflection of All Prophets" ===
Ghulām Ahmad claimed that he had been bestowed with the attributes of all biblical and non-biblical prophets, in accordance with a verse of the Qur'an that says all prophets will converge into one person in the future. He said he had received a revelation in which God called him "the Champion of Allah in the mantle of Prophets". The biblical prophets include Abraham, Isaac, Jacob, Ishmael, Moses, David, Solomon and Jesus.

He also likened his role to that of Adam, as the initiator of a new age. In various writings, he stated that he and Adam were born twins on a Friday and that, just as Adam was born in the final hours of the sixth day of the week, he was born in the final years of the sixth millennium: As per the Qur'an and the Bible, a day in the estimation of God is a thousand years. Ahmadis also believe that Ghulām Ahmad was the Second Coming of Noah, citing the prophecy made by Jesus in Matthew 24:37–38.

Ghulām Ahmad further compared himself to the Qur'anic figure Dhul-Qarnayn, who is often equated with Cyrus the Great.
