= Ahmadiyya in Pakistan =

Islamic movement

Ahmadiyya in Pakistan are members of the Ahmadiyya Muslim Community. The number of Ahmadiyya in the country has been variously estimated to between 0.22% and 2.2% of Pakistan's population. The actual Ahmadiyya population could be higher because many Ahmadis hide their religious identity in government records to avoid persecution. Pakistan is the home to the largest population of Ahmadis in the world. The city of Rabwah in the province of Punjab used to be the global headquarters of the Ahmadiyya Community before they were moved to England.

Ahmadis in Pakistan have often been subjected to religious persecution and discrimination. According to a Pew Research Center, only 7% of Pakistanis consider Ahmadis as Muslims.

The Ahmadiyya movement originated in the city of Qadian. Following the independence of Pakistan, Ahmadis moved to the city of Rabwah to establish their headquarters. There have been a number of notable Pakistanis who have belonged to the Ahmadiyya Muslim Community, including the country's first Nobel Prize laureate, Abdus Salam and Pakistan's first foreign minister Muhammad Zafarullah Khan. Ahmadiyya and Mahdavia are the two main Mahdi'ist creeds in Pakistan.

== History ==
=== Jinnah's stance on Ahmadiyya ===
Jinnah was, contrary to popular belief, against declaring the status of Ahmadis as non-Muslims. A position which led him to be at odds with the Majlis-e Ahrar-e Islam, which called for the removal of Ahmadis from the Muslim League. Jinnah would not capitulate to this demand, which (amongst other factors) led to them parting ways.

=== Support in AIML in 1946 elections of India ===
Muhammad Zafarullah Khan, drafted Pakistan Resolution, Ahmad advised the Ahmadis to support All India Muslim League in the elections of 1945–6. Khan also gave a speech in London for the freedom of India.

=== Resignation of Khizar Hayat Tiwanna ===
Khizar Hayat headed the local government in Punjab in 1946, supported by Congress and Akali Dal. Muslim League opposed his government. Due to the boycotts engulfing the Punjab, he resigned as Premier on 2 March 1947. Later, he moved to Pakistan for a few years and then to California, where he died.

=== After the creation of Pakistan and creation of Rabwah ===
After the creation of Pakistan, some Ahmadis with the Mirza Basheer-ud-Din Mahmood Ahmad came to Pakistan and constructed their own city named Rabwah.

==== 1953 Anti-Ahmadiyya riots ====
A massive persecution was launched by anti-Ahmadiyya groups to persecute the Ahmadiyya Muslim Community by Islamists including Jamaat-e-Islami. The Government of Pakistan put down the unrest. The Ahrar sect was banned shortly after.

==== 1974 Anti-Ahmadiyya riots and Second Amendment to the Constitution of Pakistan ====
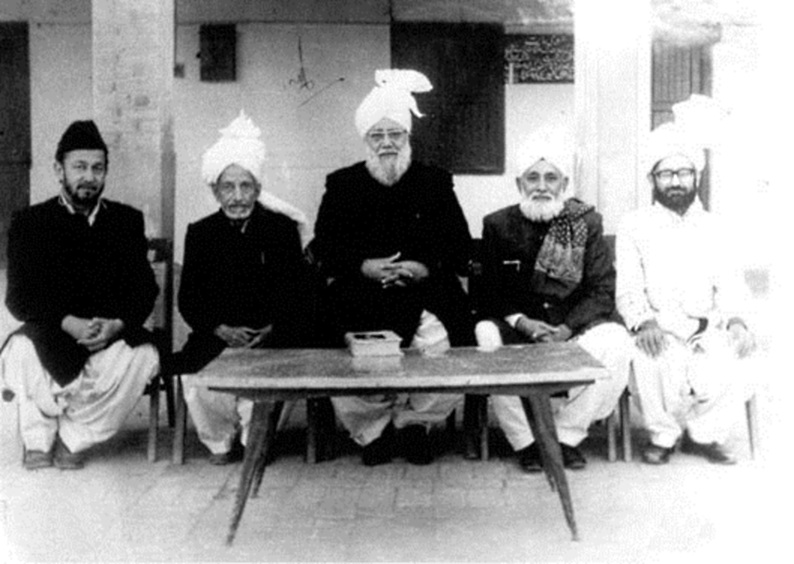
Mirza Nasir Ahmad (center), with Mirza Tahir Ahmad (right) and other Ahmadi personalities who represented the community in the Pakistan National Assembly in 1974

Amidst more massive persecution and the appearance of an Anti-Ahmadiyya movement called Tehreek-e-Khatme Nabuwwat, Pasban Khatme Nabuwwat launched by all Islamist parties, the Government of Pakistan under Zulfiqar Ali Bhutto passed the Second Amendment to the Constitution of Pakistan, declaring members "of the Quadiani Group or the Lahori Group (who call themselves Ahmadis or by any other name)", to be non-Muslims.

==== 1984 Anti-Ahmadiyya Amendment ====
Under president Zia-ul-Haq, an anti-Ahmadiyya ordinance was made in the Constitution of Pakistan which restricted the freedom of religion for Ahmadis. According to this law, Ahmadis cannot call themselves Muslim or "pose as Muslims" which is punishable by three years in prison.

==== Headquarters shifted to London ====
Following the enactment of these two amendments, which legalized persecution of Ahmadis, Mirza Tahir Ahmad, the caliph of the community, shifted the central headquarters to London in 1985.

== Demographics ==
Ahmadi Proportion of each Pakistani District in 2017 according to the Pakistan Bureau of Statistics

According to the 2023 census, there are 162,684 Ahmadis forming 0.07% of the total population, which is a decline from 191,737 in 2017 Census. Major decline in population was observed in Khyber Pakhtunkhwa where the population declined from 7,204 in 2017 to 951 in 2023; and in Balochistan where the population declined from 2,113 in 2017 to 557 in 2023.

However, the official census data on Ahmadiyya population is unreliable as many Ahmadis don't self-identify as such in census due to discrimination and many have boycotted the Census. According to the community estimates, the Ahmadi population is between 400,000 to 600,000, while the US Commission on International Religious Freedom estimates it to be 4 million.

As per the 2023 Census, the Lalian tehsil has the highest Ahmadi population at 13.41 %. And form majority in the city of Rabwah. Other population centres include Lahore, Gujranwala, Rawalpindi, Faisalabad, Sialkot, Sheikhupura, Jhelum in Punjab; Karachi, Larkana and Hyderabad in Sindh; Mirpur and Kotli in Azad Kasmir; Nowshera and Peshawar in Khyber Pakhtunkhwa.

== Community issues ==
Qadiani and Mirzai are the derogatory terms used for Ahmadis. Anti-Ahmadiyya groups have called for an Islamist jihad to finish off the community.

In 1974, Pakistan's Second Amendment to the Constitution officially declared Ahmadis to be non-Muslims. In 2018, Azad Jammu and Kashmir parliament also declared Ahmadis as non-Muslims through the Azad Jammu and Kashmir Interim Constitution (Twelfth Amendment) Bill, 2018.

== See also ==
- Minorities in Pakistan
- Islam in Pakistan
