= List of Gregorian Palestinian-related observances =

- March 30: Land Day (Palestine)
- April 5: Children's Day (Palestinian territories)
- May 5: Feast of al-Khadr or Saint George (Palestinian communities)
- May 15: Nakba Day (Palestinian communities)
- June 5: Naksa Day (Palestinian communities)
- Movable, generally November 29: International Day of Solidarity with the Palestinian People (2018 date: November 29)
- December 4: Eid il-Burbara (Israel and Palestine, not an official holiday)

== See also ==
- List of Gregorian Islamic observances
- List of Gregorian Jewish-related and Israeli holidays
- List of observances set by the Islamic calendar
- List of movable Eastern Christian observances
