= Qadiani =

Religious slur

Qadiani (Urdu: قادیانی, Hindi: क़ादियानी; pronounced [qäː.d̪ɪjäːniː]) is a religious slur used to refer to Ahmadi Muslims, primarily in Pakistan. The term originates from Qadian, a small town in northern India, the birthplace of Mirza Ghulam Ahmad, the founder of the Ahmadiyya movement. While it is pejorative to the Ahmadi Muslim Community, it is used in official Pakistani documents.

Pakistan officially persecutes Ahmadiyya and uses the term Qadiani to label members of the religion. The Second Amendment to the Constitution of Pakistan officially declares Ahmadiyya to be non-Muslims. Ordinance XX officially labels Ahmadi Muslims as Qadiani and prohibits them from any religious or social practices of the Muslim faith. The fourth caliph of the community, Mirza Tahir Ahmad, was forced to flee Pakistan under threat of arrest in 1984, prompting a diaspora of followers to the UK, Germany, and Canada. Ahmadiyya members are targets of death threats by majority Muslims, both inside Pakistan and in diaspora refuges.

The term is sometimes used in an academic context to distinguish the main Ahmadiyya Muslim Jamaat, referred to as Qadiani, from the separatist Lahore Ahmadiyya Movement, referred to as Lahori Ahmadis. In Pakistan, the term has also been used against liberal or moderate Muslims. It emerged in the early 20th century and peaked during the Zia-ul-Haq dictatorship in 1980s. Progressive lawyer Asma Jahangir was also labelled Qadiani by pro-Zia Islamists.

== See also ==
- Mirzai
- Ahmadiyya in Pakistan
- Persecution of Ahmadis
- Human rights in Pakistan
