= List of Gregorian Jewish-related and Israeli holidays =

- January 1: Public Domain Day (International, applies in Israel)
- January 1: Novy God Day (Russian-Jewish community)
- March 6: European Day of the Righteous
- April 25–28: Ziyarat al-Nabi Shu'ayb (public holiday in Israel, Druze minority)
- May 9: Victory Day (9 May) (Public holiday in Israel)
- June 30: Navy Day (Israel)
- July 17: International Firgun Day
- August 23: European Day of Remembrance for Victims of Stalinism and Nazism
- First Sunday in September: Federal Day of Thanksgiving, Repentance and Prayer (Germany, interfaith observance)
- September 9: Day of the Victims of Holocaust and of Racial Violence (Slovakia)
- November 4: Yitzhak Rabin Memorial (Israel, unofficial, but widely commemorated)
- Movable in November: Mitzvah Day International 2020 date: November 15
- November 30: Day to Mark the Departure and Expulsion of Jews from the Arab Countries and Iran (Israel)
- December 4: Eid il-Burbara (Israel/Palestinian territories, not an official holiday)
- December 24: Nittel Nacht
- December 31: Novy God Eve (Russian-Jewish community)

== See also ==
- List of observances set by the Hebrew calendar
- List of Gregorian Palestinian-related observances
- Holocaust Memorial Days
