= Marketing holiday =

A marketing holiday is an unofficial holiday which someone invents and promotes in the media. The point of the holiday is for typical users, community organizers, and marketers to share information within a theme.

While marketing holidays are often billed as "National days", they do not celebrate the creation of nations or non-sovereign countries and must be disambiguated from a National day and Public holiday.

Marketing holidays can generate large revenue spikes for e-commerce sites. In 2017 the Alibaba Group reported US$25.4 billion in sales on commercial holiday Singles Day.

== Social media ==
Many social media holidays are recently created but some have longer histories. Professional social media managers use these holidays to market the content which they are promoting. It is considered improper to post content which seems to be for a social media holiday, but which is actually a trick to make the audience view other content. Some people think social media holidays are annoying.
