= Navy Day (Israel) =

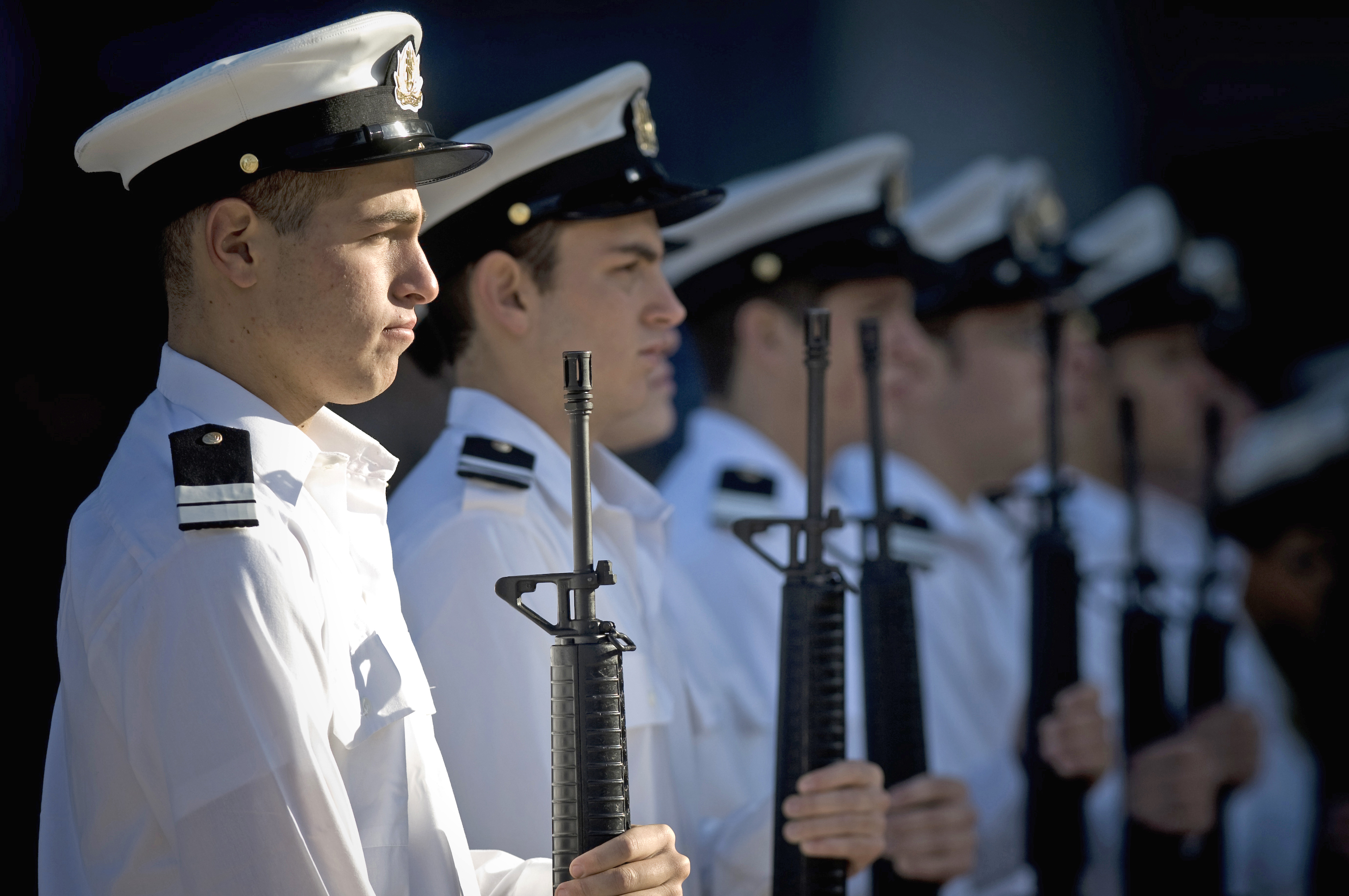
An honor guard of cadets wearing white uniforms for Navy Day.

In Israel, Navy Day (יום חיל הים) is celebrated on June 30. At this time in 1948 the Port of Haifa was captured by Israel during the 1947–1949 War of Independence/Palestine War. Traditionally, Navy Day is preceded by Memorial Evening.

In 1993 Admiral Ami Ayalon decided to hold the Israel Navy day in the last week of October, commemorating victories in several wars:

- The sinking of the Egyptian Navy flagship El Amir Farouq on 22 October 1948.
- Capture of the Egyptian frigate Ibrahim el Awal on 31 October 1956.
- The overwhelming successful actions of the Yom Kippur War, 6–24 October 1973.

Memorial Evening was rescheduled as well, marking the loss of destroyer INS Eilat on 21/10/1967. As of 2009 the celebrations have been elongated for a week, which for practical reasons, are held each year in August.

== See also ==
- List of Gregorian Jewish-related and Israeli holidays
