= Ordinance XX =

Law passed in Pakistan which prevents Ahmadi Muslims from being identified as Muslims

Anti-Islamic Activities of the Quadiani Group, Lahori Group and Ahmadis (Prohibition and Punishment) Ordinance, 1984

President of Pakistan
- Long title: An Ordinance to prohibit the Quadiani group, Lahori group and Ahmadis from indulging in anti-Islamic activities.
- Citation: Ordinance XX of 1984
- Enacted by: President of Pakistan (Muhammad Zia-ul-Haq)
- Effective: 26 April 1984

Amends
- Pakistan Penal Code; Code of Criminal Procedure, 1898; West Pakistan Press and Publications Ordinance, 1963

Summary
- Prohibits the worshipping and proselytizing of Ahmadiyya.
- Status: Current legislation

Ordinance XX (Urdu: 295-C آرڈیننس 20) is a legal ordinance of the Government of Pakistan that was promulgated under the regime of General Muhammad Zia-ul-Haq on 26 April 1984 and is meant to prohibit the practice of Islam and the usage of Islamic terms and titles for the Ahmadiyya Community. The ordinance bars Ahmadis, who are deemed Non-Muslims under the Pakistani constitution, from publicly practising the Islamic faith and also disallows them from using any Islamic texts for praying purposes. It is in addition to – but separate from – the 1974 Second Amendment to the Constitution of Pakistan. While the Second Amendment declared that Ahmadis are non-Muslims, the Ordinance prohibits Ahmadis from identifying themselves as Muslims.

The ordinance also debars Ahmadis from the use of any honorific titles and modes of address deemed specific to the Islamic community such as the greeting "As-salamu alaykum" (peace be upon you), reciting the Six Kalimas or the shahada (declaring belief in the oneness of God and the prophethood of Muhammad) etc., from building mosques and calling the Adhan (call to prayer), from undertaking Muslim modes of worship, from worshipping in non-Ahmadi mosques or public prayer rooms, and from making any citations from the Quran and Muhammad's hadith. Punishment for anyone convicted of doing any of the above is imprisonment of up to three years and a fine. Ahmadis, who self-identify as Muslims and observe Islamic practices, claim that the Ordinance criminalises their everyday life. Expressing the Kalima (Muslim creed) and greeting with peace in the Muslim way is a criminal offence for Ahmadis in Pakistan.

Unable to perform his duties as the leader of the Community without violating the Ordinance, Mirza Tahir Ahmad, the fourth leader of the Ahmadiyya community, referred to as caliph, was compelled to leave Pakistan and migrate following its promulgation. He left with his immediate family and 17 other Ahmadis for London on 29 April 1984, eventually moving the headquarters of the community to London during his years of exile.

== Precedent ==
Ordinance XLIV of 1980 attempted to address the same issue without specifically naming the Ahmadiyya. It amends the PPC as follows:

- 298-A: Use of derogatory remarks, etc., in respect of holy personages:*

Whoever by words, either spoken or written, or by visible representation, or by any imputation, innuendo or insinuation, directly or indirectly, defiles the sacred name of any wife (Ummul Mumineen), or members of the family (Ahle-bait), of the Holy Prophet (peace be upon him), or any of the righteous Caliphs (Khulafa-e-Rashideen) or companions (Sahaaba) of the Holy Prophet (peace be upon him) shall be punished with imprisonment of either description for a term which may extend to three years, or with fine, or with both.

== 1984 ordinance ==
Ordinance XX followed in 1984, with the following changes to the PPC:

298-B. Misuse of epithets, descriptions and titles, etc., reserved for certain holy personages or places:

(1) Any person of the Qadiani group or the Lahori group who call themselves 'Ahmadis' or by any other name who by words, either spoken or written, or by visible representation- (a) refers to or addresses, any person, other than a Caliph or companion of the Holy Prophet Muhammad (peace be upon him), as "Ameer-ul-Mumineen", "Khalifatul- Mumineen", Khalifa-tul-Muslimeen", "Sahaabi" or "Razi Allah Anho"; (b) refers to, or addresses, any person, other than a wife of the Holy Prophet Muhammad (peace be upon him), as "Ummul-Mumineen"; (c) refers to, or addresses, any person, other than a member of the family "Ahle-bait" of the Holy Prophet Muhammad (peace be upon him), as "Ahle-bait"; or (d) refers to, or names, or calls, his place of worship a "Masjid"; shall be punished with imprisonment of either description for a term which may extend to three years, and shall also be liable to fine. (2) Any person of the Qadiani group or Lahori group (who call themselves "Ahmadis" or by any other name) who by words, either spoken or written, or by visible representation refers to the mode or form of call to prayers followed by his faith as "Azan", or recites Azan as used by the Muslims, shall be punished with imprisonment of either description for a term which may extend to three years, and shall also be liable to fine.

298-C. Person of Qadiani group, etc., calling himself a Muslim or preaching or propagating his faith:

Any person of the Qadiani group or the Lahori group (who call themselves 'Ahmadis' or by any other name), who directly or indirectly, poses himself as a Muslim, or calls, or refers to, his faith as Islam, or preaches or propagates his faith, or invites others to accept his faith, by words, either spoken or written, or by visible representations, or in any manner whatsoever outrages the religious feelings of Muslims shall be punished with imprisonment of either description for a term which may extend to three years and shall also be liable to fine.

This law does not allow Ahmadi Muslims to call themselves Muslim or to "pose as Muslims", which are crimes punishable by three years in prison. This Ordinance and the 1974 amendment in the constitution effectively gave the state of Pakistan, the exclusive right to determine the meaning of the term "Muslim".

== Legal Challenge ==
Ahmadis challenged the ordinance in court, arguing that it violated the freedom of religion guaranteed by Article 20 of the Constitution of Pakistan. In 1993, the Supreme Court of Pakistan rejected this argument.

== Analysis ==
In the following four years from the regulation of the ordinance, there were more than 3,000 cases of Ahmadis charged with various offences under the regulation. Six were sentenced to 25 years imprisonment and four were sentenced to death. No executions have occurred to date and prosecutions have subsided in recent years. The United Nations Sub-Commission on Prevention of Discrimination and Protection of Minorities has called on the Commission on Human Rights to "call on the Government of Pakistan to repeal Ordinance XX."

One example is an Ahmadi (Rana Karamatullah) in Mansehra who was charged under Section 298C for "offering prayers" and "citing from the Holy Koran". Karamatullah had already been subjected to repeated arrests since 1984.

== See also ==
- Ahmadiyya in Pakistan
- Blasphemy law in Pakistan
