= Promised Messiah Day =

Commemoration day of the Ahmadiyya

Promised Messiah Day (Urdu: مسیح موعود کا دن, Arabic: يوم المسيح الموعود) is commemorated by members of the Ahmadiyya Muslims annually on March 23 which marked the day when Mirza Ghulam Ahmad whom the Ahmadis consider as the Promised Messiah took oath of allegiance from forty members in Ludhiana, Punjab, and initiated the movement.

== Origin ==
On March 23, 1889, Mirza Ghulam Ahmad founded the Ahmadiyya branch of Islam.
