= Promised Reformer Day =

Festival celebrated by Ahmadi Muslims

The Promised Reformer Day (Urdu: یوم مصلح موعود, Arabic: يوم المصلح الموعود) is celebrated by Ahmadi Muslims annually on 20 February in remembrance of the prophecy concerning the birth of an "illustrious son" to Mirza Ghulam Ahmad whom the Ahmadis regard as the Promised Messiah and Mahdi, and its fulfilment in the person of Mirza Bashir-ud-Din Mahmud Ahmad, the second Caliph of the Ahmadiyya Muslim Community. It is not a celebration of Mahmud Ahmad's birth which occurred on 12 January, but rather the commemoration of the prophecy and its fulfilment in his person.

== Background ==
In the 1880s, Mirza Ghulam Ahmad confronted several Hindu leaders who demanded to show them signs in favour of Islam as a living religion. In response to this, Mirza Ghulam Ahmad travelled to the town of Hoshiarpur where he spent 40 days in seclusion praying for divine signs in favour of Islam over other faiths. Subsequently, on 20 February 1886 he published a revelation which contained the prophecy concerning the birth of an illustrious son:

I confer upon thee a Sign of My mercy according to thy supplications. I have heard thy entreaties and have honoured thy prayers with My acceptance through My mercy and have blessed this thy journey. A sign of power, mercy, nearness to Me is bestowed on thee. A Sign of grace and beneficence is awarded to thee and thou art granted the key of success and victory. Peace on thee, O victorious one. Thus does God speak so that those who desire life may be rescued from the grip of death and those who are buried in the graves may emerge therefrom and so that the superiority of Islam and the dignity of God's word may become manifest unto the people and so that the truth may arrive with all its blessings and falsehood may depart with all its ills, and so that people may understand that I am the Lord of Power, I do whatever I will, and so that they may believe that I am with thee, and so that those who do not believe in God and deny and reject His religion and His Book and His Holy Messenger Muhammad, the chosen one (on whom be peace) may be confronted with a clear sign and the way of the guilty ones may become manifest. Rejoice, therefore, that a handsome and pure boy will be bestowed on thee. Thou wilt receive a bright youth who will be of thy seed and will be of thy progeny. A handsome and pure boy will come as your guest. His name is Emmanuel and Bashir. He has been invested with a holy spirit and he will be free from all impurity. He is the light of Allah. Blessed is he who comes from heaven. He shall be accompanied by grace (Fazl) which shall arrive with him. He will be characterized with grandeur, greatness and wealth. He will come into the world and will heal many of their disorder through his Messianic qualities and through the blessings of the Holy Spirit. He is the Word of Allah for Allah's mercy and honour have equipped him with the Word of Majesty. He will be extremely intelligent and understanding and will be meek of heart and will be filled with secular and spiritual knowledge. He will convert three into four. It is Monday, a blessed Monday. Son, delight of heart, high ranking, noble; a manifestation of the First and the Last, a manifestation of the True and the High; as if Allah has descended from heaven. His advent will be greatly blessed and will be a source of manifestation of Divine Majesty. Behold! a light cometh, a light anointed by God with the perfume of His pleasure. We shall pour our spirit into him and he will be sheltered under the shadow of God. He will advance rapidly and will be the means of procuring the release of those held in bondage. His fame will spread to the ends of the earth and peoples will be blessed through him. He will then be raised to his spiritual station in heaven. This is a matter decreed.

— The Green Announcement of 20 February 1886

== Fulfilment of the Prophecy ==
Mirza Ghulam Ahmad further declared on April 8, 1886, that it was disclosed to him that this son will be born within a period of nine years. However a few days after this announcement his wife, Nusrat Jehan gave birth to a daughter and his adversaries began alleging that his prophecy was proved false. Again in August 1887 a son was born to him but died in infancy, and again his critics alleged that the prophecy was falsified. Ghulam Ahmad pointed out that this son was the 'guest’ that was promised, and that the prophecy concerning the promised son began from the passage He will be accompanied by grace (Fazl) which shall arrive with him. On January 12, 1889, Mirza Mahmud Ahmad was born who is believed by the Ahmadiyya Muslim Community to be the promised son and one who according to Ahmadis displayed in his person all the qualities mentioned in the prophecy.

Ahmadis believe that the fulfilment of the prophecy spans the 52-year-long Caliphate of Mirza Bashir-ud-Din Mahmood Ahmad.

== Celebrations ==
Unlike Jalsa Salana which is often planned at national or International levels, Promised Reformer's Day is celebrated usually at a local or a regional level.

The Head of Worldwide Ahmadiyya Muslim Community, Mirza Masroor Ahmad, states the purpose of celebrating Musleh Maud Day as follows:

We celebrate Musleh Maud Day (Promised Reformer Day) in order to revive our faith and to remember the pledge that our objective is to establish the truth of Islam in the world. Musleh Maud Day is not the date of Hazrat Mirza Bashiruddin's birth or death, but it is a date to remind us of our responsibilities and to draw our attention to the progress of Islam, which indeed it should, and we should not merely enjoy it on an intellectual and ideological level.

— Friday Sermon, 20 February 2009
