= Caliphate Day =

Festival celebrated by Ahmadi Muslims

Caliphate Day or Khilafat Day (Urdu: یوم خلافت, Arabic: يوم الخلافة) is commemorated annually on 27 May by members of the Ahmadiyya Muslim Community. It marks the significance of the system of spiritual leadership within the community known as Khilafat. The current Khalifa is Mirza Masroor Ahmad, the 5th successor to Mirza Ghulam Ahmad, whom the Ahmadis consider the Promised Messiah.
