= Second Amendment to the Constitution of Pakistan =

Amendment to the Pakistani constitution

The Second Amendment to the Constitution of Pakistan (Urdu: آئین پاکستان میں دوسری ترمیم) became a part of the Constitution of Pakistan on 7 September 1974 under the Government of Prime Minister Zulfikar Ali Bhutto. It declared that Ahmadis (whom the amendment calls Qadianis) were non-Muslims. It also made way for the establishment of a centralized citizen registry.

== Article 30 ==
Article 30 of the Second Amendment of the constitution of Pakistan related to identification and maintenance of a statistical database of the citizens of Pakistan. It was stipulated that every person should have a state-issued ID. This set the basis of Pakistan's National Identity Card (NIC) system.

== Article 260(3) ==
This states that for legal purposes the term "Muslim" does not include anyone who does not believe that Muhammad was the last prophet, and that "non-Muslim" includes anyone "of the Quadiani Group or the Lahori Group (who call themselves Ahmadis or by any other name), or a Baháʼí" as well as Buddhists, Christians, Hindus, Sikhs, and Zoroastrians.

== See also ==
- Ordinance XX
- Aalmi Majlis Tahaffuz Khatm-e-Nubuwwat
