= Ahmadiyya =

Islamic messianic movement founded by Mirza Ghulam Ahmad

Ahmadiyya Muslim Jama'at Ahmadiyya Muslim Community
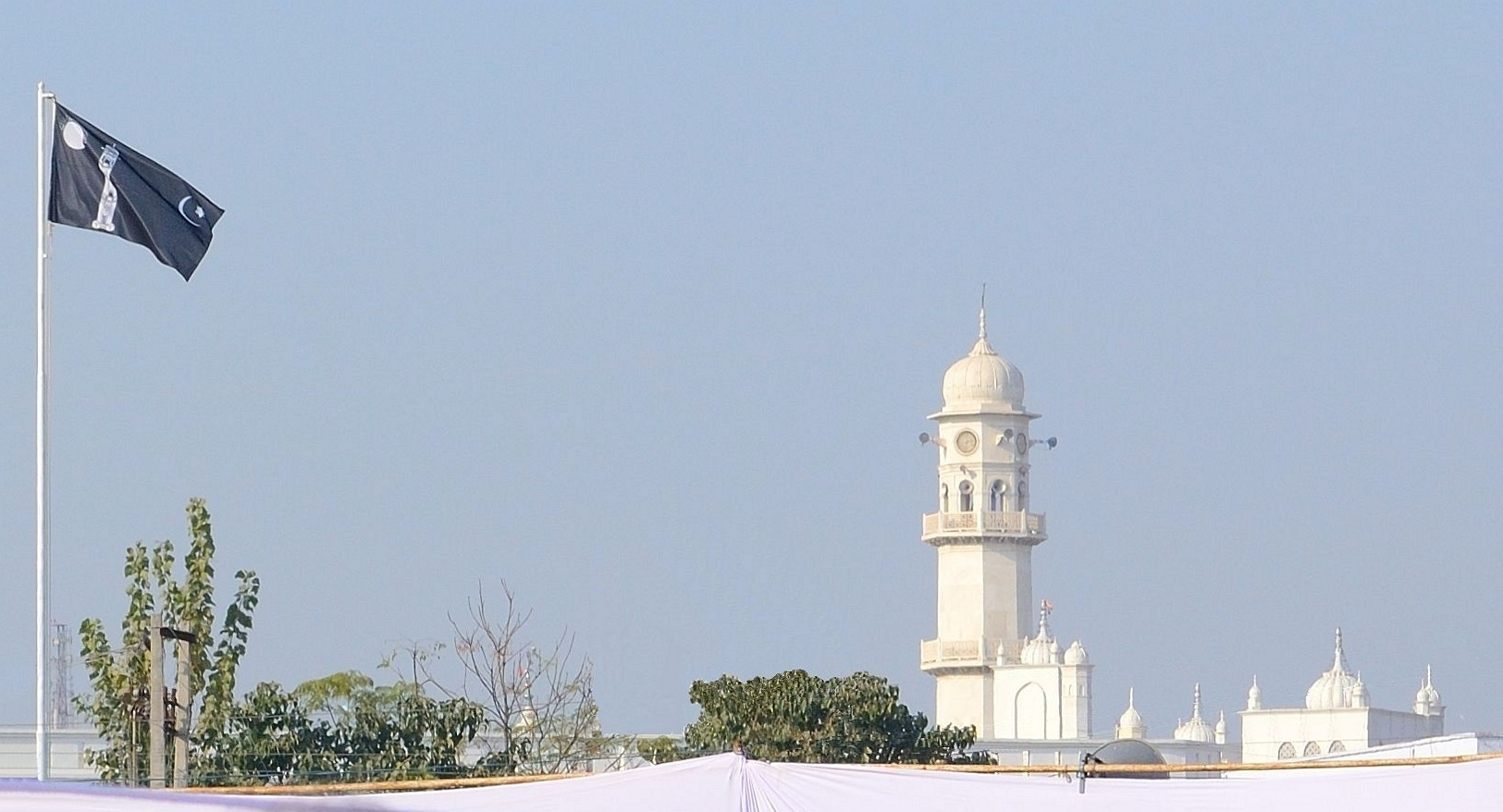
- The White Minaret and the Ahmadiyya flag in Qadian, India. For Ahmadi Muslims, the two symbolize the advent of Mirza Ghulam Ahmad.
- Type: Islamic movement
- Scripture: Quran and various books by Mirza Ghulam Ahmad
- Caliph: Mirza Masroor Ahmad
- Founder: Mirza Ghulam Ahmad
- Origin: 19th century British India
- Separated from: Sunni Islam
- Number of followers: 15–20 million
- Official website: www.alislam.org

Ahmadiyya (/ˌɑː(x)məˈdiː(j)ə/), officially the Ahmadiyya Muslim Jama'at (Arabic: الجماعة الإسلامية الأحمدية, romanized: al-Jamāʿah al-Islāmīyyah al-Aḥmadīyyah; Urdu: جماعتِ احمدیہ مسلمہ, romanized: Jamā‘at-i-Aḥmadiyah Muslimah) is an Islamic messianic movement originating in British India in the late 19th century. It was founded by Mirza Ghulam Ahmad (1835–1908), who said he had been divinely appointed as both the promised Messiah and Mahdi expected by Muslims to appear towards the end times and bring about, by peaceful means, the final triumph of Islam; as well as to embody, in this capacity, the expected eschatological figure of other major religious traditions. Adherents of the Ahmadiyya—a term adopted expressly in reference to Muhammad's alternative name Ahmad—are known as Ahmadi Muslims or simply Ahmadis.

Ahmadi thought emphasises the belief that Islam is the final dispensation for humanity as revealed to Muhammad and the necessity of restoring it to its true intent and pristine form, which had been lost through the centuries. Its adherents consider Ahmad to have appeared as the Mahdi—bearing the qualities of Jesus in accordance with their reading of scriptural prophecies—to revitalise Islam and set in motion its moral system that would bring about lasting peace. They believe that upon divine guidance he purged Islam of foreign accretions in belief and practice by championing what is, in their view, Islam's original precepts as practised by Muhammad and the early Muslim community. Ahmadis thus view themselves as leading the propagation and renaissance of Islam.

Mirza Ghulam Ahmad established the Community on 23 March 1889 by formally accepting allegiance from his supporters. Since his death, the Community has been led by a succession of Caliphs. By 2017 it had spread to 210 countries and territories of the world with concentrations in South Asia, West Africa, East Africa, and Indonesia. The Ahmadis have a strong missionary tradition, having formed the first Muslim missionary organisation to arrive in Britain and other Western countries. Currently, the community is led by its caliph, Mirza Masroor Ahmad, and is estimated to number between 15 and 20 million worldwide.

The movement is almost entirely a single, highly organised group. However, in the early history of the community, some Ahmadis dissented over the nature of Ahmad's prophetic status and succession. They formed the Lahore Ahmadiyya Movement, which has since dwindled to a small fraction of all Ahmadis.

Ahmadiyya's recognition of Ahmad as a prophet has been characterised as heretical by mainstream Muslims, who believe that Muhammad was the final prophet, and the Ahmadi movement has faced non-recognition, takfir, and persecution in many parts of the world.

== Naming and etymology ==
The Ahmadiyya movement was founded in 1889, but the name Aḥmadīyah was not adopted until about a decade later. In a manifesto dated 4 November 1900, Mirza Ghulam Ahmad announced that the name chosen to identify the movement from other Muslim groups would be in reference to Muhammad's alternative name Aḥmad. According to him, the meaning of the name Muḥammad—"the most praised"—comported with the traits of glory and indicated the triumphant career of the Islamic prophet following his migration to Medina; but Aḥmad, an Arabic elative form meaning "highly praised" and also "one who praises the most", comported with the beauty of his sermons and conveyed the perseverance and forbearance that characterised his earlier life at Mecca. Accordingly, these two names reflected two aspects of Islam and in later times it was the latter aspect that was destined to be the chief characteristic of its progress. Ghulam Ahmad deemed it a blameworthy innovation (bid‘ah) to label an Islamic school after anyone other than Muhammad. The announcement of 1900 stated:

The name which is appropriate for this Movement and which we prefer for ourselves and for our Jamā'at is Muslims of the Aḥmadīyah Section. And it is permissible that it also be referred to as Muslims of the Aḥmadī school.

=== Lexicology ===
The term Aḥmadīyah—formed by way of suffixation (nisba) from Aḥmad and the suffix -īya(t) (comparable to the English -ness)—is an abstract noun used in reference to the movement itself; while the term Aḥmadī (adjectivally denoting affiliation to Aḥmad) is a noun used in reference to an adherent of the movement, whether male or female. Despite Ahmadis dissociating the name from their founder, deriving it instead from Islamic prophecy and the name variant of Muhammad, some Sunni Muslims, especially in the Indian subcontinent from where the movement originated, refer to Ahmadis using the pejorative terms Qādiyānī or Mirzaī—derived from Qadian, the home town of Ghulam Ahmad, or from Mirza, one of his titles, respectively. Both are externally attributed names and are never used by the Ahmadiyya Muslim Community itself.

== History ==
Ahmadiyya timeline
1882	Mirza Ghulam Ahmad (without publicity) says he is the Mujaddid of the fourteenth Islamic century
1889	Mirza Ghulam Ahmad establishes the Ahmadiyya Muslim movement
1890	Mirza Ghulam Ahmad announces that he is 'The Promised Messiah' and 'The Imam Mahdi' of the Latter days
1908	Mirza Ghulam Ahmad dies in Lahore. Hakeem Noor-ud-Din is elected as the First Caliph
1914	Mirza Basheer-ud-Din Mahmood Ahmad is elected as the Second Caliph
1947	Mirza Basheer-ud-Din Mahmood Ahmad migrates to Lahore, Pakistan
1948	Mirza Basheer-ud-Din Mahmood Ahmad establishes the city of Rabwah as the new headquarters of the Community
1965	Mirza Nasir Ahmad is elected as the Third Caliph
1982	Mirza Tahir Ahmad is elected as the Fourth Caliph
1984	Mirza Tahir Ahmad migrates to London, England, moving the headquarters to London
2003	Mirza Masroor Ahmad is elected as the Fifth Caliph
2019	The headquarters of the Ahmadiyya Muslim Community is moved from the Fazl Mosque in Southfields, London to Islamabad in Tilford, Surrey

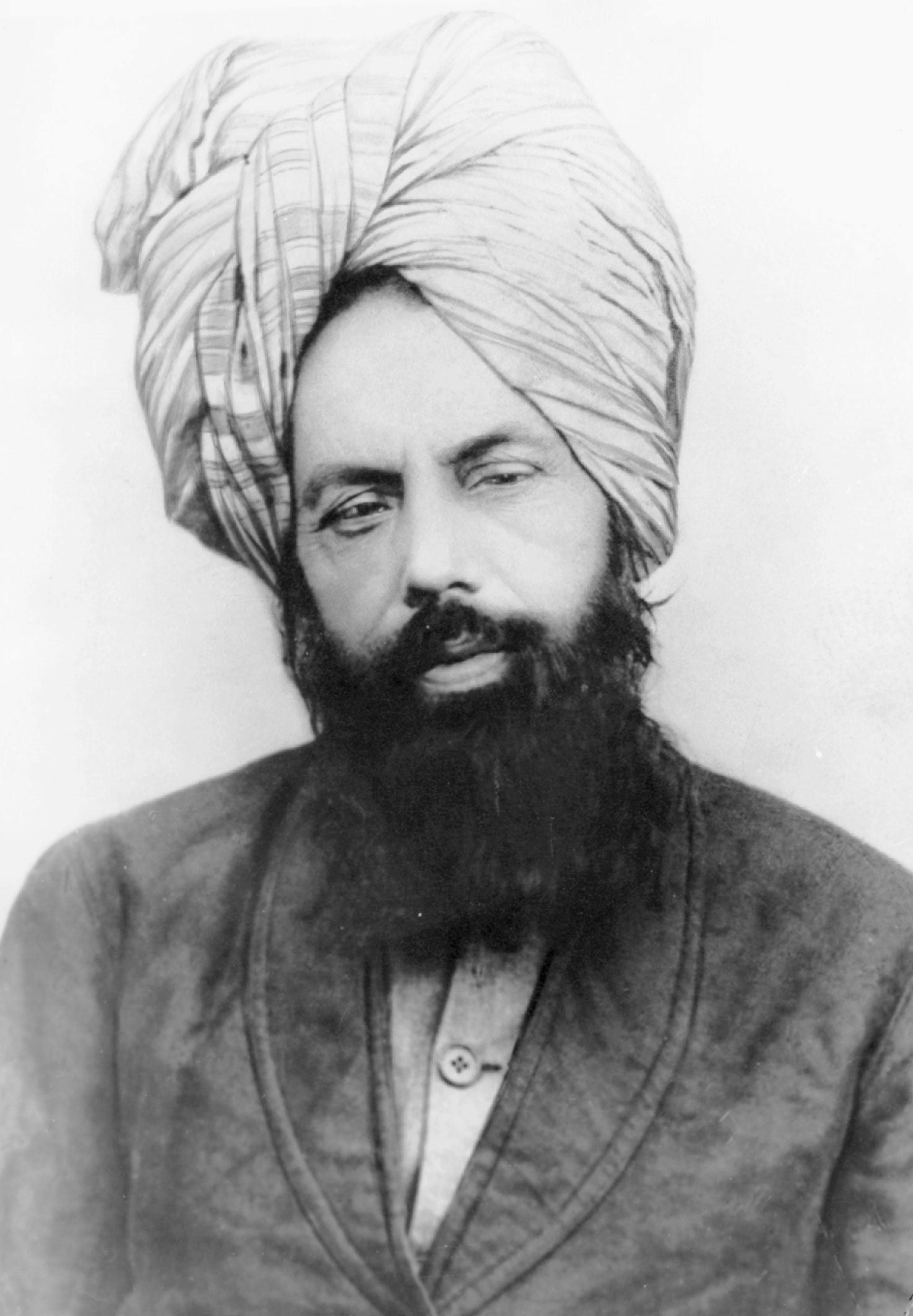
Mirza Ghulam Ahmad, the founder of the Ahmadiyya movement

Formally, the history of the Ahmadiyya Muslim Community begins when Mirza Ghulam Ahmad took the oath of allegiance from a number of his companions at a home in Ludhiana, India, on 23 March 1889. However, the history can be taken back to the early life of Ahmad, when he reportedly started receiving revelations concerning his future, but also as far back as the traditions of various world religions. At the end of the 19th century, Mirza Ghulam Ahmad of Qadian proclaimed himself to be the "Centennial Reformer of Islam" (Mujaddid), metaphorical second coming of Jesus and the Mahdi (guided one) awaited by the Muslims and obtained a considerable number of followers especially within the United Provinces, the Punjab and Sindh. He and his followers believe that his advent was foretold by Muhammad, the Prophet of Islam, and also by many other religious scriptures of the world. Ahmadiyya emerged in India as a movement within Islam, also in response to the Christian and Arya Samaj missionary activity that was widespread in the 19th century.

The Ahmadiyya faith believes that it represents the latter-day revival of the religion of Islam. Overseas Ahmadiyya missionary activities started at an organised level as early as 1913 (for example, the UK mission in Putney, London). For many modern nations of the world, the Ahmadiyya movement was their first contact with the proclaimants from the Muslim world. According to Richard Brent Turner, "until the mid-1950s the Ahmadiyyah was arguably the most influential community in African-American Islam". Today, the Ahmadiyya Muslim Community has one of the most active missionary programs in the world. It is particularly large in Africa. In the post colonial era, the Community is credited for much of the spread of Islam in the continent.

=== First Caliphate ===
After the death of Mirza Ghulam Ahmad, Hakeem Noor-ud-Din was unanimously elected as his first successor and Caliph of the Community. Within the stretch of his Caliphate, a period which lasted six years (1908–1914), he oversaw a satisfactory English translation of the Quran, the establishment of the first Ahmadiyya Muslim mission in England and the introduction of various newspapers and magazines of the Community. As a result of growing financial requirements of the Community, he set up an official treasury. Most notably, however, he dealt with internal dissensions, when a number high-ranking office bearers of the Ahmadiyya Council disagreed with some of the administrative concepts and the authority of the Caliph.

=== Second Caliphate ===
The Ahmadiyya Muslim Community Flag, first designed in 1939, during the Second Caliphate

Soon after the death of the first caliph, Mirza Basheer-ud-Din Mahmood Ahmad was elected as the second caliph, in accordance with the will of his predecessor. However, a faction led by Maulana Muhammad Ali and Khwaja Kamal-ud-Din strongly opposed his succession and refused to accept him as the next caliph, which soon led to the formation of the Lahore Ahmadiyya Movement. This was due to certain doctrinal differences they held with the caliph such as the nature of Mirza Ghulam Ahmad's prophethood and succession. It has also been theorised that a clash of personalities with that of the dissenters and the caliph himself, who had a relatively poor academic background, also played a role. However, the Lahore Ahmadiyya movement, which settled in Lahore, has had relatively little success and has failed to attract a sizeable following. In the history of the Community, this event is referred to as 'The Split' and is sometimes alluded to a prophecy of the founder.

Elected at a young age, Mahmood Ahmad's Caliphate spanned a period of almost 52 years (1914–1965). He established the organisational structure of the Community and directed extensive missionary activity outside the subcontinent of India. Several weeks following his election, delegates from all over India were invited to discuss about propagation of Islam. Two decades later, Mahmood Ahmad launched a twofold scheme for the establishment of foreign missions and the moral upbringing of Ahmadi Muslims. The Tehrik-e-Jadid (the 'new scheme') and Waqf-e-Jadid ('new dedication') respectively, initially seen as a spiritual battle against the oppressors of the Ahmadi Muslims, called upon members of the Community to dedicate their time and money for the sake of their faith. In time the scheme produced a vast amount of literature in defence of Islam in general and the Ahmadiyya beliefs in particular. The funds were also spent on the training and dispatching of Ahmadi missionaries outside the Indian sub-continent.

During his time, missions were established in 46 countries, mosques were constructed in many foreign countries and the Quran published in several major languages of the world. Although the Community continued to expand in the course of succeeding Caliphates, sometimes at a faster pace, the second caliph is credited for much of its inception. Ahmad wrote many written works, the most significant of which is the ten volume commentary of the Quran.

=== Third Caliphate ===
Mirza Nasir Ahmad was elected on 8 November 1965, and he served as Caliph until 1982. He expanded the missionary work initiated by his predecessor, particularly in Africa. Following a 1970 tour of West Africa, the first visit to Africa by an Ahmadi Caliph, he established the Nusrat Jehan Scheme, which now operates numerous medical facilities and schools in Africa.

He also established the Fazl-e-Umar Foundation in honour of his predecessor, oversaw the compilations of dialogues and sayings of the founder of the Community, Mirza Ghulam Ahmad, and also directed the complete collection of the dreams, visions and verbal revelations of Mirza Ghulam Ahmad.

He is seen by Ahmadis as having shown great leadership and guidance to the Community during the period when the Government of Pakistan passed a constitutional amendment declaring the Community to be non-Muslims. He coined the popular Ahmadiyya motto love for all, hatred for none.

=== Fourth Caliphate ===
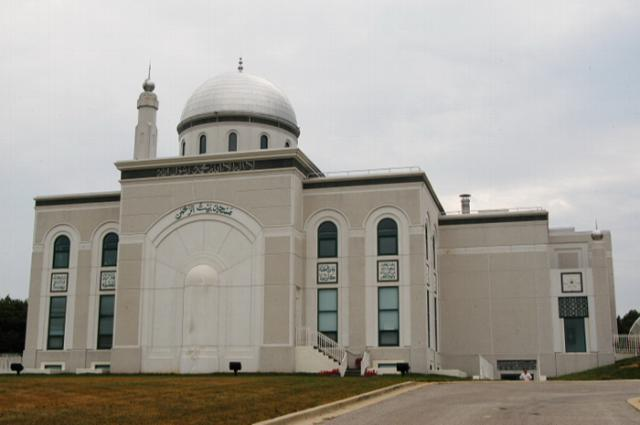
Baitur Rehman Mosque near Washington, D.C., is one of several mosques inaugurated by the fourth caliph.

Mirza Tahir Ahmad was elected as the fourth Caliph on 10 June 1982, a day after the death of his predecessor. He remained Caliph until his death in 2003. Following the promulgation of Ordinance XX by the government of Pakistan in 1984, that jeopardised the safety of the community and made it impossible for the Caliph to perform his duties, he relocated to London, England, establishing new headquarters at Fazl Mosque, the first mosque in London. The migration marked a new era in the history of the Community. Ahmad launched the first Muslim satellite television network, Muslim Television Ahmadiyya, instituted the Waqfe Nau Scheme, a program to dedicate Ahmadi Muslim children to the service of the Community, and established various funds for humanitarian causes, including the Maryum Shaadi Fund, the Syedna Bilal Fund for victims of persecution, and the disaster relief charity Humanity First.

Tahir Ahmad held regular, question and answer sessions in Urdu and English with people of various faiths, professions and cultural backgrounds. He also wrote many books, including Islam's Response to Contemporary Issues, Murder in the name of Allah, Absolute Justice, Kindness and Kinship, Gulf Crisis and The New World Order and his magnum opus Revelation, Rationality, Knowledge and Truth.

=== Fifth Caliphate ===
Following the death of the fourth Caliph in 2003, the Electoral College for the first time in the history of the Community convened in London, after which Mirza Masroor Ahmad was elected as the fifth and current Caliph of the Ahmadiyya Muslim Community.

== Summary of beliefs ==
The Six articles of Islamic Faith and the Five Pillars of Islam constitute the basis of Ahmadi belief and practice. Likewise, Ahmadis accept the Quran as their holy text, face the Kaaba during prayer, follow the sunnah (normative practice of Muhammad) and accept the authority of the ahadith (sing. hadith; reported sayings of and narrations about Muhammad). Their acceptance of the authority of the four Rightly Guided caliphs (successors) as legitimate leaders of the Muslim community following Muhammad's death, their belief that a caliph need not be a descendant of Muhammad, and use of the Kutub al-Sittah fundamentally aligns Ahmadis with the Sunni tradition of Islam rather than with the Shi'a tradition. In matters of fiqh (Islamic jurisprudence), Ahmadis reject strict adherence (taqlid) to any particular school of thought (madhhab), giving foremost precedence to the Quran and sunnah, but usually base their rulings on the Hanafi methodology in cases where these sources lack clear elaboration.

Ahmadi teachings state that all the major world religions have divine origins and are part of the divine plan towards the establishment of Islam as the final religion, because Islam is the most complete and perfected the previous teachings of other religions, which (they believe) have drifted away from their original form and been corrupted. The message which the founders of these religions brought was, therefore, essentially the same as that of Islam, albeit incomplete. The completion and consummation of the development of religion came about with the advent of Muhammad. However, the global conveyance, recognition and eventual acceptance of his message (i.e., the perfection of the manifestation of Muhammad's prophethood) was destined to occur with the coming of the Mahdi. Thus, Ahmadi Muslims regard Mirza Ghulam Ahmad as that Mahdi and, by extension, the "Promised One" of all religions fulfilling eschatological prophecies found in the scriptures of the Abrahamic religions, as well as Zoroastrianism, the Indian religions, Native American traditions and others. Ahmadi Muslims believe that Ahmad was divinely commissioned as a true reflection of Muhammad's prophethood to establish the unity of God and to remind humankind of their duties towards God and His creation. Summarising the Islamic faith, Ahmad writes:

There are only two complete parts of faith. One is to love God and the other is to love humankind to such a degree that you consider the suffering and the trials and tribulations of others as your own and that you pray for them.

== Articles of faith ==
Ahmadi Muslims subscribe to the same beliefs as the majority of Muslims, but with a difference of opinion on the meaning of Khatam an-Nabiyyin. The six articles of faith are identical to those believed in by Sunni Muslims, and are based on the Quran and traditions of Muhammad:

=== Unity of God ===
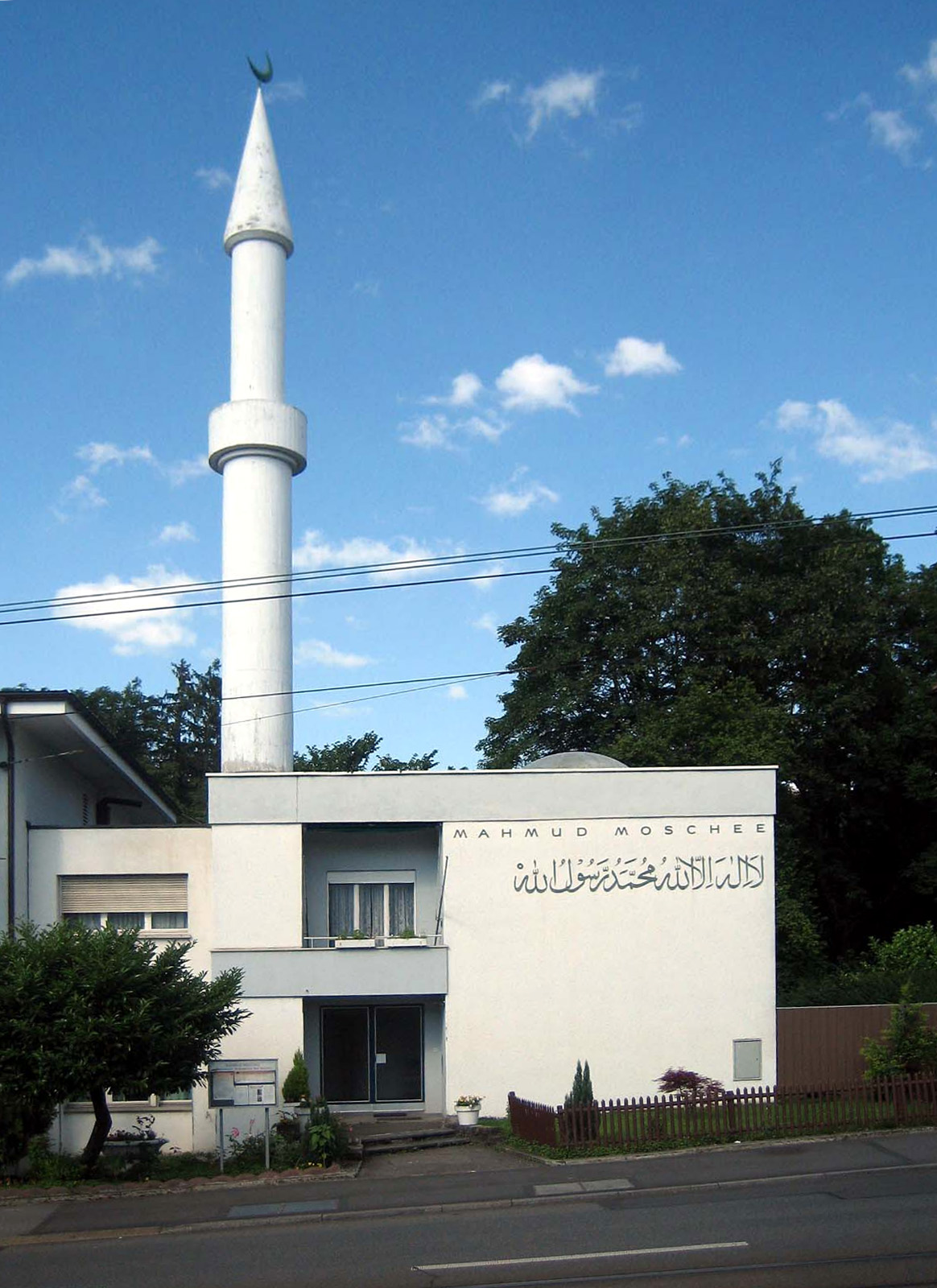
The Shahada, outside the Mahmood Mosque in Zurich, proclaiming the oneness of God

Ahmadi Muslims firmly believe in the absolute Unity of God. Acknowledgement of this principle is the most important and the cardinal principle of Islam as interpreted by the Community. All other Islamic beliefs spring from this belief. The belief in the Unity of God is thought to influence a person's life in all its aspects and is believed to have much wider meaning and deeper applications. For example, elaborating on the Oneness of God, the Quranic verse "There is no all-encompassing power except God" is believed to negate all forms of fear with the exception of the fear of God. It instills a sense of complete dependence on God and that every good emanates from him. In general, the belief in unity of God is thought to liberate believers from all forms of carnal passions, slavery and perceptions of earthly imprisonment. The founder of the Community writes:

The Unity of God is a light which illumines the heart only after the negation of all deities, whether they belong to the inner world or the outer world. It permeates every particle of man's being. How can this be acquired without the aid of God and His Messenger? The duty of man is only to bring death upon his ego and turn his back to devilish pride. He should not boast of his having been reared in the cradle of knowledge but should consider himself as if he were merely an ignorant person, and occupy himself in supplications. Then the light of Unity will descend upon him from God and will bestow new life upon Him.

It is further believed that the Islamic concept of Oneness of God inculcates the realisation of the Oneness of the human species and thus removes all impediments in this regard. The diversity of all human races, ethnicities and colours are considered worthy of acceptance. Moreover, it is thought that a belief in the Unity of God creates a sense of absolute harmony between the Creator and the creation. It is understood that there can be no contradiction between the word of God and work of God.

=== Angels ===
The belief in angels is fundamental to the Ahmadiyya Muslim Community. They are spiritual beings created by God to obey him and implement his commandments. Unlike human beings, angels have no free will and cannot act independently. Under God's command, they bring revelations to the Prophets, bring punishment on the Prophets' enemies, glorify God with his praise, and keep records of human beings' deeds. Angels are not visible to the physical eye. Yet, according to the Ahmadiyya Muslim Community, they do sometimes appear to man in one form or another. This appearance, however, is not physical but a spiritual manifestation. Ahmadi Muslims regards angels as celestial beings who have their own entity as persons. The major role they play is the transmission of messages from God to human beings. According to the Quran, the entire material universe as well as the religious universe is governed by some spiritual powers, which are referred to as angels. Whatever they do is in complete submission to the Will of God and the design that he created for things. According to Islam, as interpreted by Ahmadi Muslims, they cannot deviate from the set course or functions allocated to them, or from the overall plan of things made by God.

=== Books ===
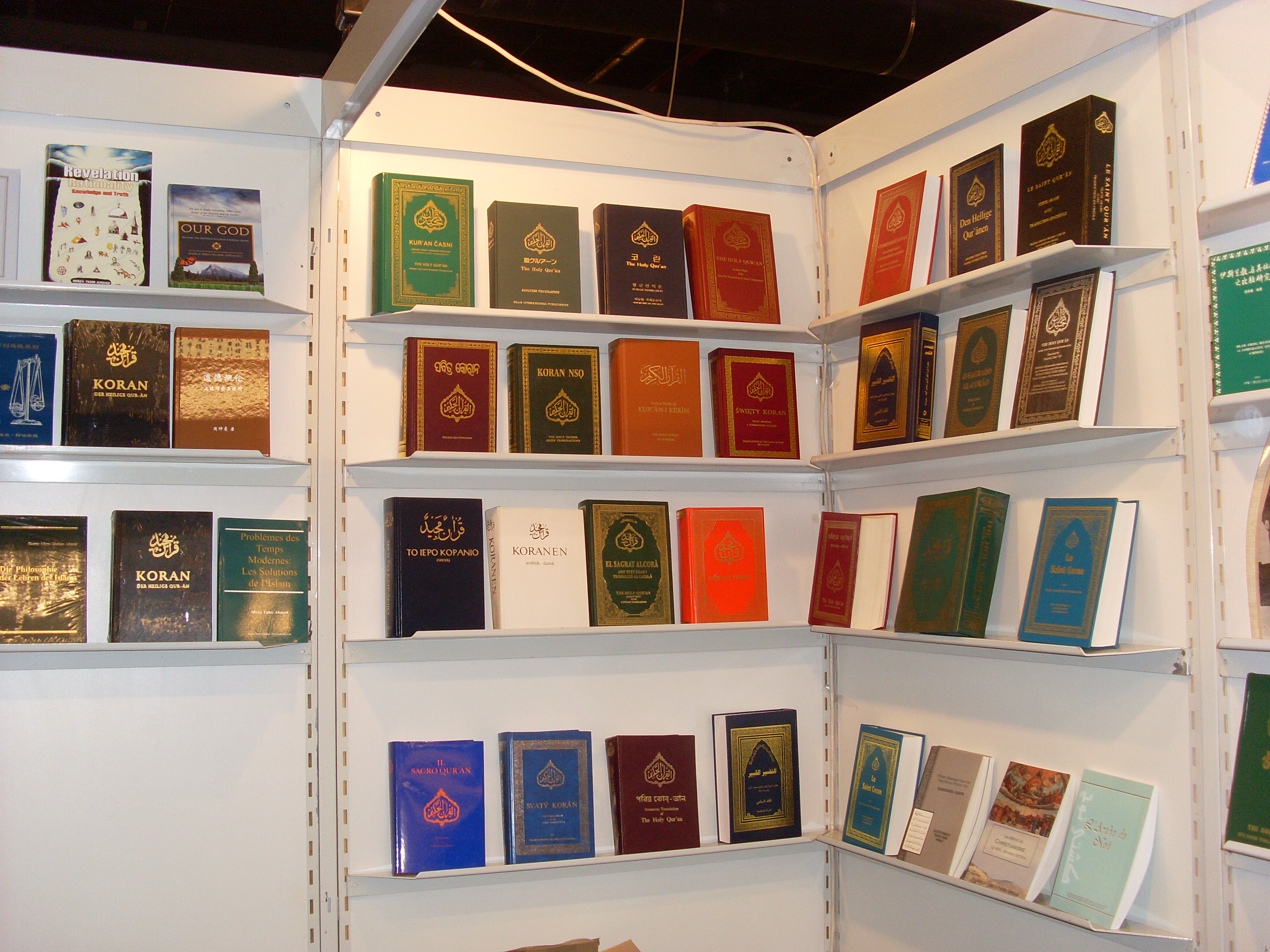
Some of the many Quran translations by Ahmadi translators at the 2009 Frankfurt Book Fair

For Ahmadi Muslims, the third article in Islam is concerned with the belief in all the divine scriptures as revealed by God to his Prophets. This includes the Torah, the Gospel, the Psalms, the scrolls of Abraham, and the Quran. Before the advent of Islam, the history of religion is understood as a series of dispensations where each messenger brought teachings suitable for the time and place. Thus, at the time of their inception, the divine teachings sent by God concurred in their fundamentals, with the exception of minor details that were chosen to complement the time and place. With the exception of the Quran, it is believed that the divine scriptures are susceptible to human interpolation. Islam recognises that God sent his prophets to every nation and isolated communities of the world. Thus, according to the Ahmadi teachings, books outside of the Abrahamic tradition, such as the Vedas and Avesta are too considered as being of divine origin. Among the recognised books, the Community believes that the Quran is the final divine scripture revealed by God to humankind. The teachings of the Quran are considered timeless.

=== Prophets ===
According to the Ahmadi Muslim view, the fourth article of faith in Islam is concerned with the belief in all divine prophets sent by God. Ahmadi Muslims believe that when the world is filled with unrighteousness and immorality, or when a specific part of the world displays these attributes, or when the followers of a certain law (religion) become corrupt or incorporate corrupted teachings into the faith, thus making the faith obsolete or in need of a Divine Sustainer, then a Prophet of God is sent to re-establish his Divine Will. Aside from the belief in all prophets in the Quran and the Old Testament, the Community also regards Zoroaster, Krishna, Buddha, and Confucius as prophets.

According to the Ahmadiyya belief, the technical Islamic terms 'warner' (natheer), 'prophet' (nabi), 'messenger' (rasul) and 'envoy' (mursal) are synonymous in meaning. However, there are two kinds of prophethood as understood by the Community: Law-bearing prophets, who bring a new law and dispensation, such as Moses (given the Torah) and Muhammad (given the Quran); and non-law-bearing prophets, who appear within a given dispensation. Adam is regarded as the first human with whom God spoke and revealed to him his divine will and thus the first prophet, but is not regarded as the first human on earth by the Ahmadiyya Muslim Community, contrary to traditional Islamic, Jewish and Christian interpretations. This view is based on the Quran itself, according to the Ahmadiyya Muslim Community.

=== Day of Judgement ===
The fifth article of faith relates to the Day of Judgment. According to the Ahmadis, after belief in one God, belief in the Day of Judgement is the most emphasised doctrine mentioned in the Quran, when the dead will be resurrected and accounts will be taken of their deeds. People with good records will enter into Heaven while those with bad records will be thrown into Hell. Hell is understood in Ahmadiyya as a temporary abode, lasting an extremely long time but not everlasting, much like in mainstream Judaism. It is thought to be like a hospital, where souls are cleansed of their sins, and this view is based on the Quran and Hadith.

=== Divine decree ===
The Ahmadiyya Muslim Community believes that divine decree controls the eventual outcome of all actions in this universe. Within the boundaries of divine decree, man is given free will to choose the course.

=== Five Pillars of Islam ===
The Pillars of Islam (arkan al-Islam; also arkan ad-din, 'pillars of religion') are five basic acts in Islam, considered obligatory for all Ahmadi Muslims. The Quran presents them as a framework for worship and a sign of commitment to the faith. Ahmadi Muslims share the same version of the Five Pillars as other branches of Islam. They are:

1. shahadah (creed)
2. daily prayers (salah)
3. almsgiving (zakah)
4. fasting during Ramadan
5. hajj, the pilgrimage to Mecca, to be made at least once in a lifetime.

== Distinct teachings ==
Although the Five Pillars of Islam and the six articles of belief of Ahmadi Muslims are identical to those of mainstream Sunni Muslims and central to Ahmadi belief, distinct Ahmadiyya beliefs include:

=== Second Coming ===
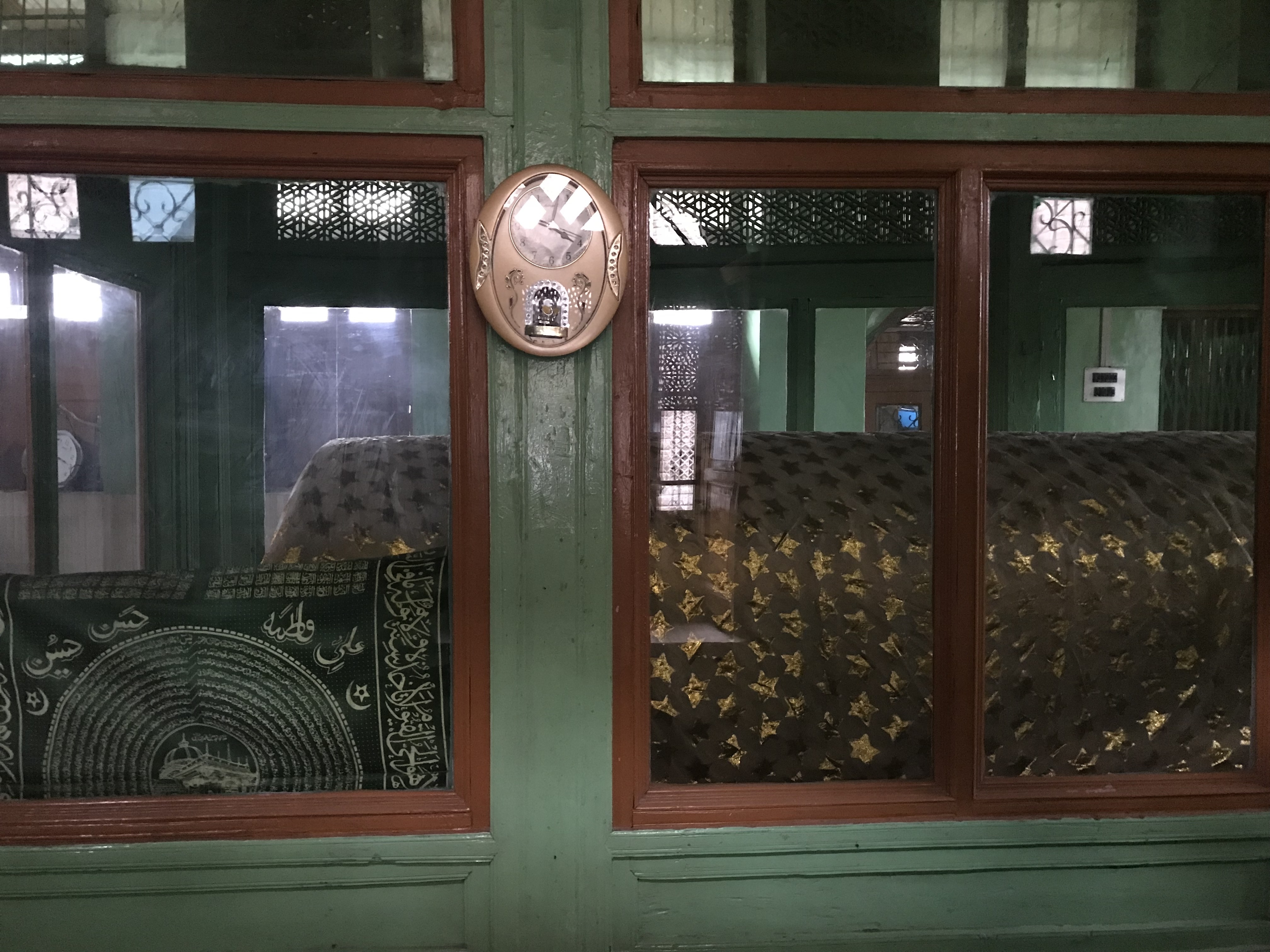
Roza Bal shrine in Srinagar, Kashmir

Contrary to mainstream Islamic belief, Ahmadi Muslims believe that Jesus was crucified and survived the four hours on the cross. Ahmadis believe that Jesus died in Kashmir of old age whilst seeking the Lost Tribes of Israel.

=== Virgin birth ===
In his book Chashma-e-Ma'rifat, community founder Mirza Ghulam Ahmad argued that the event can be explained through rare natural biological phenomena, specifically proposing that Mary possessed biological characteristics of both sexes (human hermaphroditism). Rather than viewing it as a supernatural suspension of physical law, Ahmadiyya theology interprets the occurrence through natural biological mechanisms. Through these interpretations, Ahmadi Muslims affirm the Qur'anic account of the virgin birth of Jesus.

=== Seal of Prophets ===
Although Ahmadi Muslims believe that the Quran is the final message of God for humankind, they also believe that God continues to communicate with his chosen individuals in the same way he is believed to have done in the past. All of God's attributes are eternal. In particular, Ahmadi Muslims believe that Muhammad brought prophethood to perfection and was the last law-bearing prophet and the apex of humankind's spiritual evolution. New prophets can come, but they must be completely subordinate to Muhammad and will not be able to exceed him in excellence nor alter his teaching or bring any new law or religion. They are also thought of as reflections of Muhammad rather than independently made into Prophets, like the Prophets of antiquity.

=== Jihad ===
According to Ahmadi Muslim belief, jihad can be divided into three categories:

- Jihad of the highest order (Jihad al-Akbar) is the struggle against the self and one's own tendencies to anger, lust and hatred;
- Major jihad (jihad al-kabīr) is the peaceful propagation of Islam, with special emphasis on spreading the true message of Islam by the pen;
- Jihad of the lower order jihad al-asghar is armed struggle only to be resorted to in self-defence in response to extreme persecution involving threat to both life and ability to practice religion, and even then only under the direct instruction of the Caliph.

Mirza Ghulam Ahmad taught that military is not necessary in the present age as Islam, as a religion, is not being attacked militarily but through literature and other media, and that the response should be likewise. Ahmadi Muslims believe that hatred should be answered with love.

Concerning terrorism, the fourth Caliph of the Community wrote in 1989:

[Islam] categorically rejects and condemns every form of terrorism. It does not provide any cover or justification for any act of violence, be it committed by an individual, a group or a government.

=== Abrogation ===
Unlike most scholars of other Islamic sects, Ahmadi Muslims do not believe that any verses of the Quran abrogate other verses. All Quranic verses have equal validity, in keeping with their emphasis on the "unsurpassable beauty and unquestionable validity of the Qur'ān". The harmonisation of apparently incompatible rulings is resolved through their juridical deflation in Ahmadī fiqh, so that a ruling (considered to have applicability only to the specific situation for which it was revealed), is effective not because it was revealed last, but because it is most suited to the situation at hand.

=== Religion and science ===
Ahmadi Muslims believe that there cannot be a conflict between the word of God and the work of God, and thus religion and science must work in harmony with each other. With particular reference to this relationship, the second Caliph of the Ahmadiyya Muslim Community states that in order to understand God's revelation, it is necessary to study His work, and in order to realise the significance of His work, it is necessary to study His word. According to the Nobel laureate, Abdus Salam, a devout Ahmadi Muslim, 750 verses of the Quran (almost one eighth of the book) exhort believers to study Nature, to reflect, to make the best use of reason in their search for the ultimate and to make the acquiring of knowledge and scientific comprehension part of the community's life.

=== Cyclical nature of history ===
A final distinct belief is the notion that the history of religion is cyclic and is renewed every seven millennia. The present cycle from the time of the Biblical Adam is split into seven ages, parallel to the seven days of the week, with periods for light and darkness. Mirza Ghulam Ahmad appeared as the promised Messiah at the sixth epoch heralding the seventh and final age of humankind.

== Demographics ==
Ahmadiyya Muslim population map

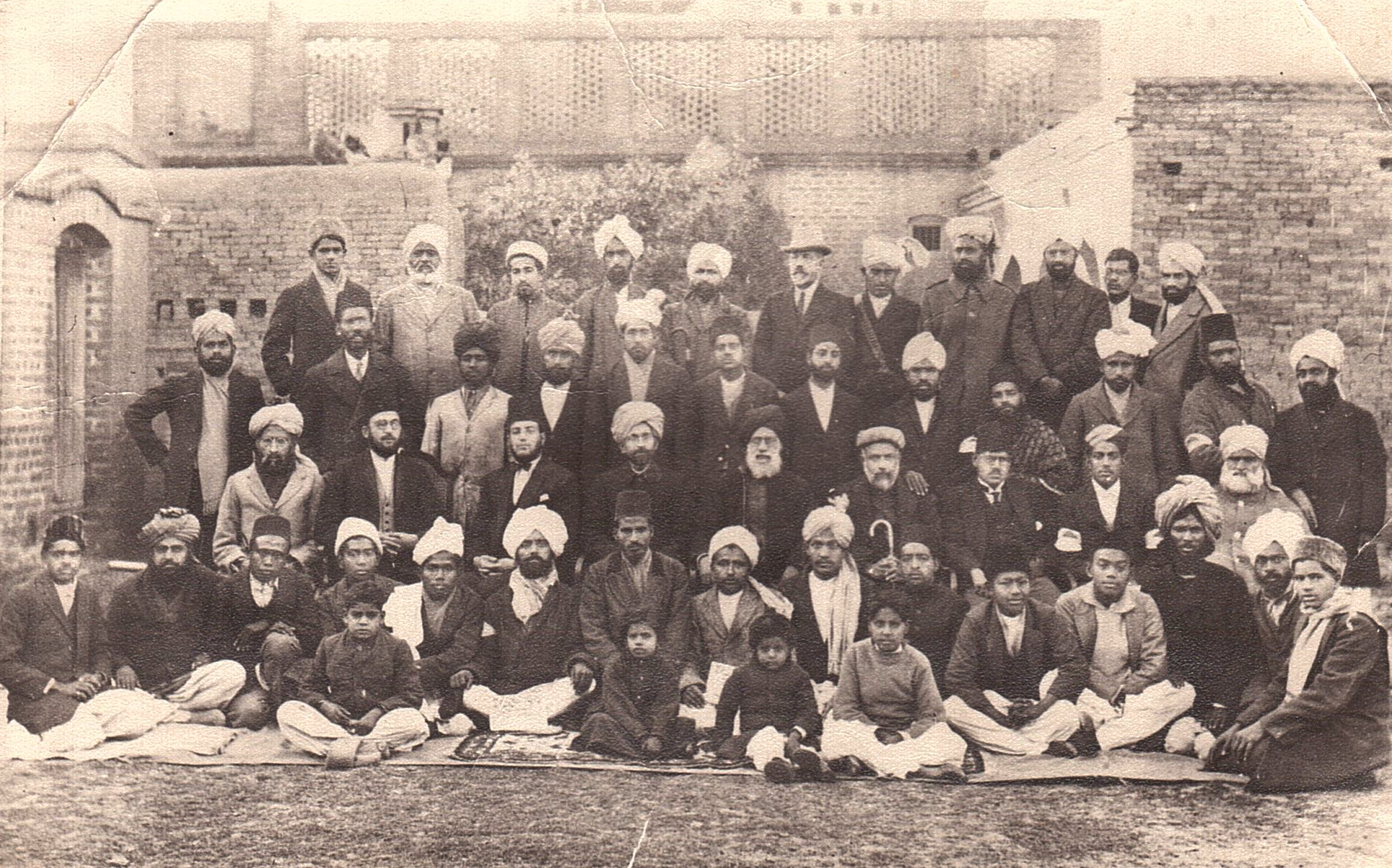
Members of the Ahmadiyya Muslim Community in Qadian

By 2016, the community had been established in 209 countries and territories of the world with concentrations in South Asia, West Africa, East Africa, and Indonesia. The community is a minority Muslim sect in almost every country of the world. In some countries like Pakistan, it is practically illegal to be an Ahmadi Muslim. These factors make it difficult to estimate the world Ahmadiyya population. The community gives a figure of "tens of millions"; independent sources give estimates between 10 and 20 million worldwide, representing around 0.6-1.3% of the world's Muslim population. In 2001, the World Christian Encyclopedia estimated that the Ahmadiyya movement was the fastest growing group within Islam. Pakistan officially claims that it is home to just 290,000 Ahmadis, however, Pakistani Ahmadis have boycotted the census since 1974. Independent estimates set the Pakistani Ahmadiyya population to be somewhere between 2 million and 5 million Ahmadis, with 4 million being the most quoted figure, representing around 2.2% of the population. Estimates of the number of Ahmadis in India also vary widely, from 60,000 to 1 million. A minority of Ahmadis belong to the Lahore Ahmadiyya Movement, which has unofficially claimed 30,000 adherents, including between 5,000 and 10,000 in Pakistan.

== Organisational structure ==
=== The Caliph ===
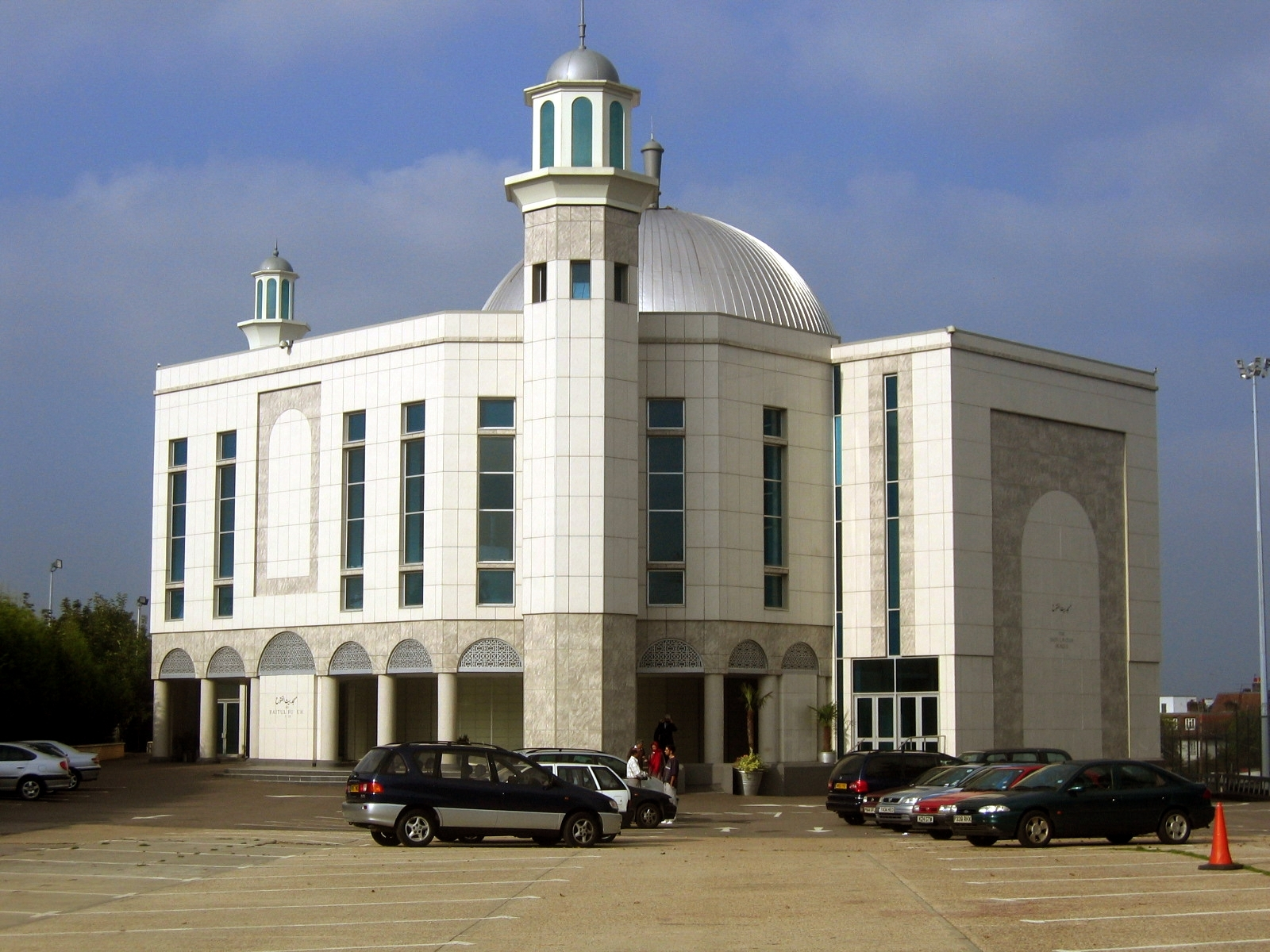
Baitul Futuh Mosque, one of the largest mosques in Europe

Ahmadi Muslims believe that the Ahmadiyya caliphate is the resumption of the Rightly Guided Caliphate. This is believed to have been re-established with the appearance of Mirza Ghulam Ahmad whom Ahmadis believe was the promised Messiah and Mahdi. Ahmadi Muslims maintain that in accordance with Quranic verses and numerous hadith on the issue, the Caliphate (Khilāfah) can only be established by God Himself and is a divine blessing given to those who believe and work righteousness and uphold the unity of God. Therefore, any movement to establish the Caliphate centred around human endeavours alone is bound to fail, particularly when the condition of the people diverges from the precepts of prophethood and they are as a result disunited, their inability to elect a caliph caused fundamentally by the lack of righteousness in them. It is believed that through visions, dreams and spiritual guidance, God instils into the hearts and minds of the believers of whom to elect. No campaigning, speeches or speculation of any kind are permitted. Thus the caliph is designated neither necessarily by right (i.e. the rightful or competent one in the eyes of the people) nor merely by election but primarily by God.

According to Ahmadiyya thought, it is not essential for a caliph to be the head of a state, rather the spiritual and religious significance of the Caliphate is emphasised. It is above all a spiritual office, with the purpose to uphold, strengthen, spread the teachings of Islam and maintain the high spiritual and moral standards within the global community established by Muhammad. If a caliph does happen to bear governmental authority as a head of state, it is incidental and subsidiary in relation to his overall function as a caliph. The caliph is also referred to by Ahmadi Muslims as Amir al-Mu'minin (Leader of the Faithful). The current and fifth caliph is Mirza Masroor Ahmad.

=== The Consultative Council ===
The Majlis-ash-Shura (Consultative Council), in terms of importance, is the highest ranking institution within the Community after the Caliphate. It was established in 1922 by the second caliph, Mirza Basheer-ud-Din Mahmood Ahmad. This advisory body meets formally at least once a year. At the international level, the council is presided over by the caliph. Its main purpose is to advise the caliph on important matters such as finance, projects, education and other issues relating to members of the Community. It is required for the caliph to carry out his duties through consultation, taking into consideration the views of the members of the council. However, it is not incumbent upon him to always accept the views and recommendations of the members. The caliph may comment, issue instructions, announce his decisions on the proposals during the course of the proceedings or may postpone the matter under further reflection. However, in most cases the caliph accepts the advice given by the majority. At the national level, the council is presided over by the ʾAmīr (national president). At the conclusion of the proceedings, the recommendations are sent to the caliph for approval which he may accept, reject or partially accept.

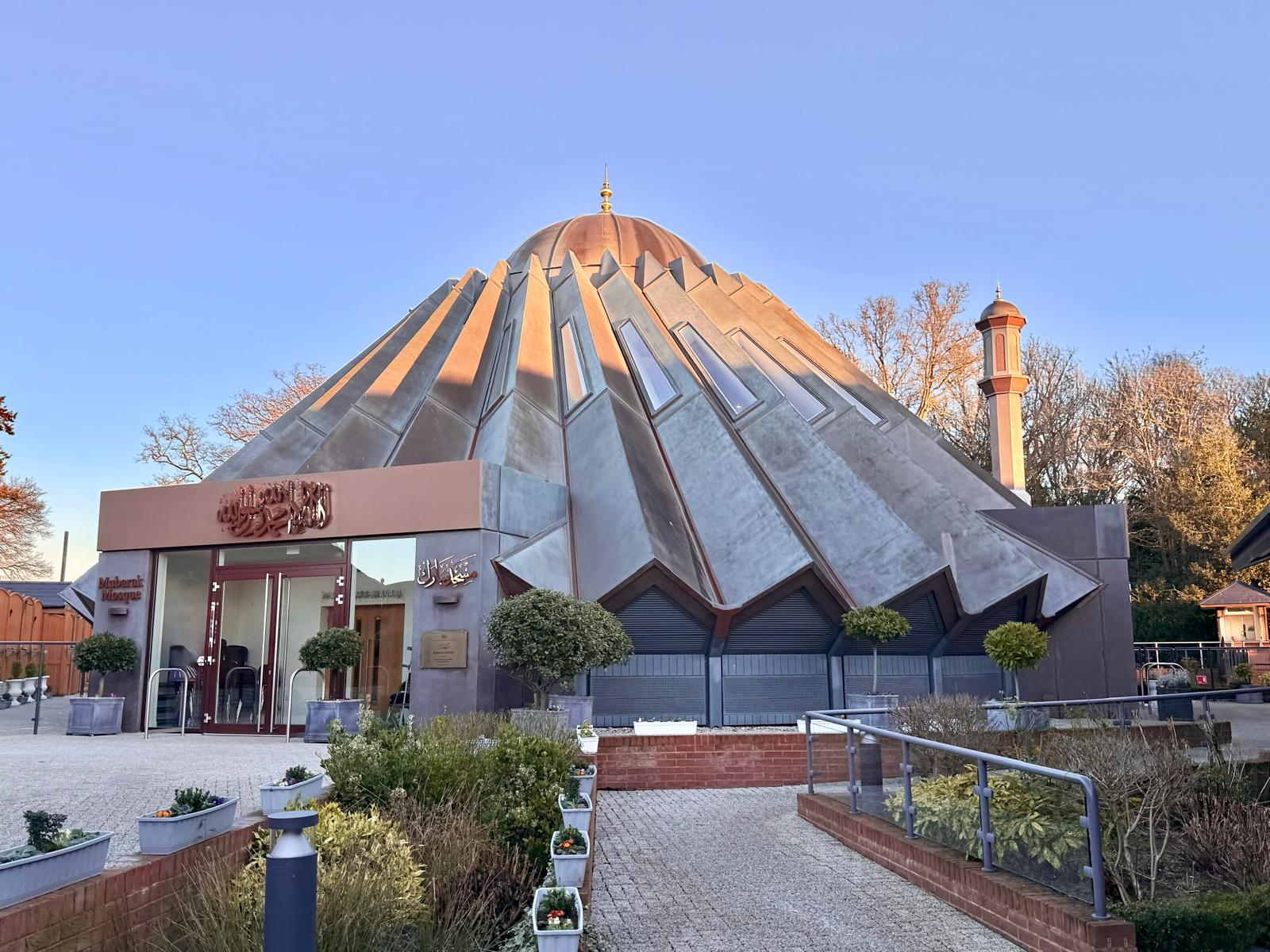
The Mubarak Mosque in Islamabad, Tilford – the current headquarters of the movement

=== The Headquarters ===
The principal headquarters of the Ahmadiyya Muslim Community is the city, town or place where the caliph resides. As such, since the forced exile of the fourth caliph from Pakistan in 1984, the de facto headquarters of the Community had been based at the Fazl Mosque in London, England. In 2019, the fifth caliph moved the headquarters to Islamabad, Tilford, England on land bought by the Community in 1985. Although the Islamic holy cities of Mecca and Medina are acknowledged to be more sacred, Qadian is considered to be the spiritual headquarters of the Community It is believed, and prophesied, that in the future, the Ahmadiyya Caliphate will once again return to Qadian, the birthplace of Mirza Ghulam Ahmad. However, the Ahmadiyya city of Rabwah in Pakistan, since its founding on 20 September 1948 by the second caliph, after the Indian partition, coordinates the majority of the organisation's activity around the world. In particular, the city is responsible for, but not exclusively, the two central bodies of the Community; Central Ahmadiyya Council and the council for 'The New Scheme'. Another, but much smaller body, the council for 'New Dedication', is also active. All central bodies work under the directive of the caliph.

The Sadr Anjuman Ahmadiyya (Central Ahmadiyya Council), first set up by Mirza Ghulam Ahmad in 1906, is today responsible for organising the Community activities in India, Pakistan and Bangladesh; whereas the Anjuman Tehrik-i-Jadid (the council for 'The New Scheme'), first set up by the second caliph, is responsible for missions outside the Indian subcontinent. Each council is further divided into directorates, such as the Department of Financial Affairs, the Department of Publications, the Department of Education, the Department of External Affairs, and the Department of Foreign Missions, among others. Under the latter council, the Community has built over 15,000 mosques, over 500 schools, over 30 hospitals and translated the Quran into over 70 languages. The Anjuman Waqf-i-Jadid (the council for 'The New Dedication'), also initiated by the second caliph, is responsible for training and coordinating religious teachers in rural communities around the world.

=== Institutions ===
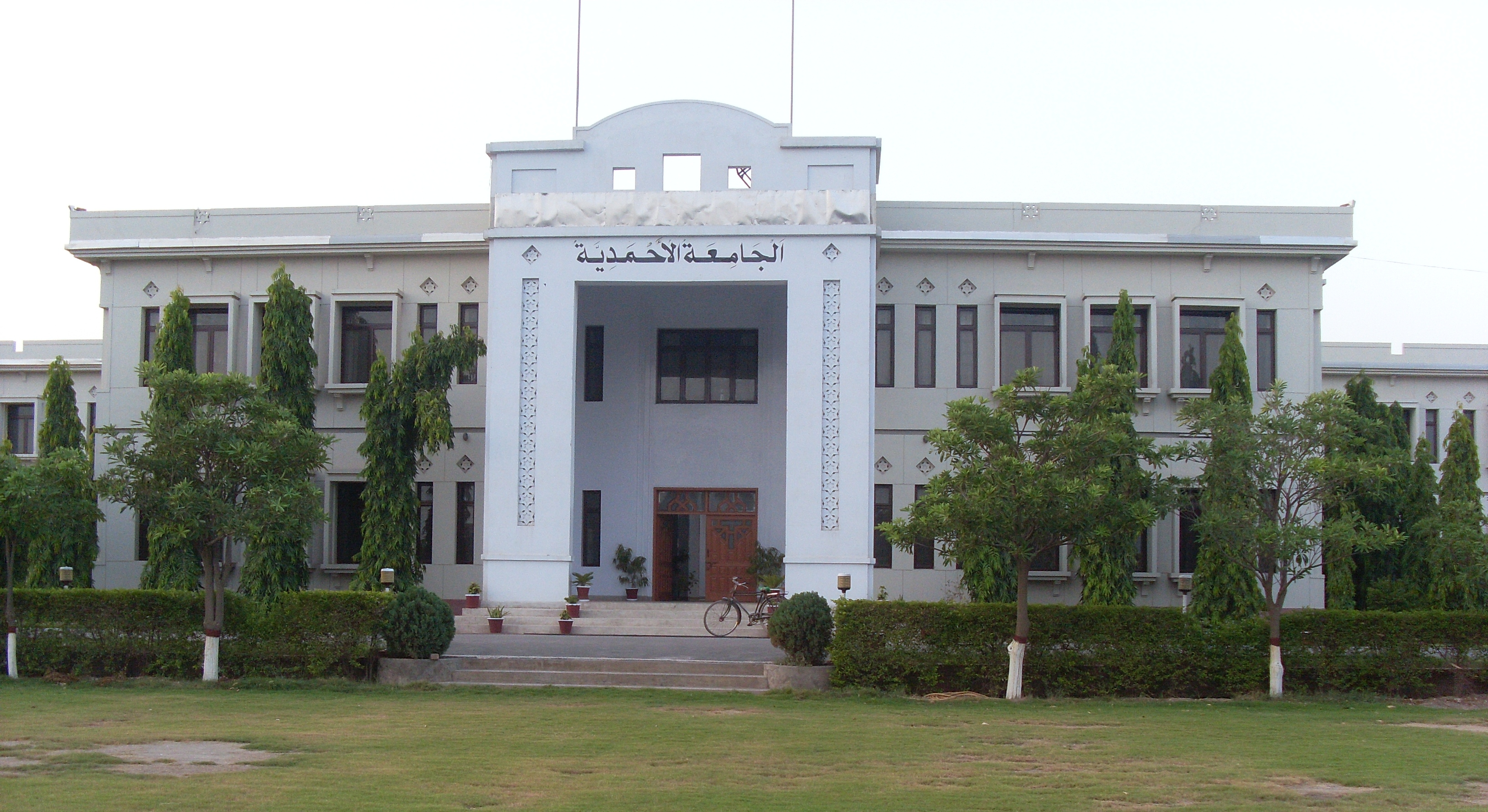
Pakistani campus of the Ahmadiyya University in Rabwah

Of all religious institutions of the Ahmadiyya Muslim Community, Jāmi’ah al-Ahmadīyya, sometimes translated as Ahmadiyya University of Theology and Languages, is particularly notable. It is an international Islamic seminary and educational institute with several campuses throughout Africa, Asia, Europe, and North America. Founded in 1906 as a section in Madrassa Talim ul Islam (later Talim-ul-Islam College) by Mirza Ghulam Ahmad, it is the main centre of the Ahmadiyya Muslim Community for Islamic learning and the training of missionaries. Graduates may be appointed by the Caliph either as missionaries of the Community (often called Murrabi, Imam, or Mawlana) or as Qadis or Muftis of the Community with a specialisation in matters of fiqh (Islamic Jurisprudence). Some Jamia alumni have also become Islamic historians. As of 2008, there are over 1,300 graduates of the university working as missionaries throughout the world.

=== Auxiliary organisations ===
There are five organisations auxiliary to the Ahmadiyya Muslim Community. Each organisation is responsible for the spiritual and moral training of their members. The Lajna Ima’illah is the largest of all the organisations and consists of female members above the age of 15; Majlis Khuddamul Ahmadiyya is for male members between the ages of 15 and 40; Majlis Ansarullah is for male members above the age of 40; Nasiratul Ahmadiyya is for girls between the ages of 7 and 15; and Atfalul Ahmadiyya is for boys between the ages of 7 and 15.

=== The Community ===
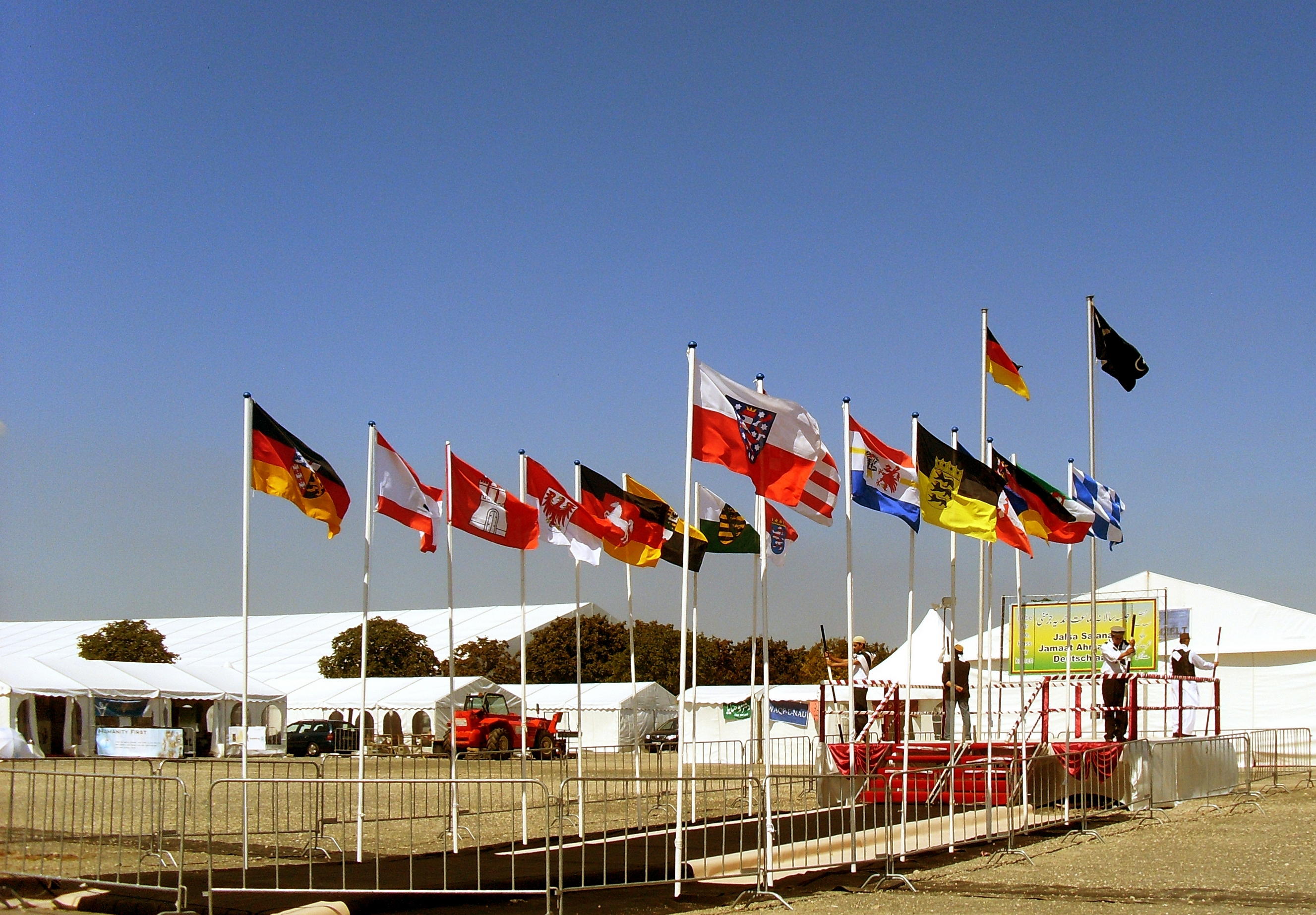
The Ahmadiyya Flag and the flags of German states at the 2009 German Annual Convention

The International Ahmadiyya Muslim Community is divided into National Communities, each with its National Headquarters. Each National Community is further divided into Regional Communities, which is again partitioned into Local Communities. In many cases, each Local Community will have its own mosque, centre or a mission house. The national president, called Amīr, though overseen by the central bodies of the Community, directs the National Amila or the National Executive Body which consists of national secretaries such as the general secretary, secretary for finance, secretary for preaching, secretary for moral training, and secretary for education, among others. This layout is replicated at regional and local levels with each of their own president and executive bodies.

=== Annual events ===
Unlike the Muslim holidays of Eid al-Fitr and Eid al-Adha also celebrated by Ahmadi Muslims, there are several functions observed by Ahmadis though not regarded as religious holidays. As such, functions are not considered equally obligatory nor is it necessary to celebrate them on the day normally set for celebration. The most important religious function of the Community is Jalsa Salana or the Annual Convention, first initiated by Mirza Ghulam Ahmad, is the formal annual gathering of the Community, for the purpose of increasing one's religious knowledge and the promotion of harmony, friendship, and solidarity within members of the Community. Other functions include "Life of the Holy Prophet Day", "Promised Messiah Day", "Promised Reformer Day" and "Caliphate Day".

== Persecution ==
Ahmadi have been viewed as infidels and heretics by some, and the movement has faced at times violent opposition. In 1973, the Organisation of Islamic Cooperation officially declared that the Ahmadiyya was not linked to Islam. In Pakistan, Ahmadis have been officially declared as non-Muslims by the Government of Pakistan and the term Qādiānī is often used pejoratively to refer to them and is also used in Pakistani documents.

Ahmadis have been subject to religious persecution and discrimination since the movement's inception in 1889.

== See also ==
- Islamic schools and branches
- List of Ahmadis
- List of Ahmadiyya buildings and structures
- Muslim Television Ahmadiyya International
- Ahmadiyya hospitals
- New religious movement
