= Ahmadiyya by country =

Ahmadiyya is an Islamic religious movement originating in 1889 in northern India around the teachings of Mirza Ghulam Ahmad (1835–1908), who claimed to have been divinely appointed as both the promised Mahdi and Messiah expected by Muslims to appear towards the end times.

As of 2016 the Community has been established in 209 countries and territories of the world. (Note: Depending on the definition, there are 195 or 196 countries in the world, of which 193 are member states of the United Nations. Under the constitutive theory of statehood there are 206 sovereign states. There are dozens of territories and colonies that are sometimes erroneously called "countries". See: "The Number of Countries in the World". Archived from the original on September 23, 2014.) with concentrations in South Asia, West Africa, East Africa and Indonesia. The Community is a minority Muslim group in almost every country of the world. On the other hand, it has spread to most countries of the world. In some countries, it is practically illegal to be an Ahmadi Muslim. For instance, in Pakistan, following Ordinance XX, Ahmadis cannot call themselves Muslims, profess the Islamic creed publicly or call their places of worship mosques. The religious slur "Qadiani" has been used against Ahmadi Muslims and the community has also been persecuted. Together, these factors make it difficult to estimate the Ahmadiyya population for both the Community itself and as well as independent organizations. For this reason, the Community gives a figure of "tens of millions"; however, most independent sources variously estimate the population to be at least 10 to 20 million worldwide, thereby representing around 1% of the world's Muslim population. (Note: A figure of 10 to 20 million represents 0.62% to 1.25% of the world's Muslim population.)

According to the World Christian Encyclopedia, the Ahmadiyya movement is the fastest growing Islamic group as of the early 21st century. (Note: The Ahmadiyya Movement has been the fastest growing Islamic group according to the World Christian Encyclopedia for a number of decades. For this, see earlier editions. The 2001 edition places the growth rate at 3.25%, which is the highest of all Islamic sects and schools of thought. See: David B. Barrett; George Thomas Kurian; Todd M. Johnson, eds. (February 15, 2001). World Christian Encyclopedia. Oxford University Press USA. ISBN 0195079639.) The country with the largest Ahmadiyya population is Pakistan, with an estimated 4 million Ahmadi Muslims. Excluding small nations, the country with the largest proportion of Ahmadi Muslims to the wider Muslim population is Ghana, standing at 16%. The country with the highest percentage of the overall population is Sierra Leone standing at over 8%.

The population is almost entirely contained in the single, organized and united movement, commonly referred to as the Ahmadiyya Muslim Community (AMC), headed by the Khalifa. The other is the Lahore Ahmadiyya Movement, a separatist group which, though historically significant, has failed to attract a sizeable following representing less than 0.2% of the total Ahmadiyya population. (Note: The Lahore Ahmadiyya Movement has unofficially stated its total population to be up to 30,000, of which 5,000 to 10,000 live in Pakistan. On this basis, the Lahore Ahmadiyya Movement represents approximately 0.2% of the total Ahmadiyya population.See: Simon Ross Valentine (2008-10-06). Islam and the Ahmadiyya Jamaʻat: History, Belief, Practice. Columbia University Press. p. 61. ISBN 978-0-231-70094-8.; "Pakistan: Situation of members of the Lahori Ahmadiyya Movement in Pakistan".)

== Countries ==
=== Maps ===
The following maps summarize the data presented in the table below.

World Ahmadi Muslim population. (Sources are various. See table below.)

World Ahmadi Muslims as a percentage of Muslims. (Sources are various. See table below.)

=== Table ===
The following figures display estimates of the number of Ahmadi Muslims and their percentages by country. However, it does not list all the countries with the Ahmadiyya presence.

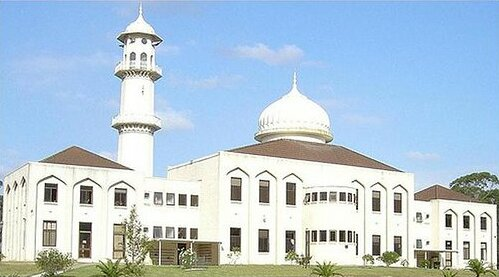
Baitul Huda Mosque, Sydney, Australia

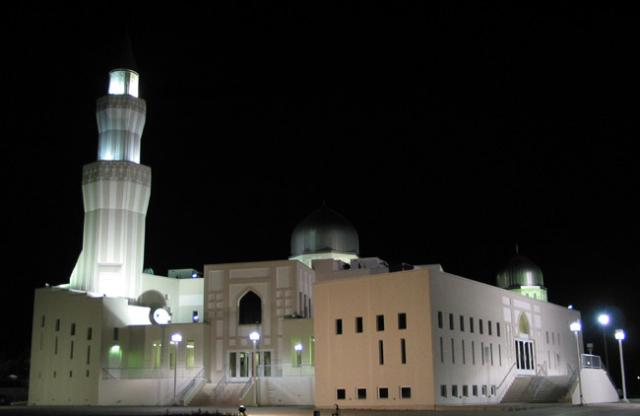
Baitul Islam mosque, Vaughan, Ontario, Canada

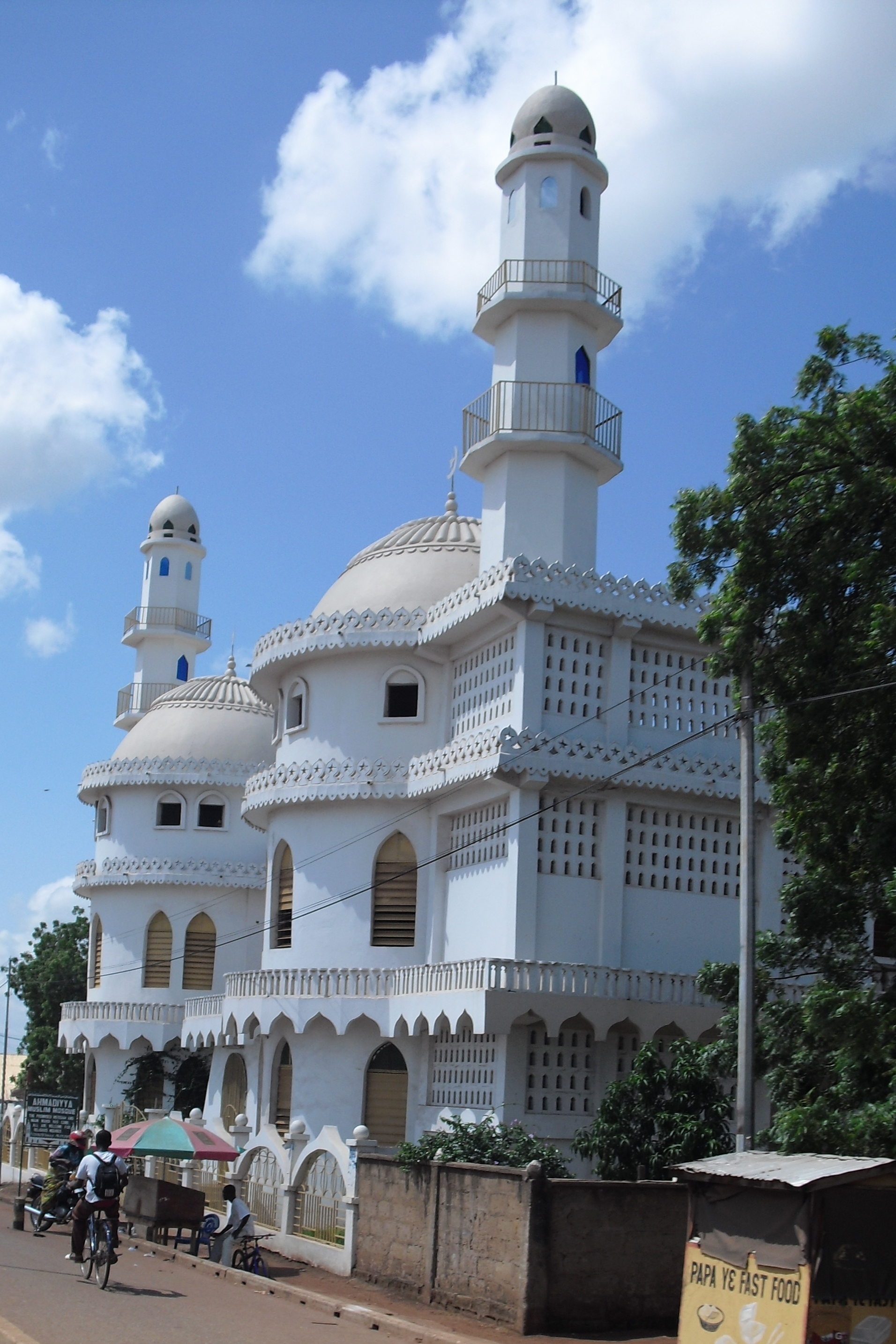
Ahmadiyya Central mosque, Tamale, Ghana

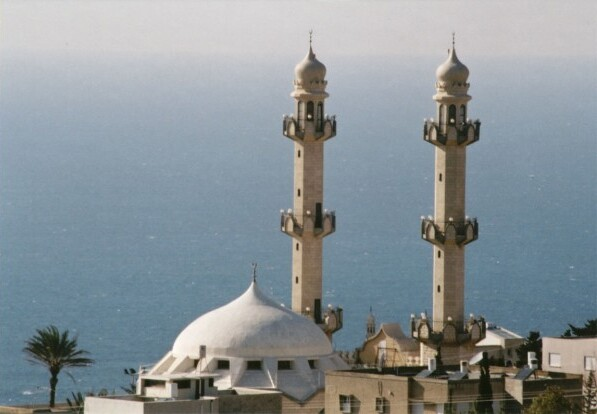
Mahmood mosque, Haifa, Israel, overlooking the Mediterranean Sea

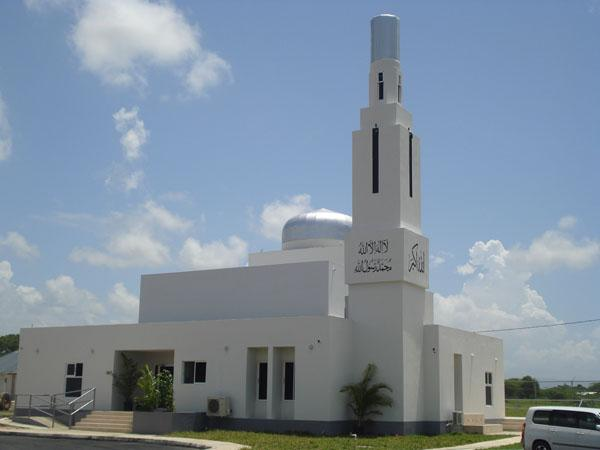
Mahdi Mosque, Old Harbour, Jamaica

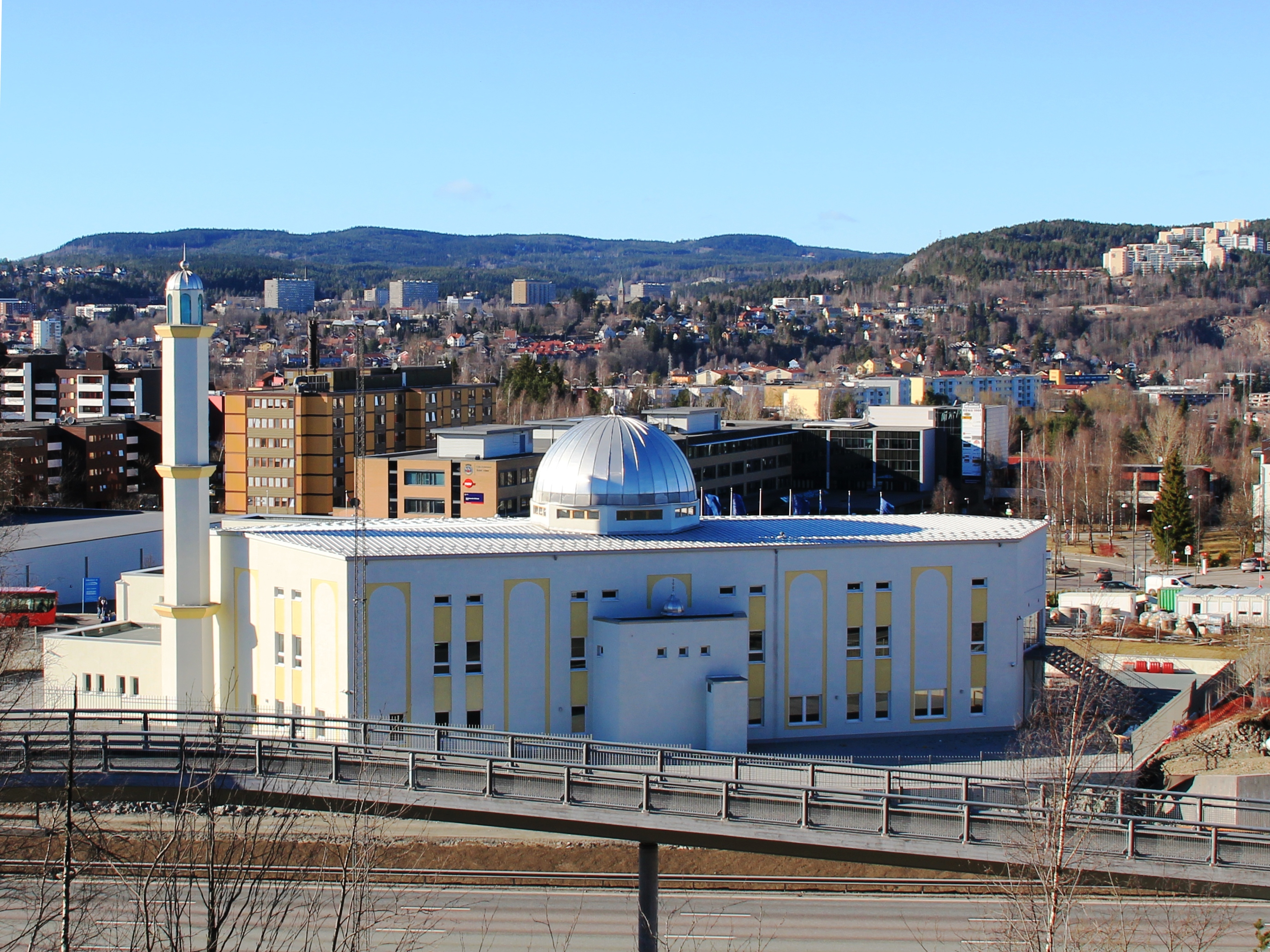
Baitul Nasr Mosque, Oslo, Norway

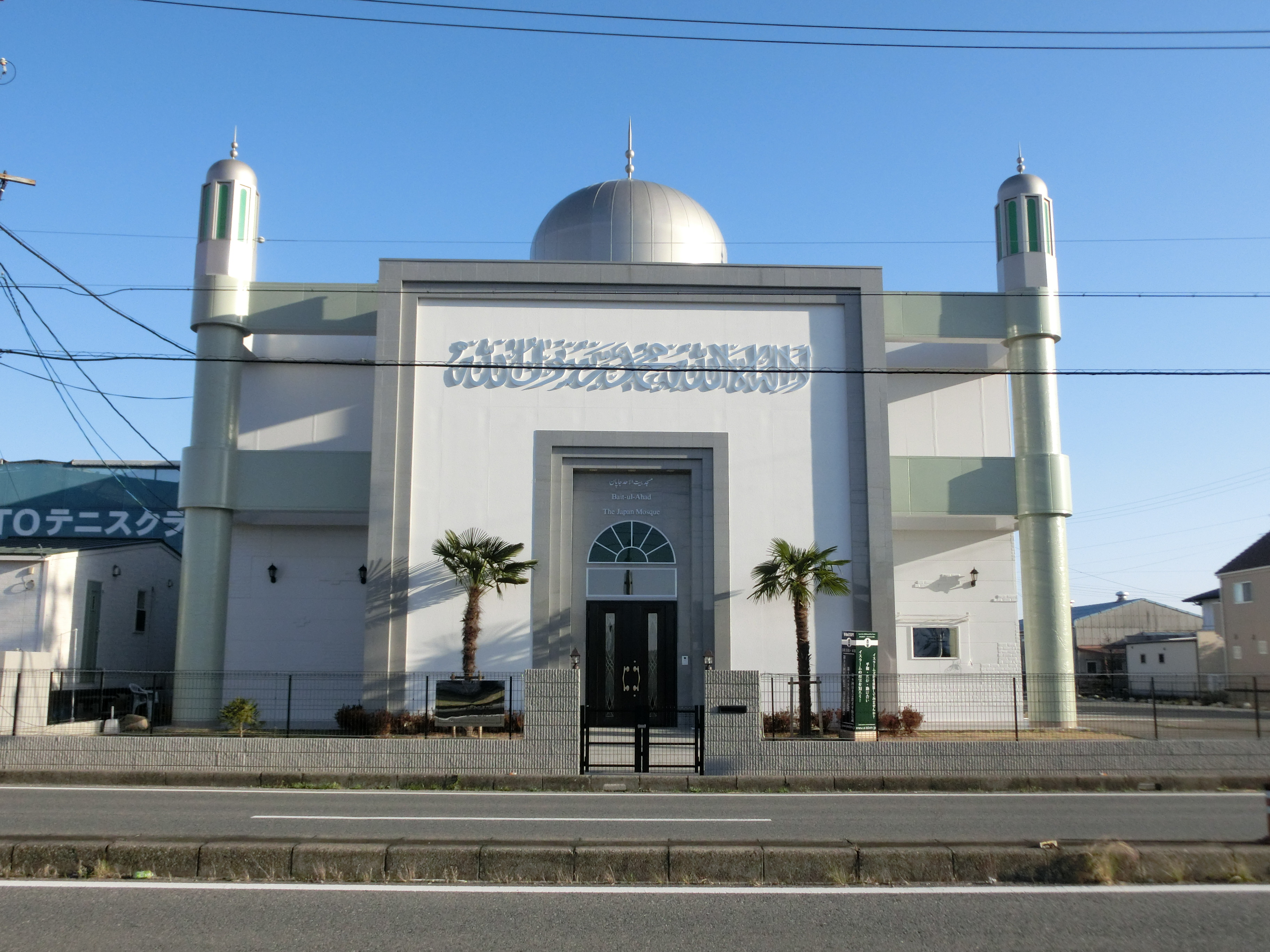
Baitul Ahad - The Japan Mosque, Tsushima, Japan

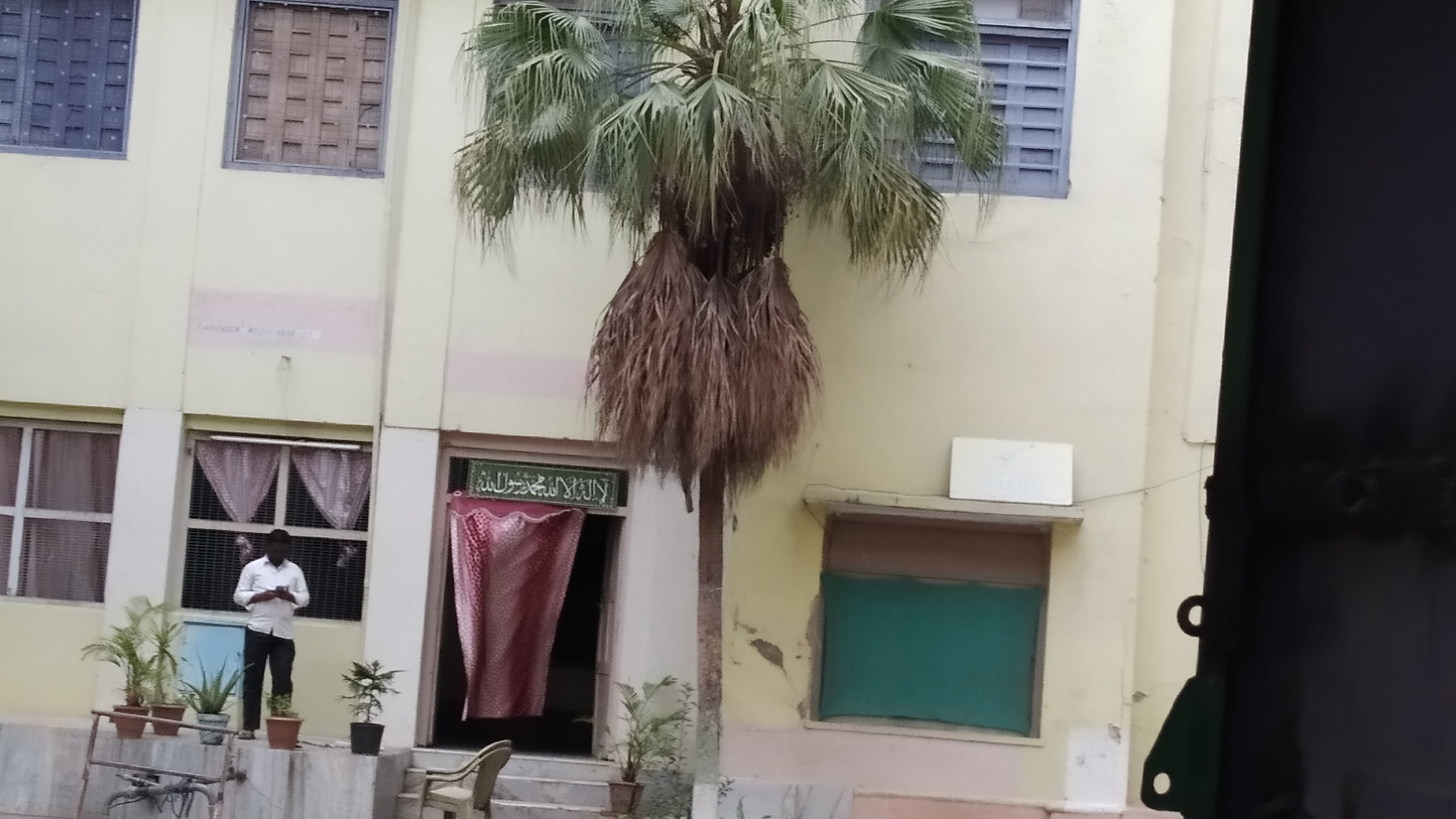
Ahmadiyya Mosque, Barkatpura, India

Country/Region	Ahmadiyya population	Percentage (%) of Muslims	Percentage (%) of population	Notes/ Sources
Algeria (details)	2,000	< 0.1	< 0.1	Estimate
Argentina (details)	15,500	2.0	< 0.1	Estimate
Australia (details)	3,000	0.8	< 0.1	Estimate
Austria (details)	300	0.1	< 0.1	Estimate
Bangladesh (details)	100,000	0.1	0.1	Estimate (Note: There is also an upper estimate of 200,000 Ahmadi Muslims in Bangladesh.)
Belarus (details)	30	0.2	< 0.1	Estimate
Belgium (details)	1,250	0.2	< 0.1	Estimate
Belize (details)	50	1.8	< 0.1	Estimate
Brazil (details)	20	0.1	< 0.1	Estimate
Bulgaria (details)	400	< 0.1	< 0.1	Estimate
Cameroon (details)	430,000	12.0	2.2	PRC
Canada (details)	25,000	2.5	0.1	Estimate
Chad (details)	220,000	4.0	2.0	PRC
(Democratic Republic of the Congo) Congo (details)	540,000	6.0	0.7	PRC
Denmark (details)	600	0.3	< 0.1	Estimate
Egypt (details)	50,000	0.1	< 0.1	Estimate
Fiji (details)	2,000	3.6	0.3	1996 Census (Note: The actual figure as stated in the 1996 census is 1,976.)
France (details)	30,000	0.9	< 0.1	Estimate
Gambia (details)	50,000	2.0	2.0	Estimate
Germany (details)	45,000	0.9	< 0.1	Estimate
Ghana (details)	635,000	16.0	2.5	PRC (Note: Ghana's Muslims have previously raised concern over the census figures which states that 17% of Ghanaians belong to the Muslim faith. It is claimed that Muslims represent somewhere between 30 and 45% of Ghana. Under this, the Ahmadiyya population would number almost 2 million. The Ahmadiyya Muslim Community itself gives an estimate of over 2 million Ahmadis in Ghana. See: "Muslims cry foul over population figures". News From Africa. Archived from the original on May 2, 2014.; Ahmadiyya Muslim Mosques Around the World – A Pictorical Presentation. Ahmadiyya Muslim Community; Khilafat Centenary Edition. 2008. p. 70. ISBN 978-1882494514.)
Guatemala (details)	1,000	10	< 0.1	Estimate
Guinea Bissau (details)	13,000	2.0	0.8	PRC
Guyana (details)	200*	0.4	< 0.1	Estimate (Note: There are over 200 members of the Ahmadiyya Muslim Community in Guyana. However, the Lahore Ahmadiyya movement is also active in Guyana, for which figures are unavailable at the moment. Thus, a figure of 200 is unlikely to be representative of the total Ahmadiyya population. See: "Facing Persecution in Pakistan….Ahmadiyya Muslim Community finds sanctuary in Guyana". February 2, 2014.)
India (details)	1,000,000	0.6	< 0.1	Estimate
Indonesia (details)	400,000	0.2	0.2	ARDA
Ireland (details)	500	1.2	< 0.1	Estimate
Israel (details)	2,200	0.2	< 0.1	Estimate
Italy (details)	500	< 0.1	< 0.1	Estimate
Jamaica (details)	100	2.0	< 0.1	Estimate
Japan (details)	300	0.3	< 0.1	Estimate
Kazakhstan (details)	500	< 0.1	< 0.1	Estimate
Kenya (details)	198,000	4.0	0.3	PRC
Kyrgyzstan (details)	1,000	< 0.1	< 0.1	Estimate
Lesotho (details)	350	35.0	< 0.1	AMC
Liberia (details)	85,000	10.0	1.2	PRC
Malaysia (details)	2,000	< 0.1	< 0.1	Estimate
Mali (details)	260,000	2.0	1.6	PRC
Marshall Islands (details)	10	100.0	< 0.1	Estimate
Mauritius (details)	4,000	1.9	0.3	Estimate
Mexico (details)	100	2.7	< 0.1	Esitimate
Morocco (details)	500	< 0.1	< 0.1	Esitimate
Netherlands (details)	1,500	0.2	< 0.1	Estimate
New Zealand (details)	400	1.0	< 0.1	Estimate
Niger (details)	970,000	6.0	5.5	PRC
Nigeria (details)	2,840,000	3.0	1.3	PRC
Norway (details)	1,600	1.0	< 0.1	Estimate
Pakistan (details)	600,000 – 4,900,000	0.3 – 2.2	0.3 – 2.2	Various estimates (Note: The 1998 Pakistani census states that there are 291,000 (0.22%) Ahmadis in Pakistan. However, the Ahmadiyya Muslim Community has boycotted the census since 1974 which renders official Pakistani figures to be inaccurate. Independent groups have estimated the Pakistani Ahmadiyya population to be somewhere between 2 million and 4 million Ahmadis. However, the 4 million figure is the most quoted figure. See: 600,000: Freedom House. "The Impact of Blasphemy Laws on Human Rights". p. 120.; over 2 million: Immigration and Refugee Board of Canada (2008-12-04). "Pakistan: The situation of Ahmadis, including legal status and political, education and employment rights; societal attitudes toward Ahmadis (2006 – Nov. 2008)".; 3 million: International Federation for Human Rights: International Fact-Finding Mission. Freedoms of Expression, of Association and of Assembly in Pakistan. Ausgabe 408/2, Januar 2005, S. 61 (PDF); 3–4 million: Commission on International Religious Freedom: Annual Report of the United States Commission on International Religious Freedom. 2005, S. 130; "Pakistan: Situation of members of the Lahori Ahmadiyya Movement in Pakistan".)
Poland (details)	38	0.2	< 0.1	Estimate
Russia (details)	50	< 0.1	< 0.1	Estimate
Senegal (details)	116,000	1.0	0.9	PRC
Sierra Leone (details)	500,000	12.0	8.1	AMC
Singapore (details)	200	< 0.1	< 0.1	1970s Estimate
Solomon Islands (details)	1,000	50.0	0.2	Estimate (Note: It is estimated that there are 1,000 Ahmadis in the country. However, Sunni Muslims claim to have more followers in the country. Taking a lower bound, it can be stipulated that Ahmadis represent 50% of the country's Muslims. See: Flower, Scott (September 2008). "Muslims in Melanesia: putting security issues in perspective". Australian Journal of International Affairs. 62 (3). Taylor & Francis: 408–429. doi:10.1080/10357710802286841. S2CID 153502801.)
Spain (details)	500	< 0.1	< 0.1	Estimate
Suriname (details)	14,000	18.9	2.6	2012 Census (Note: The exact figure as stated in the 2012 census is 14,161)
Swaziland (details)	250	12.5	< 0.1	AMC
Sweden (details)	800	0.2	< 0.1	Estimate. (Note: Estimates range from 500 to 1,100. See: Lewis, James R. (2015). Handbook of Nordic New Religions. Brill. p. 362. ISBN 9789004292468.)
Switzerland (details)	800	0.2	< 0.1	Estimate
Tanzania (details)	2,540,000	15.0	4.5	PRC
Thailand (details)	300	< 0.1	< 0.1	AMC Estimate
Trinidad and Tobago (details)	500*	0.7	< 0.1	Estimate (Note: There are over 500 members of the Ahmadiyya Muslim Community. However, there is also a large presence of the Lahore Ahmadiyya movement, for which figures are unavailable. Thus, a figure of 500 is unlikely to be representative of the total Ahmadiyya population. See: Taylor, Patrick; Case, Frederick I. (30 April 2013). "The Encyclopedia of Caribbean Religions: Volume 1: A - L; Volume 2: M - Z". The Encyclopedia of Caribbean Religions: Volume 1: A-L; Volume 2: M-Z. pp. 33–38. ISBN 9780252094330.)
Tuvalu (details)	50	100.0	0.5	2005 Estimate
Uganda (details)	192,000	4.0	0.5	PRC
United Kingdom (details)	30,000	1.0	< 0.1	Estimate
United States (details)	15,000	0.6	< 0.1	Estimate
Zambia (details)	500	0.8	< 0.1	Estimate

== See also ==
Islam:

- Islam by country
- Shia Muslims in the Arab world

Other religions:

- Baháʼí Faith by country
- Buddhism by country
- Christianity by country
- Hinduism by country
- Judaism by country
- Sikhism by country
