= List of protected heritage sites in Alken, Belgium =

This table shows an overview of the protected heritage sites in the Flemish town Alken, Belgium. This list is part of Belgium's national heritage.

| Object | Status^{?} | Year/architect | Town/section | Address | Coordinates | Number^{?} | Image |
|---|---|---|---|---|---|---|---|
| Farmhouse with separate components ^{(nl)} ^{(fr)} | | | Alken | Alkerstraat 62 | 50.87198°N 5.32024°E | 31633 Info | |
| Farmhouse with separate components ^{(nl)} ^{(fr)} | | | Alken | Blekkenbergstraat 37 | 50.90627°N 5.27401°E | 31635 Info | |
| Castle Brandepoel ^{(nl)} ^{(fr)} | | | Alken | Brandepoelstraat 37 | 50.87012°N 5.24547°E | 31636 Info | |
| Castle Brandepoel ^{(nl)} ^{(fr)} | | | Alken | Brandepoelstraat 38 | 50.87012°N 5.24547°E | 31636 Info | |
| Farm Brandepoel ^{(nl)} ^{(fr)} | | | Alken | Brandepoelstraat 23 | 50.86779°N 5.24687°E | 31637 Info | |
| Residential farm ^{(nl)} ^{(fr)} | Ja | | Alken | Bulsstraat 12 | 50.87702°N 5.34573°E | 31638 Info | |
| Farm ^{(nl)} ^{(fr)} | | | Alken | Bulsstraat 85 | 50.87149°N 5.34957°E | 31639 Info | |
| Closed farm ^{(nl)} ^{(fr)} | Ja | | Alken | Bulsstraat 59 | 50.87412°N 5.34878°E | 31640 Info | |
| Farm Timmersmans ^{(nl)} ^{(fr)} | Ja | | Alken | Bulsstraat 116 | 50.86737°N 5.35007°E | 31641 Info | |
| Farmhouse ^{(nl)} ^{(fr)} | | | Alken | Doktoorstraat 1 | 50.87402°N 5.30400°E | 31642 Info | |
| House ^{(nl)} ^{(fr)} | | | Alken | Dorpsstraat 2 | 50.87649°N 5.30718°E | 31643 Info | |
| Chapel of 1962 ^{(nl)} ^{(fr)} | | | Alken | Grootstraat | 50.88041°N 5.33714°E | 31644 Info | |
| Farmhouse with separate components ^{(nl)} ^{(fr)} | | | Alken | Grootstraat 90 | 50.87895°N 5.32410°E | 31645 Info | |
| House ^{(nl)} ^{(fr)} | Ja | | Alken | Grootstraat 102 | 50.87917°N 5.32550°E | 31646 Info | |
| Semi-closed farm ^{(nl)} ^{(fr)} | Ja | | Alken | Grootstraat 114 | 50.87946°N 5.32739°E | 31647 Info | |
| Closed farm ^{(nl)} ^{(fr)} | Ja | | Alken | Grootstraat 133 | 50.88002°N 5.32864°E | 31649 Info | |
| Remains of a long farm complex ^{(nl)} ^{(fr)} | | | Alken | Grootstraat 194 | 50.88029°N 5.33887°E | 31650 Info | |
| Castle of Corswarem ^{(nl)} ^{(fr)} | | | Alken | Hameestraat 65 | 50.86772°N 5.30056°E | 31651 Info | |
| Long stretch of farm ^{(nl)} ^{(fr)} | Ja | | Alken | Heiligenbornstraat 47 | 50.87381°N 5.25117°E | 31652 Info | |
| St. George's Chapel ^{(nl)} ^{(fr)} | Ja | | Alken | Hemelsveldstraat | 50.86815°N 5.27574°E | 31653 Info | |
| Semi-closed farm ^{(nl)} ^{(fr)} | Ja | | Alken | Hemelsveldstraat 72 | 50.86710°N 5.27291°E | 31654 Info | |
| Farmhouse with separate components ^{(nl)} ^{(fr)} | | | Alken | Hendrikstraat 66 | 50.87505°N 5.27743°E | 31655 Info | |
| Closed farm ^{(nl)} ^{(fr)} | Ja | | Alken | Hendrikstraat 93 | 50.87628°N 5.27387°E | 31656 Info | |
| Farmhouse with separate components ^{(nl)} ^{(fr)} | Ja | | Alken | Hendrikstraat 104 | 50.87751°N 5.27305°E | 31657 Info | |
| Farm Rodenhof ^{(nl)} ^{(fr)} | | | Alken | Hendrikstraat 129 | 50.87789°N 5.27077°E | 31658 Info | |
| Parish Church St. Aldegondis ^{(nl)} ^{(fr)} | Ja | | Alken | Hoogdorpsstraat | 50.87554°N 5.30736°E | 31659 Info | |
| section house ^{(nl)} ^{(fr)} | | | Alken | Hoogdorpsstraat 38 | 50.87528°N 5.30581°E | 31660 Info | |
| House ^{(nl)} ^{(fr)} | | | Alken | Hoogsimsestraat 2 | 50.86360°N 5.29318°E | 31661 Info | |
| Closed farm ^{(nl)} ^{(fr)} | | | Alken | Hoogsimsestraat 75 | 50.85845°N 5.29718°E | 31662 Info | |
| Restored farmhouse ^{(nl)} ^{(fr)} | | | Alken | Hulzenstraat 140 | 50.87679°N 5.25879°E | 31663 Info | |
| Farmhouse with separate components ^{(nl)} ^{(fr)} | | | Alken | Hulzenveldstraat 21 | 50.87830°N 5.25801°E | 31664 Info | |
| Chapel ^{(nl)} ^{(fr)} | | | Alken | Klameerstraat | 50.85771°N 5.29745°E | 31665 Info | |
| L-shaped farmhouse ^{(nl)} ^{(fr)} | Ja | | Alken | Klameerstraat 20 | 50.86380°N 5.30560°E | 31666 Info | |
| Closed farm ^{(nl)} ^{(fr)} | | | Alken | Klinkstraat 38 | 50.88260°N 5.32756°E | 31667 Info | |
| Farm Diepers ^{(nl)} ^{(fr)} | | | Alken | Klinkstraat 56 | 50.88175°N 5.33150°E | 31668 Info | |
| Closed farm ^{(nl)} ^{(fr)} | | | Alken | Klinkstraat 57 | 50.88226°N 5.33076°E | 31669 Info | |
| Knipscheer Chapel ^{(nl)} ^{(fr)} | Ja | | Alken | Knipscheerstraat | 50.85780°N 5.28673°E | 31670 Info | |
| Farmhouse with separate components ^{(nl)} ^{(fr)} | | | Alken | Knipscheerstraat 87 | 50.85752°N 5.28663°E | 31671 Info | |
| Farm ^{(nl)} ^{(fr)} | Ja | | Alken | Knipscheerstraat 92 | 50.85848°N 5.28683°E | 31672 Info | |
| Corner ^{(nl)} ^{(fr)} | | | Alken | Laagdorp 1 | 50.87575°N 5.30827°E | 31673 Info | |
| Ruin of a road chapel ^{(nl)} ^{(fr)} | | | Alken | Laagsimsestraat | 50.86604°N 5.29093°E | 31674 Info | |
| Closed farm ^{(nl)} ^{(fr)} | | | Alken | Laagsimsestraat 98 | 50.87121°N 5.28855°E | 31675 Info | |
| Guild Hall of 1914 ^{(nl)} ^{(fr)} | | | Alken | Hoogdorpsstraat 5 | 50.87480°N 5.30587°E | 31676 Info | |
| Long stretch of farm ^{(nl)} ^{(fr)} | Ja | | Alken | Leemkuilstraat 101 | 50.87100°N 5.32911°E | 31678 Info | |
| Spleethoeve ^{(nl)} ^{(fr)} | | | Alken | Lindestraat 21 | 50.88408°N 5.27177°E | 31679 Info | |
| Semi-closed farm ^{(nl)} ^{(fr)} | | | Alken | Lindestraat 93 | 50.89225°N 5.26771°E | 31680 Info | |
| Semi-closed farm ^{(nl)} ^{(fr)} | Ja | | Alken | Lindestraat 149 | 50.89706°N 5.26149°E | 31681 Info | |
| U-shaped farm ^{(nl)} ^{(fr)} | | | Alken | Lindestraat 164 | 50.89720°N 5.26383°E | 31682 Info | |
| L-shaped farmhouse ^{(nl)} ^{(fr)} | Ja | | Alken | Lindestraat 195 | 50.90142°N 5.25780°E | 31683 Info | |
| Closed farm of 1886 ^{(nl)} ^{(fr)} | | | Alken | Lindestraat 210 | 50.90100°N 5.25955°E | 31684 Info | |
| Long stretch of farm ^{(nl)} ^{(fr)} | | | Alken | Meerdegatstraat 17 | 50.88051°N 5.31676°E | 31687 Info | |
| House ^{(nl)} ^{(fr)} | | | Alken | Meerdegatstraat 19 | 50.88081°N 5.31661°E | 31688 Info | |
| Closed farm ^{(nl)} ^{(fr)} | Ja | | Alken | Meerdegatstraat 49 | 50.88314°N 5.31507°E | 31689 Info | |
| Long stretch of farm ^{(nl)} ^{(fr)} | Ja | | Alken | Meerdegatstraat 114 | 50.88624°N 5.31048°E | 31690 Info | |
| Closed farm ^{(nl)} ^{(fr)} | Ja | | Alken | Meerdegatstraat 116 | 50.88645°N 5.31005°E | 31691 Info | |
| Farmhouse with separate components ^{(nl)} ^{(fr)} | | | Alken | Meerdegatstraat 138 | 50.88849°N 5.30871°E | 31692 Info | |
| Green Mill ^{(nl)} ^{(fr)} | | | Alken | Meerdegatstraat 155 | 50.89038°N 5.30649°E | 31693 Info | |
| Farmhouse with separate components ^{(nl)} ^{(fr)} | Ja | | Alken | Molenstraat | 50.89639°N 5.29596°E | 31694 Info | |
| Closed farm Black Mining ^{(nl)} ^{(fr)} | | | Alken | Molenstraat 24 | 50.89663°N 5.29787°E | 31695 Info | |
| New Mill ^{(nl)} ^{(fr)} | Ja | | Alken | Molenstraat 58 | 50.90044°N 5.28393°E | 31696 Info | |
| Chapel of Our Lady Hope of Hope Release ^{(nl)} ^{(fr)} | | | Alken | Motstraat | 50.86668°N 5.30934°E | 31697 Info | |
| Corner Building ^{(nl)} ^{(fr)} | | | Alken | Laagdorp 2 | 50.87527°N 5.30814°E | 31698 Info | |
| Long stretch of farm ^{(nl)} ^{(fr)} | | | Alken | Oftingenstraat 11 | 50.88564°N 5.31497°E | 31699 Info | |
| Castle Leva ^{(nl)} ^{(fr)} | Ja | | Alken | O. L. Vrouwstraat 40 | 50.89479°N 5.28103°E | 31700 Info | |
| Motte ^{(nl)} ^{(fr)} | | | Alken | O. L. Vrouwstraat | 50.89306°N 5.27883°E | 31701 Info | |
| Closed farm ^{(nl)} ^{(fr)} | | | Alken | O. L. Vrouwstraat 68 | 50.89500°N 5.27967°E | 31702 Info | |
| Closed farm ^{(nl)} ^{(fr)} | Ja | | Alken | Oude Baan 87 | 50.88503°N 5.28449°E | 31703 Info | |
| Farmhouse Groot-Peteren ^{(nl)} ^{(fr)} | | | Alken | Rechtstraat 61 | 50.87193°N 5.33637°E | 31704 Info | |
| Village house ^{(nl)} ^{(fr)} | Ja | | Alken | Ridderstraat 7 | 50.87559°N 5.30519°E | 31705 Info | |
| House of a large farm ^{(nl)} ^{(fr)} | Ja | | Alken | Ridderstraat 10 | 50.87620°N 5.30498°E | 31706 Info | |
| Long stretch of farm ^{(nl)} ^{(fr)} | | | Alken | Sassenbroekstraat 35 | 50.88343°N 5.32196°E | 31707 Info | |
| Farmhouse with separate components ^{(nl)} ^{(fr)} | | | Alken | Schoenbeekstraat 21 | 50.87046°N 5.34203°E | 31708 Info | |
| Closed farm ^{(nl)} ^{(fr)} | | | Alken | Snoekstraat 24 | 50.86427°N 5.30755°E | 31709 Info | |
| Rectory ^{(nl)} ^{(fr)} | | | Alken | St. Aldegondislaan 1 | 50.87521°N 5.30668°E | 31710 Info | |
| Alken railway station ^{(nl)} ^{(fr)} | | | Alken | Stationsplein 2 | 50.88676°N 5.29263°E | 31711 Info | More images |
| Brewery Alken ^{(nl)} ^{(fr)} | | | Alken | Stationsstraat 2 | 50.87863°N 5.30710°E | 31712 Info | |
| U-shaped farm ^{(nl)} ^{(fr)} | | | Alken | Stationsstraat 7 | 50.87768°N 5.30591°E | 31713 Info | |
| House ^{(nl)} ^{(fr)} | | | Alken | Stationsstraat 99 | 50.88494°N 5.29559°E | 31714 Info | |
| Brick chapel ^{(nl)} ^{(fr)} | | | Alken | Steenweg | 50.86385°N 5.24838°E | 31715 Info | |
| The Manor De Geuzentempel ^{(nl)} ^{(fr)} | Ja | | Alken | Steenweg 142 | 50.88790°N 5.28547°E | 31716 Info | |
| Long stretch of farm ^{(nl)} ^{(fr)} | | | Alken | Steenweg 114 | 50.88964°N 5.29040°E | 31718 Info | |
| Castle farm De Oude Vlieg ^{(nl)} ^{(fr)} | Ja | | Alken | Steenweg 239 | 50.88035°N 5.27460°E | 31719 Info | |
| Villa of 1911 ^{(nl)} ^{(fr)} | | | Alken | Steenweg 276 | 50.87690°N 5.26752°E | 31720 Info | |
| Long stretch of farm ^{(nl)} ^{(fr)} | Ja | | Alken | Steenweg 334 | 50.87225°N 5.26026°E | 31721 Info | |
| Farmhouse with separate components ^{(nl)} ^{(fr)} | | | Alken | Steenweg 352 | 50.87103°N 5.25861°E | 31722 Info | |
| Closed farm ^{(nl)} ^{(fr)} | | | Alken | Steenweg 361 | 50.87122°N 5.26007°E | 31723 Info | |
| Closed farm ^{(nl)} ^{(fr)} | | | Alken | Steenweg 363 | 50.87122°N 5.26007°E | 31723 Info | |
| Long stretch of farm ^{(nl)} ^{(fr)} | | | Alken | Steenweg 368 | 50.87009°N 5.25679°E | 31724 Info | |
| Closed farm ^{(nl)} ^{(fr)} | Ja | | Alken | Vliegstraat 35 | 50.87524°N 5.28205°E | 31725 Info | |
| Closed farm ^{(nl)} ^{(fr)} | Ja | | Alken | Vliegstraat 89 | 50.87870°N 5.27618°E | 31726 Info | |
| Long stretch of farm ^{(nl)} ^{(fr)} | | | Alken | Wolfstraat 6 | 50.86447°N 5.26912°E | 31727 Info | |
| Farmhouse with separate components ^{(nl)} ^{(fr)} | | | Alken | Wolfstraat 57 | 50.86640°N 5.26347°E | 31728 Info | |
| Mansion Zeegershof ^{(nl)} ^{(fr)} | Ja | | Alken | Koosterstraat 51 | 50.90367°N 5.27962°E | 31729 Info | |
| Immaculate Conception Parish ^{(nl)} ^{(fr)} | | | Alken | Parkstraat | 50.89841°N 5.27613°E | 31730 Info | |
| Castle d'Erckenteel ^{(nl)} ^{(fr)} | | | Alken | Parkstraat 9 | 50.89955°N 5.27668°E | 31731 Info | |
| Parish church of Saint George ^{(nl)} ^{(fr)} | | | Alken | St. Jorisstraat | 50.87156°N 5.27206°E | 84068 Info | |
| Farm in timber framing ^{(nl)} ^{(fr)} | Ja | | Alken | Stoukstraat 44 | 50.85826°N 5.25949°E | 200369 Info | |
| Farm in timber framing ^{(nl)} ^{(fr)} | OL001873; OL001874 | | Alken | Vliegstraat 93 | | 200381 Info | |

== See also ==
- List of onroerend erfgoed in Limburg (Belgium)
- Alken, Belgium
