= Jami al-Qarafa Mosque =

Mosque in Cairo, Egypt

- مسجد أو جامع القرافة

Religion
- Affiliation: Shia Islam
- Sect: Ismailism
- Ecclesiastical or organizational status: Friday mosque
- Status: Active

Location
- Location: Al-Qarafa, Islamic Cairo
- Country: Egypt

Architecture
- Type: Mosque
- Style: Fatimid
- Founder: Al-Sayyida al-Mu'iziyya
- Completed: 976 CE
- Dome: 1

The Jami al-Qarafa Mosque, also known as the Qarafa Mosque, is a Friday mosque located in Al-Qarafa, the great necropolis of Islamic Cairo and Fustat, Egypt. (Note: Al-Qarafa was the cemetery to the south of al-Qahira, lying between al-Muqattam Hill and Fustat. The mosque was at the center of the western half of this cemetery.) It was the second major mosque built by the Fatimid dynasty in their new capital of Cairo after their conquest of Egypt in 969 CE.

== History ==
The mosque was built in 976 CE by order of Al-Sayyida al-Mu'iziyya (also known as Durzan), mother of the Caliph al-'Aziz (r. 975–996), and her daughter Sitt al-Malik. It occupied the site of the older Mosque of the Dome (Masjid al-Qubba), and apparently was very large. al-Maqrizi, an historian, claims that the mosque was one of the most beautiful buildings of its day.

== Architecture ==
A possible layout was described by Jonathan Bloom in his "The Mosque of the Qarafa", although Yūsuf Rāghib pointed out problems with this reconstruction in his "La mosquée d'al-Qarāfa." In Bloom's opinion, the mosque had a central aisle, wider than the others and with a higher roof, that led a dome over the spaces before the mihrab. This was similar to the mosques of al-Azhar and al-Hākim bi-Amr Allāh.

The courtyard provided a place where the elite of Cairo would meet on Friday evenings in summer, and the covered qibla part of the mosque gave them a meeting place in the cooler weather. State festivals would be held at the mosque in which food was distributed to all classes of people. According to Ibn al-Zayyāt, it was an especially holy mosque, one where people would seek refuge in times of trouble. When a great fire burned down most of al-Fustat in 1168 CE, the mosque was almost completely destroyed, with only its green mihrab preserved.

It was later rebuilt as the Jami' al-Awliyya, but was little used after al-Qarafa became depopulated following a crisis in 1403 CE.

In 2024, it was reported via Reddit that the mosque and cemetery were being demolished.

== See also ==
- Shia Islam in Egypt
- List of mosques in Cairo
