= Ahmadiyya in Belgium =

Islamic movement

The Ahmadiyya Muslim Community was founded in Belgium in 1981, with an approximate 2000 adherents and over 15 branches within Belgium as of 2024.

== History ==
The first Ahmadi missionary to Belgium was Malik Ataur Rahman who arrived in Belgium in 1948 for a prospect of establishing a mission. However, in February 1981, Mirza Nasir Ahmad (the third Caliph of the community) sent Saleh Muhammad Khan to propagate the teaching of Islam Ahmadiyya, and in 1985, a building was purchased as a mission house in Dilbeek. In November 1992, the first Belgian Jalsa was held in the Dilbeek mission house, Bait-us-Salaam as a one-day event.

== Demographics ==
It is estimated that around 2000 Ahmadis live in Belgium, with approximately 1250 members living in the Flanders region, many of whom are immigrants from Pakistan and Bangladesh.

The community has 5 Mosques in the country, located in Antwerp and Brussels, Dilbeek and Alken (the latter two which were originally mission houses). The foundations for the first purpose-built Ahmadi mosque in Belgium was laid in 2011, the Bait-ul-Mujeeb mosque in Uccle, Belgium, and completed in 2020. Upon its completion, a number of guests including mayors were invited.

Ahmadiyya Mosques in Belgium
Mosque	City	Year	Notes
Mosque	City	Inaugurated	Notes
Bait-un-Noor	Lier	?	Mission house (51.12946212°N 4.57708783°E)
Bait-ul-Mujeeb Mosque	Uccle, Brussels	2020	First purpose-built mosque. (50.78547936°N 4.32908022°E)
Bait-ur-Raheem	Alken	Est.	(50.87540305°N 5.26447106°E)
Bait-us-Salam	Dilbeek, Brussels	1985 (Est.)	First mosque in the country, initially a mission house. (50.87591834°N 4.23938335°E)
Dar-ul-Tabligh Aziz	Antwerp	2000 (Est.)	(51.24107983°N 4.43874373°E)

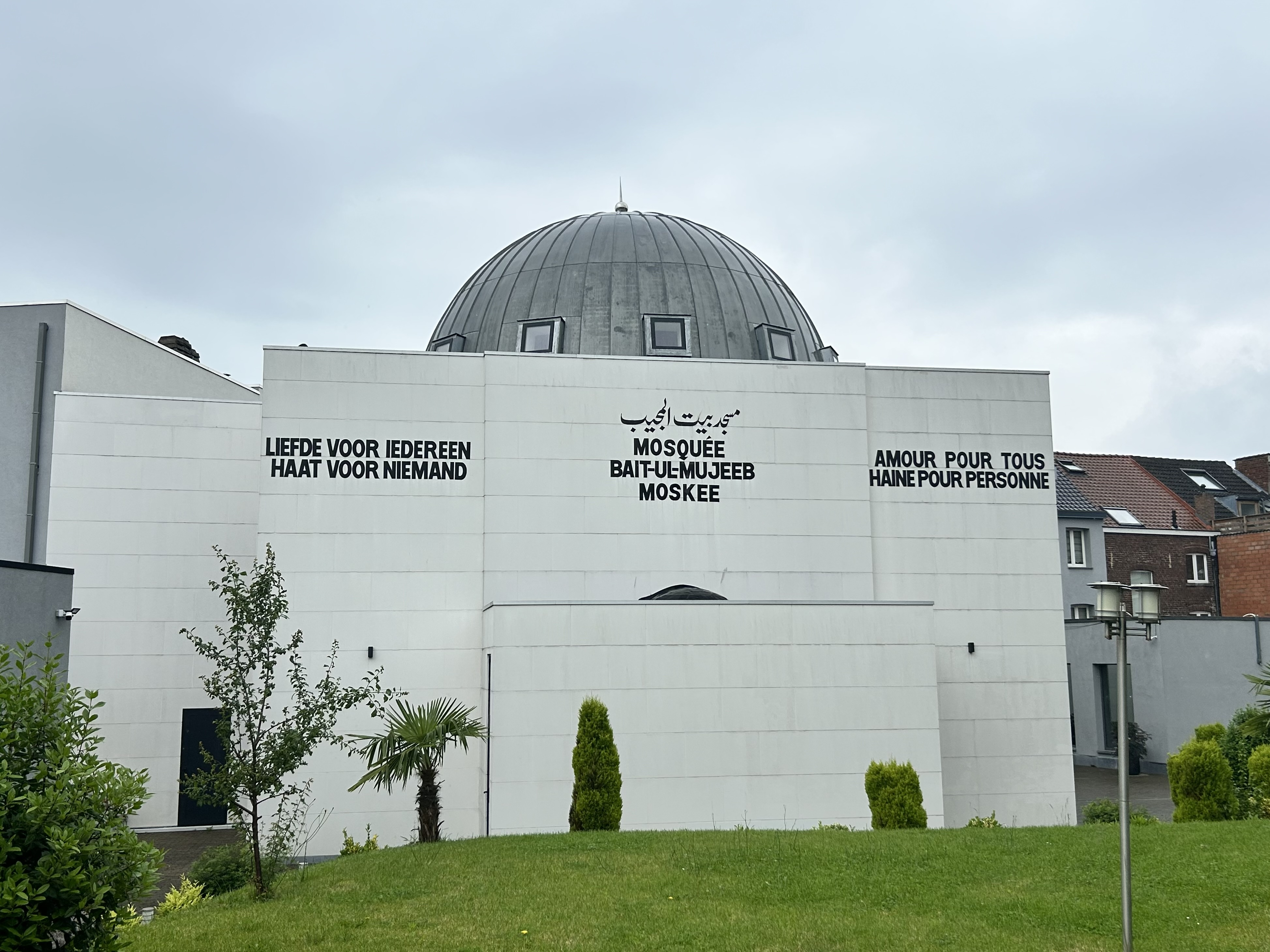
The Baitul Mujeeb Mosque in Uccle, Brussels

Locations of Ahmadi Muslim Mosques (Green) & mission houses (Red) in Belgium

== See also ==
- Islam in Belgium
- Ahmadiyya in Germany
- Ahmadiyya by country
