= Ahmadiyya in Syria =

Islamic movement

Ahmadiyya is an Islamic religious movement in Syria under the spiritual leadership of the caliph in London.

The history of the movement in Syria begins in the 1920s, when the second caliph of the Community, Mirza Basheer-ud-Din Mahmood Ahmad visited Damascus, as part of his tour of Europe and the Middle East. From Palestine, he traveled to Damascus by train where he is reported to have attracted publicity as well as some opposition. He discussed the claims of the founder of the Community, Mirza Ghulam Ahmad, with leading scholars, and other intellectual figures from Damascus.

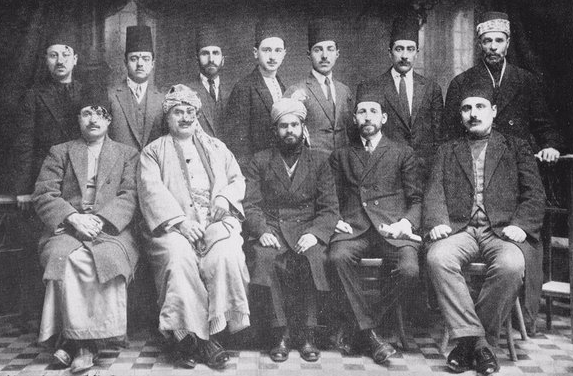
Late 1920s, Damascus: Early Syrian converts to the Ahmadiyya movement. Seated at the center is Jala-ud-Din Shams.

Following his journey to the Middle East, the caliph appointed Sayyid Zayn al'Abidin Waliullah Shah and Jalal al-Din Shams to be sent for a mission in Damascus. Arriving in 1925, the two missionaries, who were also companions of Mirza Ghulam Ahmad, were amongst the first missionaries dispatched to the Middle East. Along with Maulvi Abu'l-'Ata Jalandhari, who arrived for a mission in Jerusalem, the three missionaries spent their time spreading Ahmadi teachings in major towns and cities across the Middle East, including Haifa, Beirut and Cairo. Shah himself was able to obtain a position of lectureship at the "Sultania College" in Damascus for period of time before his return to Qadian, the then international headquarters of the Ahmadiyya movement. Following his return, Shams was left alone in Damascus at the instruction of the caliph. Opposition to Shams' efforts began to surface soon after Shah's return. While he was refused services at local stores, local newspapers expressed their resentment through the publications of satirical cartoons that mocked his efforts. By 1927, he was stabbed by a local resident in Damascus. In order to maintain public order, the reigning French authorities desired for him to leave Syria. However, following the instructions of the caliph, Shams continued to stay in Syria, until as a recourse, the French authorities decided to expel Shams themselves in January 1928.

With Shams departure ended the Ahmadiyya missionary efforts in Syria for a number of decades.

== See also ==
- Ahmadiyya by country
- Islam in Syria
