= Sint-Truiden railway station =

Railway station in Limburg, Belgium

Sint-Truiden
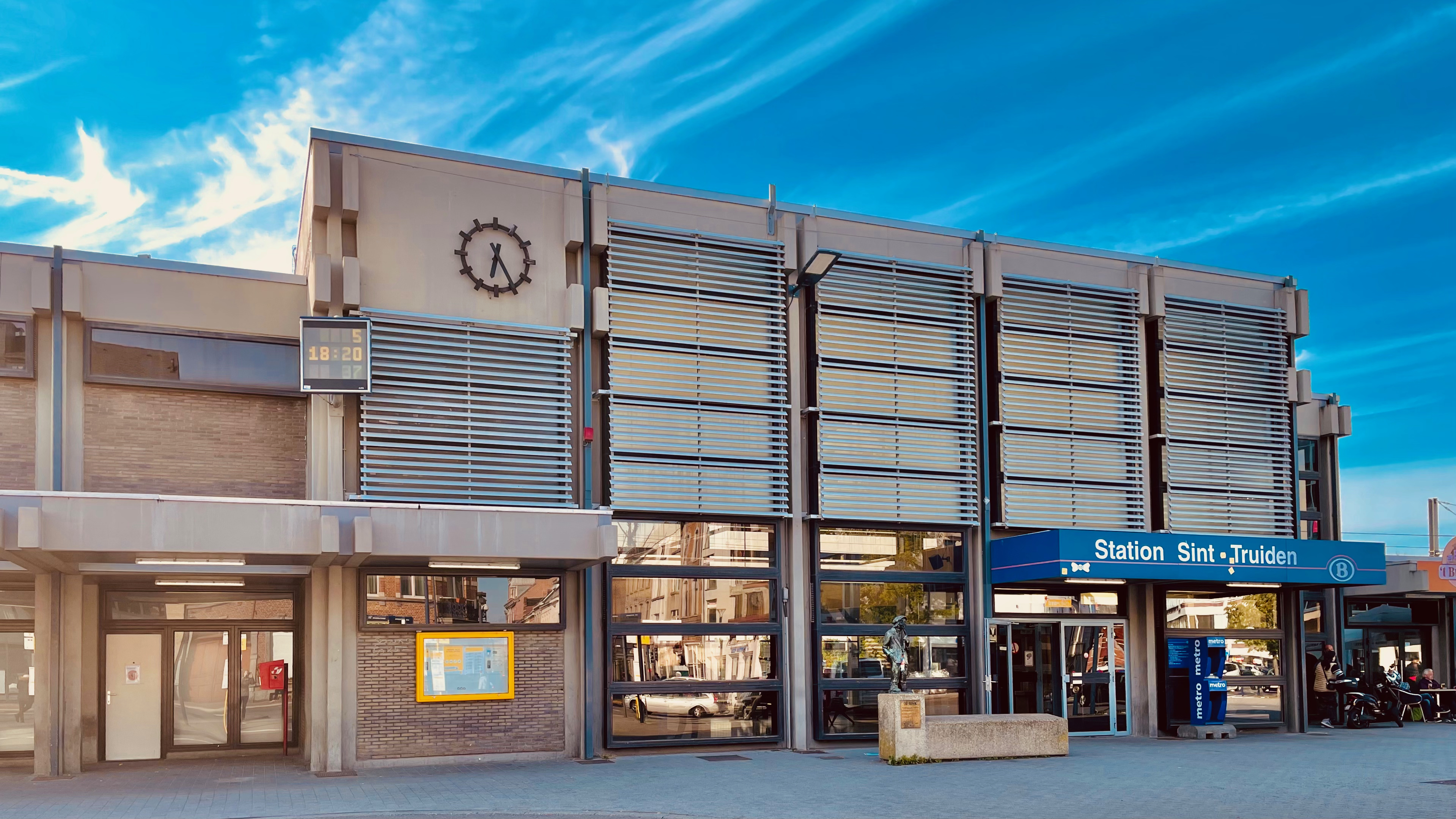
- Sint-Truiden railway station

General information
- Location: Sint-Truiden, Limburg; Belgium
- Coordinates: 50°49′03″N 5°10′34″E
- System: Railway Station
- Owner: NMBS/SNCB
- Operator: NMBS/SNCB
- Line: 21 (Landen-Hasselt)
- Platforms: 3
- Tracks: 3

Other information
- Station code: FST
- Website: Official website

History
- Opened: 6 October 1839; 186 years ago

Passengers
- 2014: 1,640 per day
Location
- Location within Belgium

Sint-Truiden railway station (Dutch: Station Sint-Truiden; French: Gare de Saint-Trond) (Note: Officially Sint-Truiden (Dutch: Sint-Truiden; French: Saint-Trond)) is a railway station in Sint-Truiden, Limburg, Belgium. The station opened on 6 October 1839 and is located on railway line 21. The train services are operated by the National Railway Company of Belgium (NMBS/SNCB).

== History ==
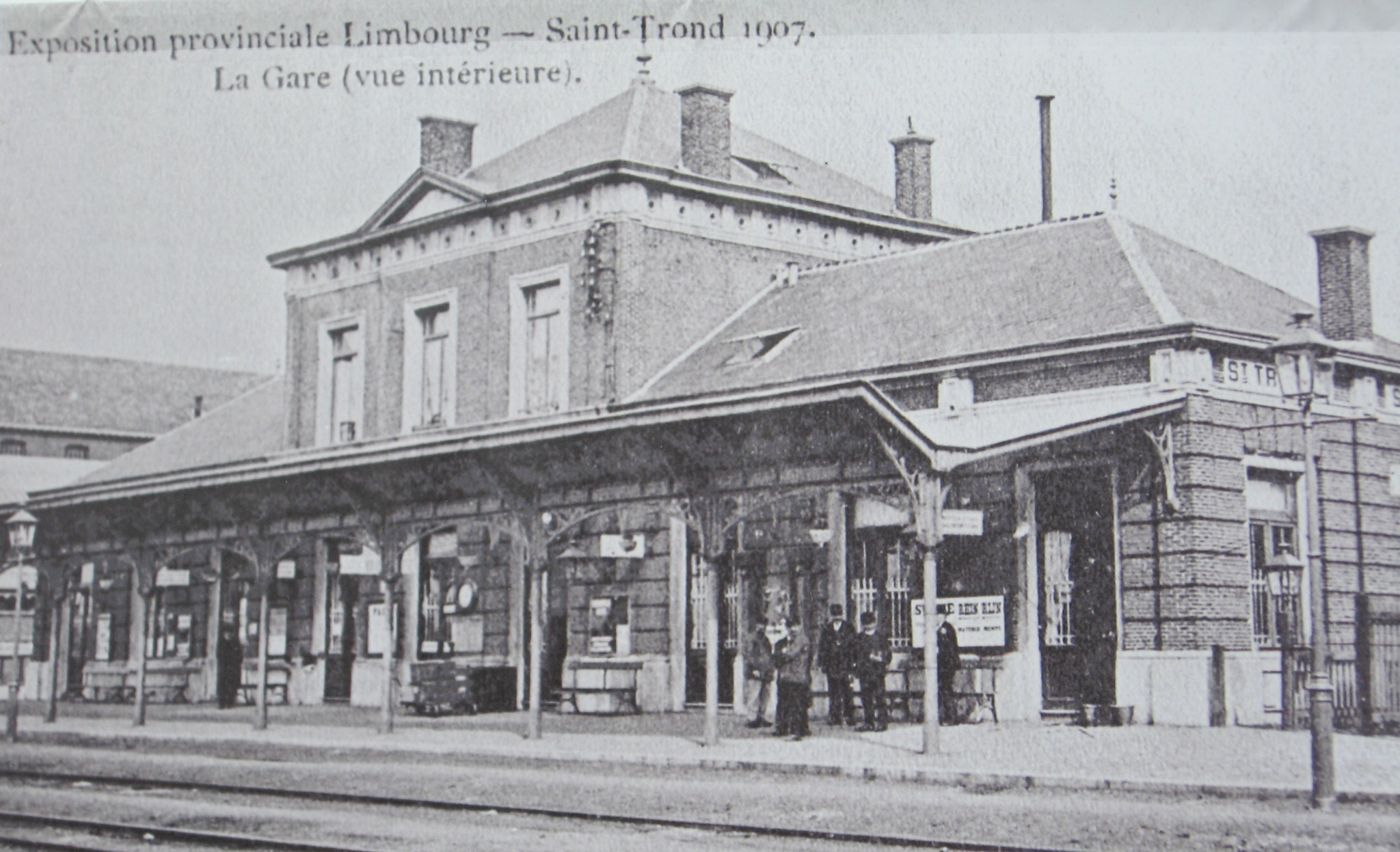
The station building from 1882 to 1975, pictured in 1907

Sint-Truiden used to be located on railway line 23 between Drieslinter and Tongeren. The current station dates from the 1970s and replaced a building dating from 1882, which was demolished in 1975.

In 2005, the station and its surrounding area were modernised. On that occasion, extra bicycle parking was created and the comfort for train passengers was increased. The platforms were also renovated and raised between 2020 and 2021. This brings them to a standard height of 76 cm, which should greatly improve accessibility.

== Train services ==
The station is served by the following services:

- Intercity services (IC-03) Knokke/Blankenberge - Bruges - Ghent - Brussels - Leuven - Hasselt - Genk

Preceding station	NMBS/SNCB	Following station
Landen towards Blankenberge or Knokke	IC 03	Alken towards Genk

== Gallery ==
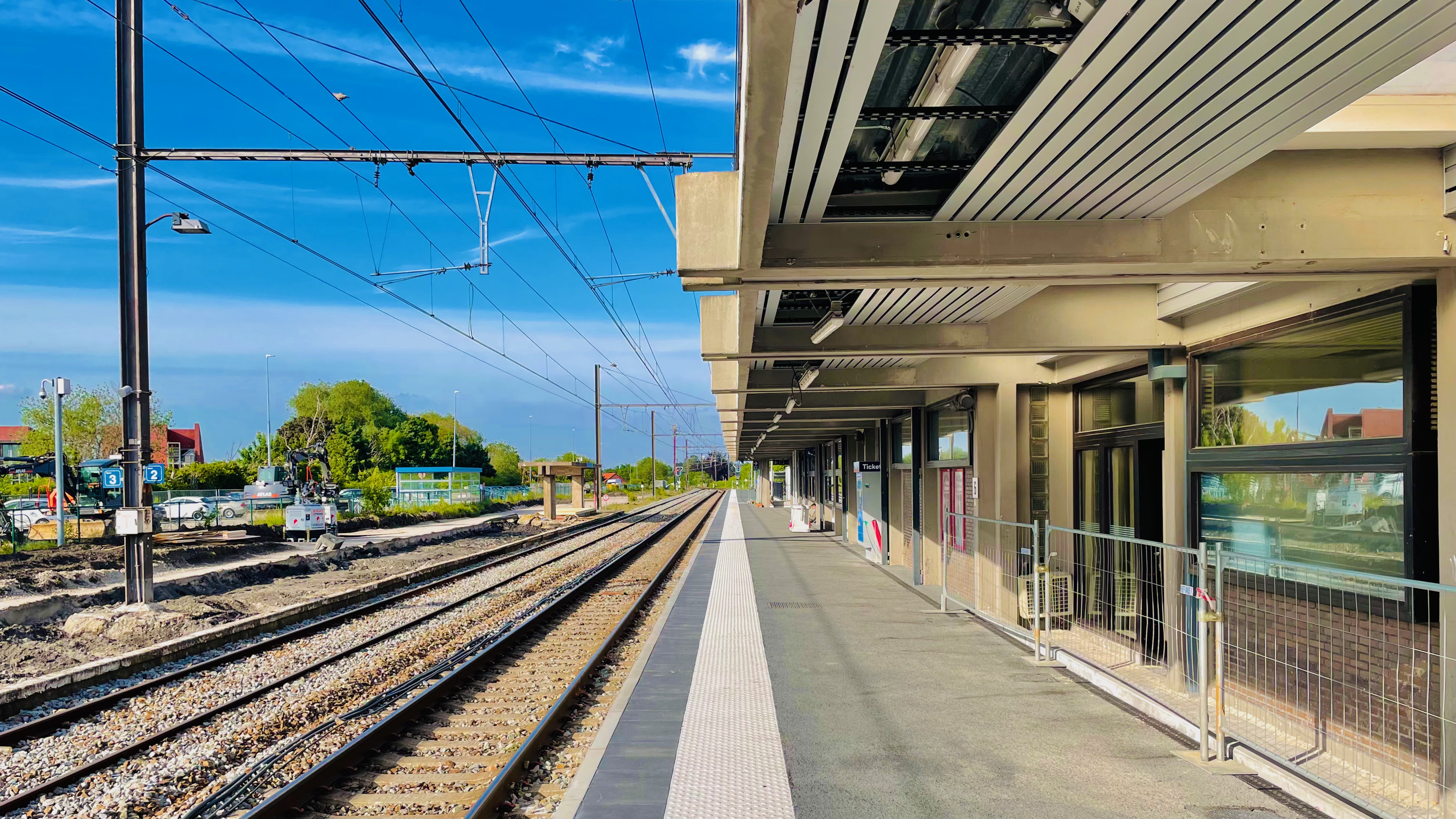
View of the platforms and tracks

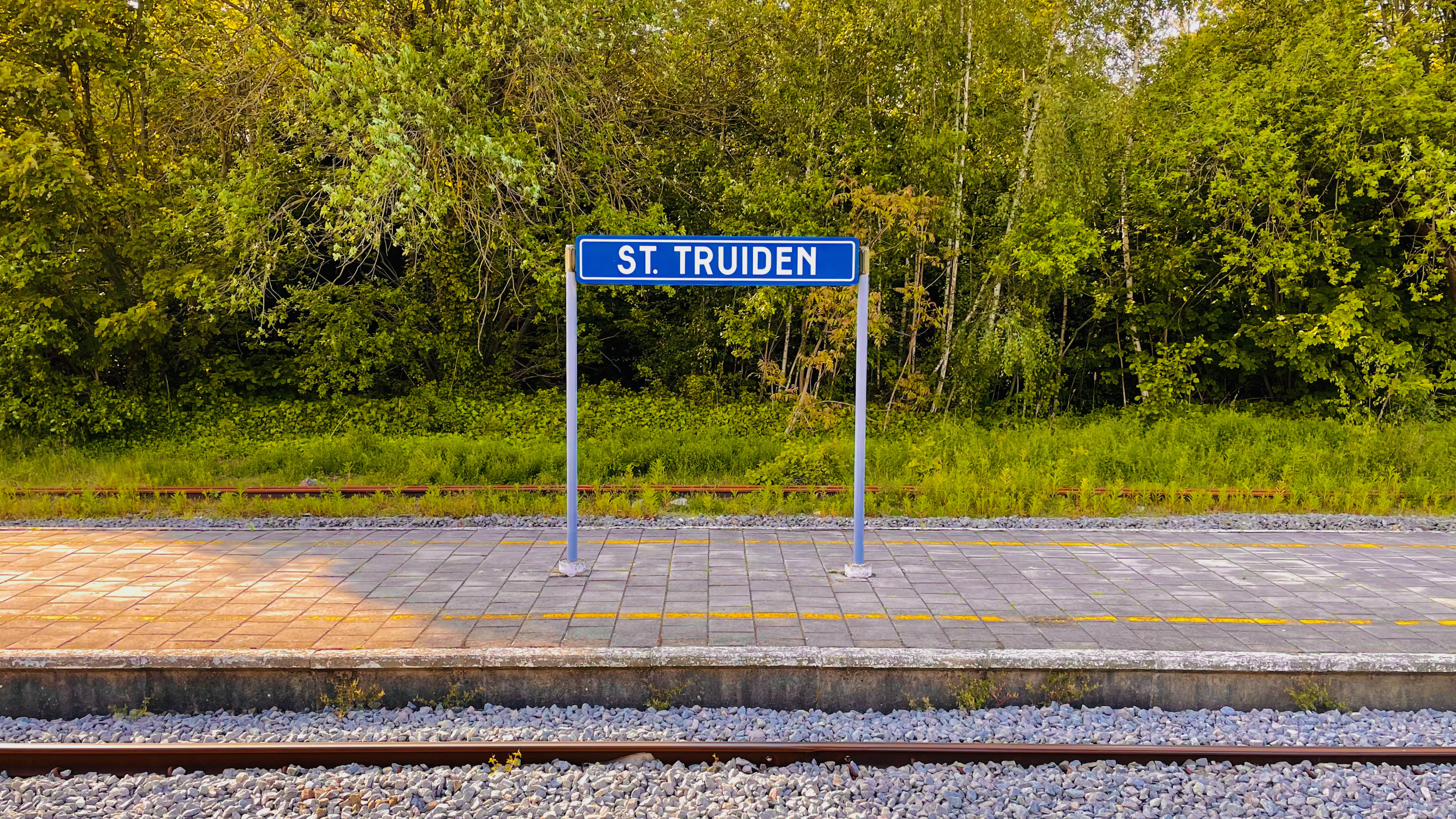
Place name sign on a platform

== See also ==
- List of railway stations in Belgium
- Rail transport in Belgium
