= Ahmadiyya in Egypt =

Islamic movement

The Ahmadiyya is an Islamic movement in Egypt with origins in the Indian subcontinent. Although the earliest contact between Egyptians and the Ahmadiyya movement was during the lifetime of Mirza Ghulam Ahmad, its founder, the movement in Egypt was formally established in 1922 under the leadership of its second Caliph Opposition to the Ahmadiyya grew particularly in the latter part the 20th century and Ahmadis have seen increased hostility in Egypt more recently. There are up to 50,000 Ahmadi Muslims in Egypt.

== History ==
=== Early contact ===
According to Ahmadi historical literature, the earliest contact between Egyptian people and Ahmadi Muslims of British India dates back to the lifetime of Mirza Ghulam Ahmad whose writings, by the turn of the 20th century, were distributed among the religious elite in the Arab world and whose book I'jāz al-masīḥ (Miracle of the Messiah) was reviewed in several Egyptian periodicals. One such review which was critical of the work was reproduced and amplified in an Indian magazine by his detractors in response to which Ghulam Ahmad wrote the book Al-hudā wa al-tabṣiratu limań yarā (Guidance for Perceiving Minds). When, in 1902, Ghulam Ahmad instructed his followers to abstain from inoculating themselves against the plague, the move was criticised by the Egyptian nationalist and journalist Mustafa Kamil Pasha, editor of the newspaper al-Liwā (The Standard), in response to which Ghulam Ahmad authored the book Mawāhib al-raḥmān (Gifts of the Gracious [God]).

=== Interwar period ===
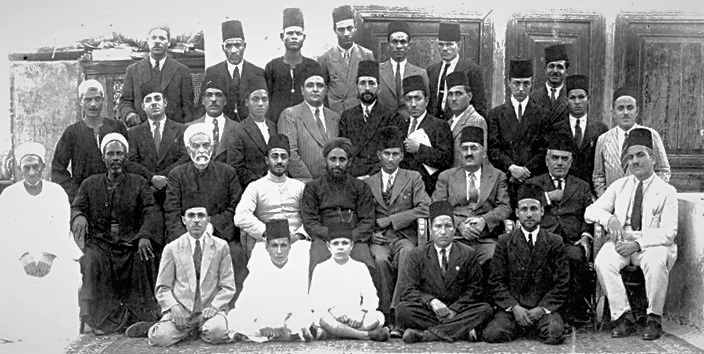
Cairo 1938: A group of early Egyptian Ahmadis with Maulana Abu᾽l-῾Ata Jalandhari (seated center, turbuned) and Mirza Nasir Ahmad to his right.

Organised activity within the country, however, did not begin until the early 1920s when several Ahmadi missionaries such as Sayyid Zayn al-῾Abidin Waliullah Shah, Jalal al-Din Shams and Abu᾽l-῾Ata Jalandhari were dispatched to the Middle East by Mirza Bashir-ud-Din Mahmud Ahmad, the second Caliph within the movement. These missionaries travelled to major towns and cities throughout the region, including Cairo, to spread Ahmadi teachings. A missionary arrived in Cairo in 1922 from where he reported a number of conversions some time later. By this time, news about the success of Ahmadi missionary work in Europe had reached the Muslim world and caused notable controversies particularly among early Salafi circles in Egypt whose response to the Ahmadiyya vacillated between their uncompromising ideological differences with the movement and a desire to welcome its pioneering missionary efforts in Europe during the interwar period. Despite their adamant rejection of Ghulam Ahmad's theology, Salafi writers associated with Rashid Rida and his journal al-Manār (The Lighthouse) wrote appreciatively of the role of the Ahmadiyya movement in Europe and the conversion of many Europeans to Islam. These writers were aware of the split within the movement and that most of the Ahmadi activity in Europe at this time aligned itself with the splinter group Lahore Ahmadiyya Movement. This group's affirmation of Ghulam Ahmad merely as a reformer and its attempts to downplay sectarian differences made it less controversial among some Salafi groups than the main branch under the Caliph at Qadian. Khwaja Kamal-ud-Din, the leader of the Lahore group at the Woking mosque in England, was considered by Rida a "moderate" follower of the Ahmadiyya and he generally agreed with his supporters in Egypt.

In 1923, Kamal-ud-Din; Abdul Mohye, the Mufti of the Woking mosque; and Baron Lord Headley, a prominent British convert to Islam also associated with the Woking mosque, visited Egypt on their way to the Hajj pilgrimage and were welcomed with much fanfare. Reception committees were organised in Port Said, Cairo and Alexandria, large gatherings appeared at train stations to receive them and prayers and speeches were made after Friday prayer at the Al-Hussein Mosque in honour of the "British Muslims". The visit was also favourably covered in the Islamic press in Egypt, including al-Manār, although Rida, its editor, was unable to meet the group himself. On the whole, Rida's attitude towards the Ahmadiyya movement was inconsistent between its creed and its religious work in India and Europe. Although he concluded that Ahmadis of both branches were "followers of falsehood", he eulogised Kamal-ud-Din upon his death and considered him "the greatest missionary to Islam" at that time.

Relative to Rida's intellectual Salafism, by the late 1920s, the al-Fath (The Opening) magazine, under its editor Muhib al-Din al-Khatib, began to represent a more populist strand of Salafism and adopted a more decidedly anti-Ahmadi stance. As part of an effort to combat Ahmadi proselytising among Muslims, heated articles against the Ahmadiyya began to appear in al-Fath and ceremonies were held in Cairo in 1932 celebrating former Ahmadis who wished to publicly renounce their affiliation to the movement. In 1933, the official organ of Al-Azhar University published a few articles in refutation of Ahmadi beliefs, and in the late 1930s two Albanian students belonging to the Lahore Ahmadiyya Movement were expulsed from Al-Azhar because of their Ahmadi affiliation. The anti-Ahmadi campaign was continued by Hassan al-Banna, the founder of the Muslim Brotherhood, when he took the editorship of al-Manār in 1940. Though by 1939 an Ahmadi source had placed the number of Ahmadis in Egypt at 100.

=== Doctrinal controversies ===
As evinced by Abu᾽l-῾Ata Jalandhari’s foreword to his 1933 tract The Cairo Debate, Ahmadi activity in the Arab world during this period was primarily concerned with counteracting Christian missionary efforts against Islam and regenerating what the movement believed was the true Islamic spirit among Muslims. In this context, Ahmadi teachings, specifically regarding the death of Jesus and his status within Islam, concurred, in principle, with the views of key Salafi (or proto-Salafi) figures such as Muhammad Abduh and Rashid Rida, both of whom rejected the bodily ascension of Jesus and accepted the view that he escaped crucifixion, died a natural death and will not be coming again. These views were expressed in a comprehensive Qur'anic commentary published serially in al-Manār, although in contrast to the Ahmadi view which maintained that Jesus survived crucifixion, they held that he was not crucified at all. Rida also discussed the Ahmadi theory of Jesus’ burial in Kashmir in a positive tone—as did the Egyptian literary figure ‘Abbas Mahmud al-‘Aqqad. Similarly, Mustafa al-Maraghi, the rector of Al-Azhar University, too believed that Jesus had died a natural death and interpreted his ascension and return metaphorically.

In response to a question put forward by an Indian Ahmadi to Mahmud Shaltut, a teacher (later shaykh) of Al-Azhar, as to whether, according to the Quran and sunnah, Jesus was alive or dead, and whether or not he will return at the end of time, Shaltut issued a fatwa in 1942 stating that according to the Quran, Jesus had died and that it contained no indication that he lives on in heaven. As to the hadith material concerning his return, Shaltut questioned their soundness and concluded that a good Muslim did not have to believe in Jesus' return. Although the fatwa—and the ensuing discussion surrounding it—has been seen, in the Egyptian context, as indicating that Ahmadi interpretations were not necessarily ruled out as heretical during this period, scholarly opinion on this issue was far from consensual and the fatwa met with immediate resistance from other teachers at Al-Azhar such as Siddiq al-Ghumari who issued a statement strongly upholding the traditional Muslim belief in Jesus' physical ascension, arguing for the soundness of hadith literature concerning his return and declaring it among the fundamentals of Islam. Other scholars at Al-Azhar took a neutral position and declared that both views were "thoroughly Islamic".

=== Late 20th century– present ===
In 1962 Al-Azhar released a fatwa declaring that Ahmadis had deviated from Islam excepting the separatist Lahore group. However, beyond the sphere of purely scholarly disputes, more public opposition to the Ahmadiyya movement has historically been championed by the Muslim Brotherhood who placed the Ahmadis with denominations they believed "posed a threat to Islam", actively deterring other Muslims from joining them and refusing them burial in Muslim cemeteries. As of the 21st century, there has been an upsurge of hostility towards the Ahmadiyya in Egypt. In 2008, the Ahmadiyya satellite television channel MTA 3 Al Arabiya, which had been transmitting to the Arab regions for almost a year via the Egyptian-owned company Nilesat, was shut down by the government without prior notice. The channel now runs via the European-based Eutelsat - Atlantic Bird 4 with a much broader coverage across the Middle East and North Africa. Ahmadis, along with other Muslim groups deemed to be deviant have been hounded by police under Egypt's defamation laws and governments that seek to outdo the Muslim Brotherhood in championing Sunni orthodoxy.

Eleven Ahmadis were arrested in Egypt on 15 March 2010 and nine detained under Egypt's emergency law—a law ostensibly restricted to addressing crimes involving terrorism or drug trafficking—on charges of 'contempt of religions' and 'undermining national stability'. These Ahmadis were held by the State Security Investigation in Cairo, Qalyubia, Minya and Sohag governates and interrogated specifically about their religious beliefs for two months without being brought to court or indicted. According to the Egyptian Initiative for Personal Rights (EIPR), the arrests and interrogations were in violation of both Egypt's constitution, which protected the freedom of belief and expression, as well as its international obligations.

== Demographics ==
According to Professor Bruce Lawrence (2013), Ahmadis in Egypt number "less than 50,000", a figure based upon his contacts within the country. A 2012 report in the Egyptian daily Al-Masry Al-Youm, stated that the number of "Qadiyanis"—a pejorative for Ahmadis—in Egypt was increasing and reaching the thousands, attracting over 10,000 registered visitors to their sites despite the otherwise discreet presence of Ahmadis within Egypt.

== See also ==
- Ahmadiyya in Algeria
- Ahmadiyya in Morocco
- Shia Islam in Egypt
