= Ahmadiyya in Switzerland =

Islamic movement

Ahmadiyya is an Islamic branch in Switzerland, under the spiritual leadership of the caliph in London. The Community was founded on October 13, 1946, during the late period of the Second Caliphate, when the caliph directed Shaikh Nasir Ahmad to establish a mission in the country. Today there are two Ahmadi mosques and 14 local branches, representing an estimated 800 Ahmadi Muslims.

== History ==
=== Early years ===
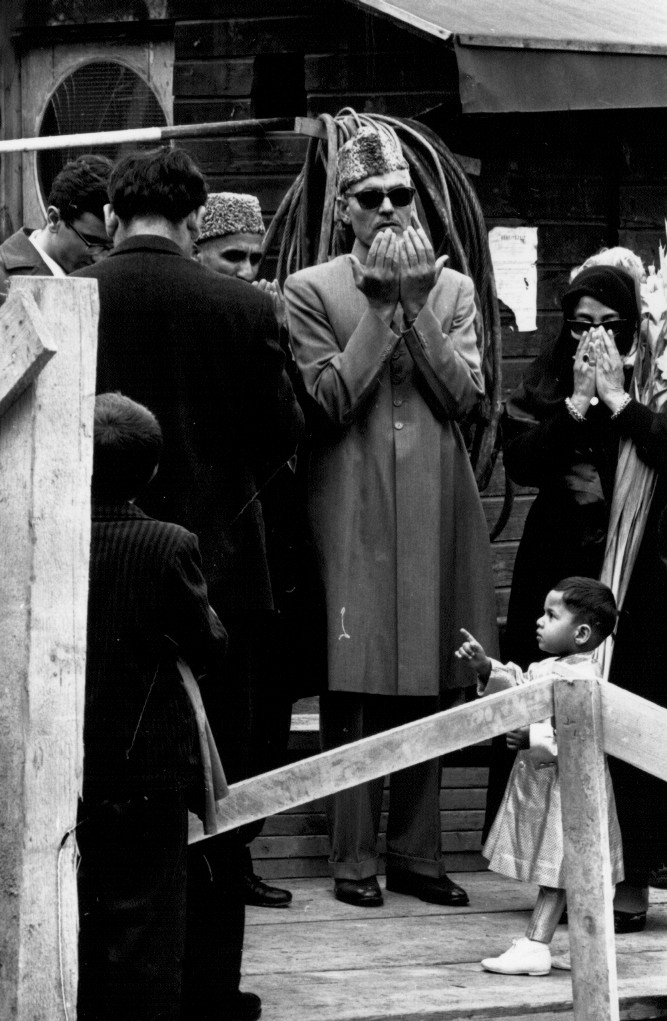
Amtul Hafeez Begum, daughter of Mirza Ghulam Ahmad. She laid the foundation stone for the Mahmud Mosque, the first mosque in the country. On her right is Mushtaq Ahmad Bajwa, a missionary.

The Ahmadiyya Muslim Community of Switzerland was founded in the year 1946, following the Second World War. In the 1940s three missionaries were appointed to open an Ahmadi mission in German-speaking Europe, at the request of the second Caliph Mirza Basheer-ud-Din Mahmood Ahmad. On October 13, 1946, the three Ahmadi Muslim missionaries, Sheikh Nasir Ahmad, Abdul Latif and Ghulam Ahmad Bashir met in Zurich, Switzerland, intending to establish a mission in Germany. However, due to the recent conclusion of the war, they were unable to enter the country. As a result, a mission was established in Zurich instead. Soon after, Abdul Latif and Ghulam Ahmad Bashir left the country for the Netherlands, whilst Sheikh Nasir Ahmad continued to serve Switzerland for the following 16 years, until 1962. During this period a German translation of the Quran was published and an Islamic journal Der Islam was founded.

In 1960, in view of growing multiculturalism, the country's municipal government offered the Ahmadiyya Muslim Community a parcel of land for the construction of a mosque, at a rate of 3000 francs annually, for 60 years. The location was in a residential zone in Zurich, opposite a church. The mosque project received overwhelming support from local and national groups. However, it wasn't without criticism. National churches belonging to various Christian denominations in Switzerland, including the Catholic Church, pointed out in a joint statement that whilst the government is offering Muslims a place for the construction of a mosque, the churches are facing difficulty in finding construction sites for their places of worship. The Swiss evangelical party responded to the governments offer as an "unfortunate way of showing preference to a religious minority in attacking the religious sentiments of the majority of [residents of Zurich]." Nevertheless, the issue was resolved and the construction project was given the green light. On August 25, 1962, Amatul Hafiz Begum, the daughter of the founder of the Community, Mirza Ghulam Ahmad, laid the foundation stone for the first mosque in the country. The opening ceremony was held on 22 June 1963 led by Sir Muhammad Zafrullah Khan, who was at that time the President of the 17th UN General Assembly. Emil Landolt, the Mayor of Zurich was also present. The mosque was named the Mahmud Mosque. By opening the mosque, the Community set a visible presence of Muslims in Switzerland.

=== Recent years ===
Locations of the two Ahmadi Muslim mosques in Switzerland.

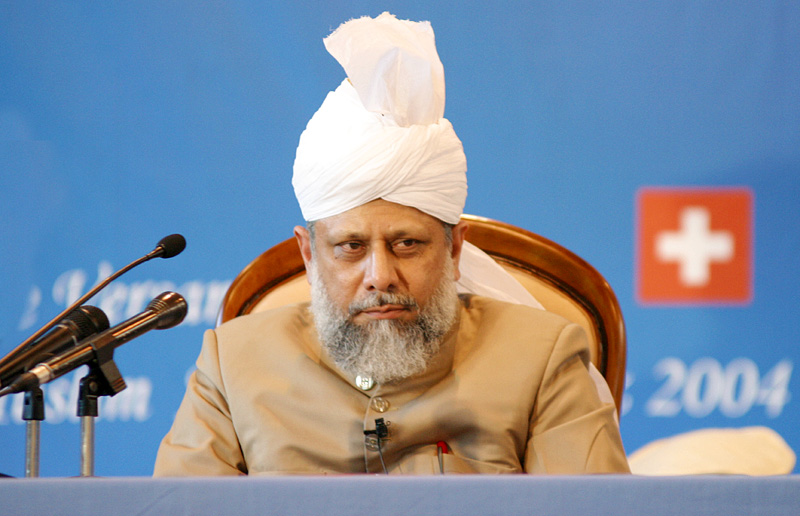
Fifth Caliph of the community Mirza Masroor Ahmad heading the 2004 Jalsa Salana Switzerland during his Europe tour that year

Over the years, the Ahmadiyya Muslim Community grew primarily due to immigration from Pakistan. By the 1990s, the Mahmood Mosque was becoming too small to house its members. As a consequence, the Community began to search for a place, for another mosque. 15 years later, in 2005 the Community found a suitable place, a joinery in Haüsern, a hamlet in the municipality of Wigoltingen, in Thurgau. The national president of the Ahmadiyya Muslim Community of Switzerland, W. Tarnutzer, wrote to the caliph, in London, requesting approval of the project. After approving the project, the Community proposed the project to the municipal government. On one hand the council disapproved the project and on the other, a number of residents in the neighbourhood began to collect signatures against the project. The Community organized an informational event in response to the negative reaction. In order to avoid self-portrayal, the event featured positive remarks from a non-Muslim journalist and a priest. Following the event, there were no objections. The mosque is named the "Nuur Mosque".

== Modern community ==
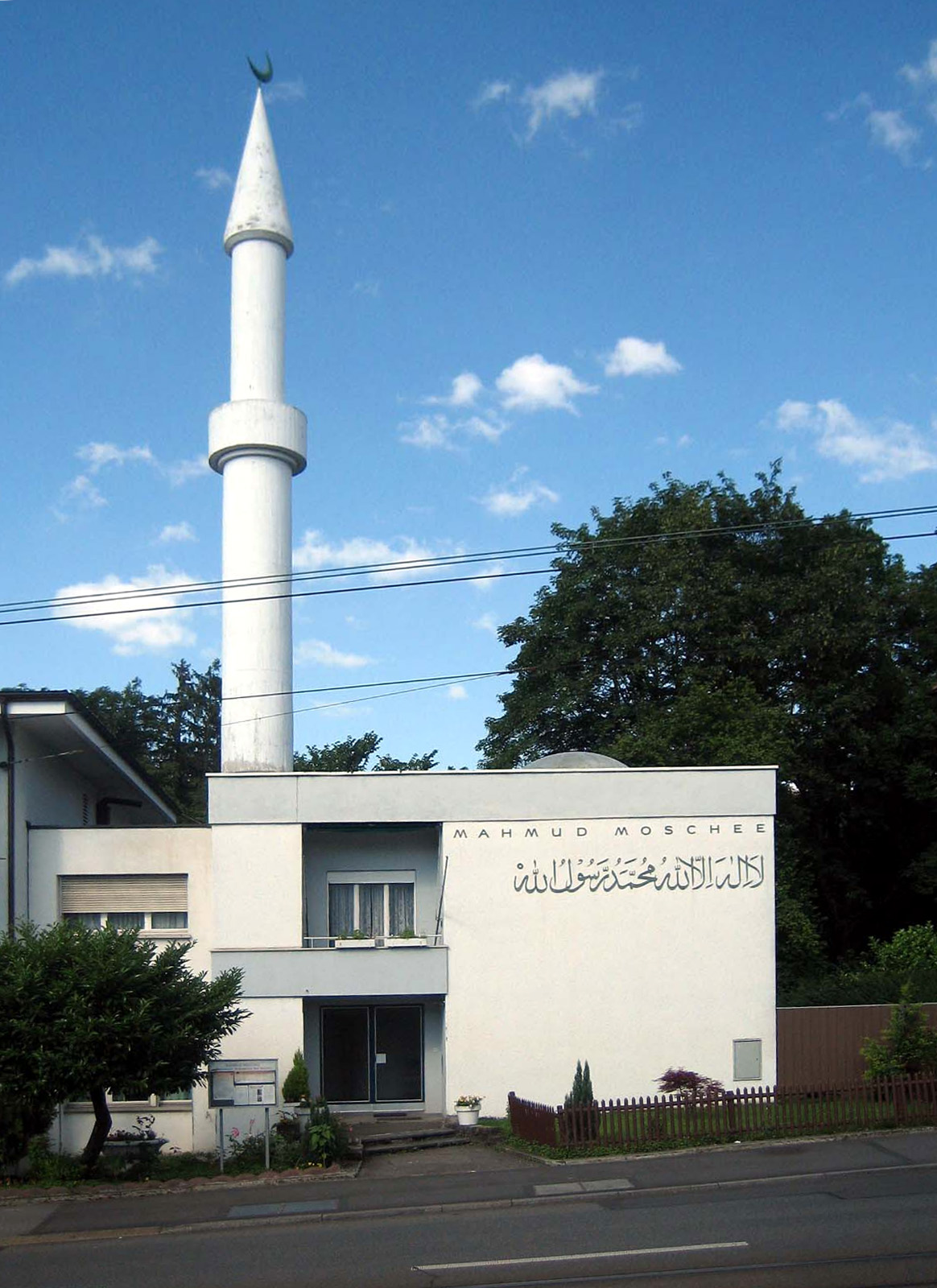
The Mahmud Mosque, the first of the four mosques in Switzerland which have a minaret.

Predominantly aiming at the perceived misconceptions of the place of Islam in modern society, the Swiss Ahmadiyya Muslim Community regularly organizes public lectures, discussions and open house days at their mosques.

There are 14 local chapters and an estimated 800 Ahmadis in Switzerland, many of which are descendants of immigrants from Pakistan. There are two Ahmadi Muslim mosques in the country, the Mahmud Mosque, in Zurich and the Nuur Mosque, in Wigoltingen, which is due to undergo construction. Both mosques lie in the German-speaking part of the country. The current national president is Walid Tariq Tarnutzer and the national missionary in-charge is Sadaqat Ahmed.

== See also ==
- Ahmadiyya in Germany
- Islam in Switzerland
