= Ahmadiyya in Algeria =

Islamic movement

Ahmadiyya is a religious sect in Algeria, with around 2,000 followers. Its presence in the country dates back to the 1970s.

In 2013, the Algerian Ministry of Religious Affairs expressed concern over the rise of a number of radical religious movements, including Ahmadism which according to them "is becoming as deeply entrenched in North Africa as takfiri Salafism and Wahhabism", and decided to take action by strengthening the monitoring and control of the places targeted by the radical Islamists for recruits. In 2016, Ahmadi sect members had been detained and accused of various offences with detentions occurring in Larbaâ, Algiers, Skikda, Sidi Ameur, M'Sila and Beni Saf.

== See also ==
- Islam in Algeria
- Ahmadiyya in Egypt
- Ahmadiyya in Morocco
- Persecution of Ahmadis in Algeria
