= Ahmadiyya in Guinea-Bissau =

Islamic movement

Ahmadiyya is an Islamic community in Guinea-Bissau under the leadership of the caliph in London.

First established in the country in 1995, during the era of the Fourth Caliphate, in 2012, the Community represented an estimated 2% of the country's Muslim population, corresponding to approximately 13,000 people.

== History ==
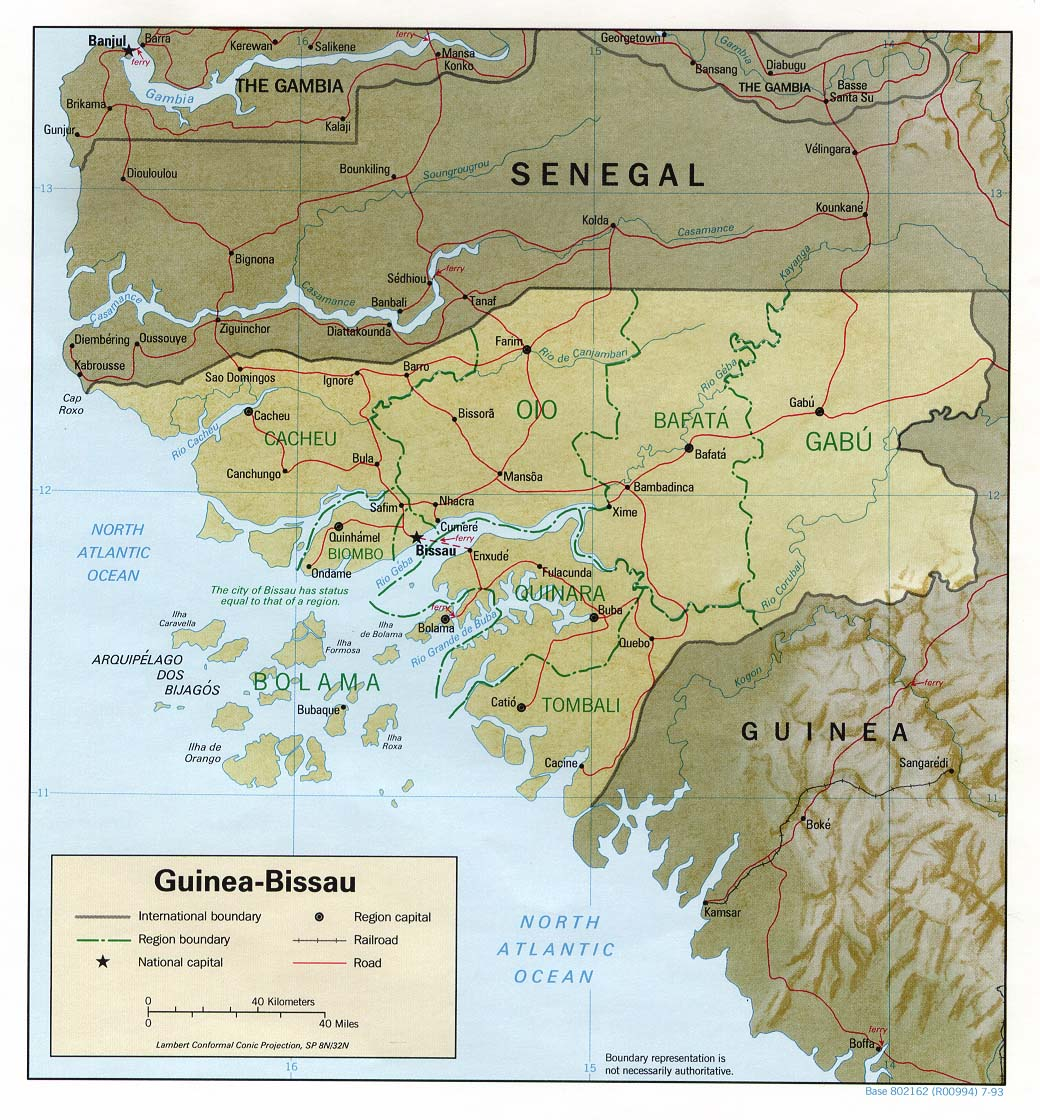
Relief map of Guinea-Bissau

The Ahmadiyya Muslim Community of Guinea-Bissau was first established in 1995. However, it has not had an easy beginning since its founding. Only six years later, on August 20, 2001, the then-president of Guinea-Bissau, Kumba Ialá, ordered the closure of Ahmadi mosques and mission houses and called for the expulsion of Ahmadi Muslim missionaries of foreign Pakistani origin to leave the country within a period of "48 hours". In a meeting held with 500 Muslim leaders in the country, the president accused Ahmadi Muslims of interfering with the nation's politics and of creating misunderstanding and instability within the Muslim populations. In response to the decision, Sory Djalo resigned from his post as the president's religious affairs advisor.

In response to the president's decision, the Community appealed at Bissau's Regional Court, one of the nine regional courts in the country. The court found that the decision made by the president violated the nation's constitution, which guarantees religious freedom and prohibits dissolution of religious groups without a prior court approval. As a consequence, the decision was declared void and unconstitutional. Despite this, the Community was still banned.

In January 2005, the Ahmadiyya Muslim Community was permitted to resume its religious activity, only to be banned once again two months later, in March. The reason attributed to this decision was a dispute in Gabú city between Ahmadis and non-Ahmadi Muslims, which resulted in the injury of four Ahmadi Muslims. A year later, in 2006, the Community appealed the government's decision to ban its religious activity again. Once again, the government granted the Community the right to practice its faith openly. Between 2006 and 2017, there have been no reports of discrimination against Ahmadi Muslims, governmental or otherwise.

== See also ==
- Islam in Guinea-Bissau
