= Alken railway station =

Railway station in Limburg, Belgium

Alken
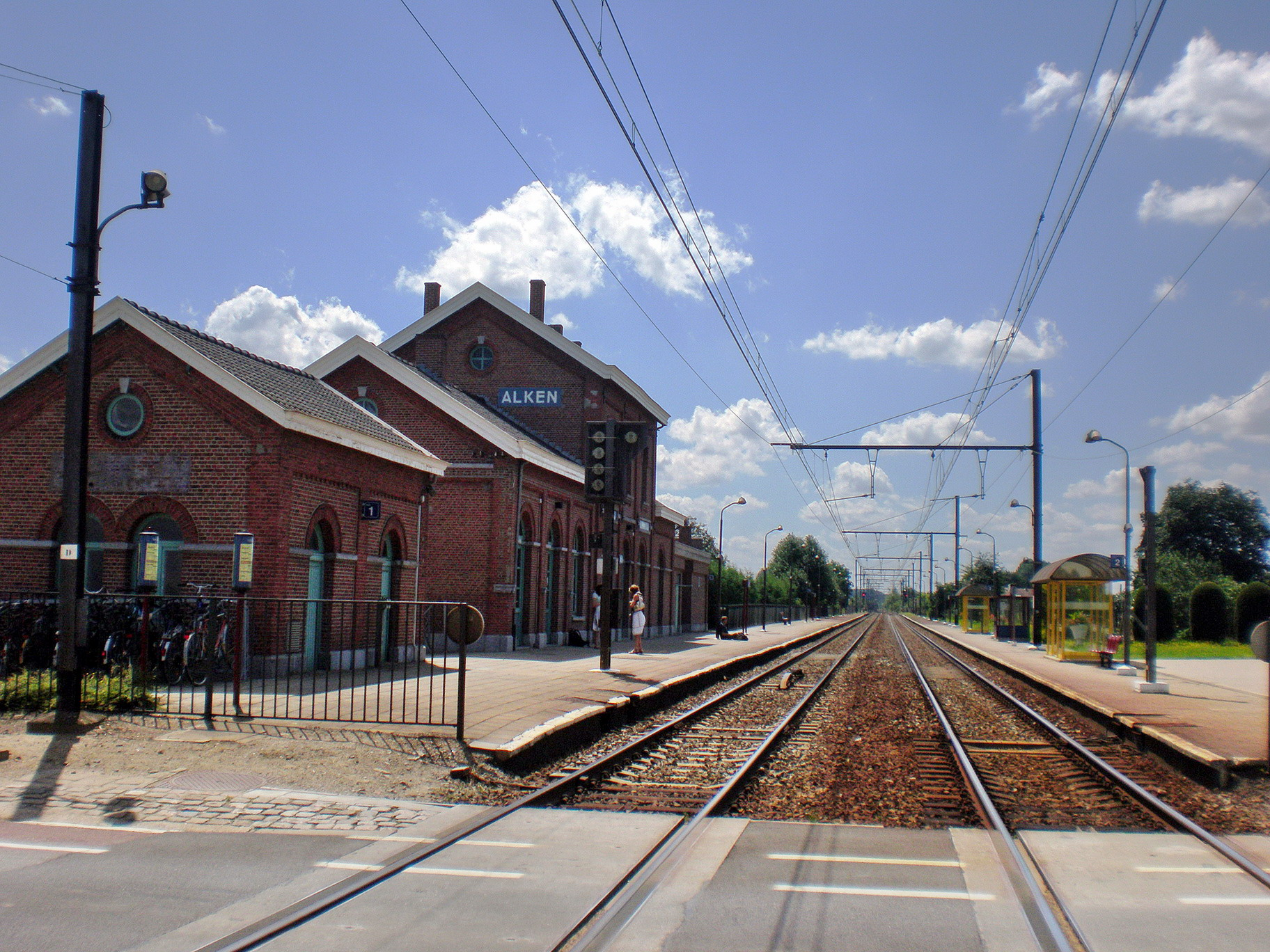
- Alken railway station

General information
- Location: Alken, Limburg; Belgium
- Coordinates: 50°53′11″N 5°17′31″E
- System: Railway Station
- Owner: Infrabel
- Operator: National Railway Company of Belgium
- Line: 21 (Landen-Hasselt)
- Platforms: 2
- Tracks: 2

Other information
- Station code: FAK
- Website: http://www.belgianrail.be/en/stations-and-train/search-a-station/3/alken.aspx

History
- Opened: 8 December 1847; 178 years ago

Passengers
- 2014: 499
Location
- Location within Belgium

Alken is a railway station in the municipality of Alken, Limburg, Belgium. The station opened on 8 December 1847 and is located on line 21. The train services are operated by National Railway Company of Belgium (NMBS).

The first station building opened in 1847. The current building dates from 1903.

== Train services ==
The station is served by the following services:

- Intercity services (IC-03) Blankenberge - Bruges - Ghent - Brussels - Leuven - Hasselt - Genk

Preceding station	NMBS/SNCB	Following station
Sint-Truiden towards Blankenberge or Knokke	IC 03	Hasselt towards Genk
