= Mahmood Mosque, Zurich =

Mosque in Zurich, Switzerland

Mahmood Mosque
- Mahmud Moschee
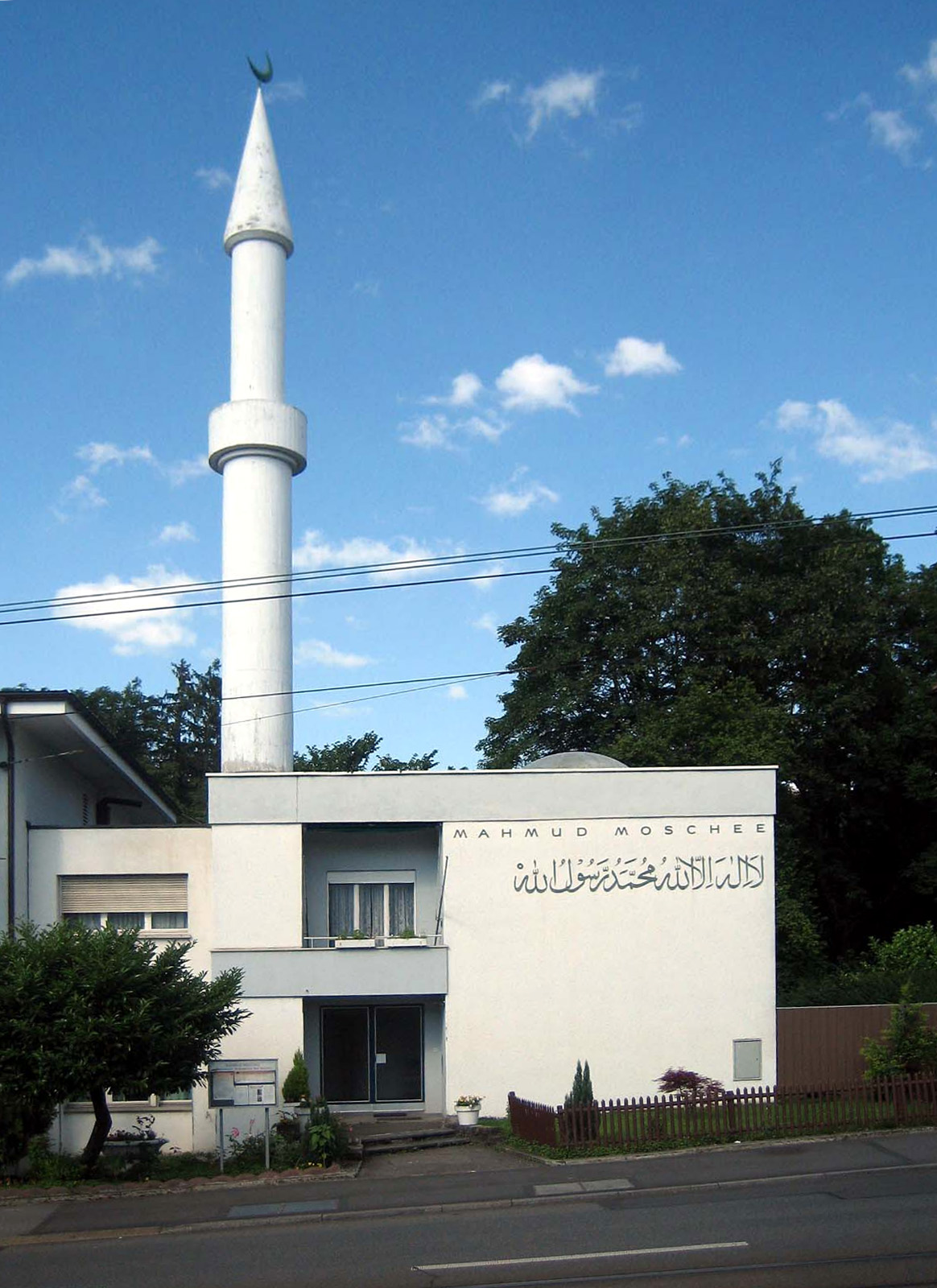

- Location within Canton of Zürich

Religion
- Affiliation: Ahmadiyya

Location
- Location: Zurich, Switzerland
- Interactive map of Mahmood Mosque
- Coordinates: 47°21′18.5″N 8°34′29.8″E

Architecture
- Type: Mosque
- Completed: 1963

Specifications
- Minaret: 1
- Minaret height: 18 m

The Mahmood Mosque, (German: Mahmud Moschee) situated in Forchstrasse, Zurich, is the first purpose-built mosque in Switzerland. It is owned and run by the Ahmadiyya Muslim Community. The mosque has a minaret, the new construction of which is now banned in Switzerland by popular vote.

The foundation stone was laid with a stone from the wall of the Mubarak Mosque, India by Amatul Hafeez Begum, daughter of the founder of the Ahmadiyya Muslim Community, Mirza Ghulam Ahmad on August 25, 1962. It was a sign of the emancipation of Muslim women, both then and now. The mosque was inaugurated on June 22, 1963, by the then President of the 17th session of the United Nations General Assembly, Sir Muhammad Zafarullah Khan, in the presence of the Mayor of Zurich, Dr. Emil Landolt. The mission in Switzerland was led by Mushtaq Ahmad Bajwa from June 1962 until January 1975.

== History ==
In the post-war period, Islam came to Switzerland through the Ahmadiyya Muslim Community in 1946. On October 13, 1946, three missionaries arrived in Zurich. The three missionaries, Sheikh Nasir Ahmad, Abdul Latif and Ghulam Ahmad Bashir, were actually appointed to open an Islamic mission in Germany, but entry opportunities to Germany were almost impossible during the first post-war years. After a while, Abdul Latif and Ghulam Ahmad Bashir travelled to the Netherlands. Sheikh Nasir Ahmad (Head of Missionary 1946 to 1962 and 1997 to 2000 in Switzerland) was commissioned to further expand the Mission Office in Switzerland, which had already been widely publicized in the press.

Between 1946 and 1962, three important priority tasks were accomplished in Switzerland. The first edition of the Arabic-German edition of the Quran appeared in 1954. Second, the publication and foundation of the magazine "DER ISLAM". Third, the construction of a mosque in Switzerland.

== See also ==
- Islam in Switzerland
- List of mosques in Europe
