= Ahmadiyya in Morocco =

Islamic movement

The Ahmadiyya movement is a small but growing religious group in Morocco with only about five hundred adherents as of 2013.

== History ==
The Ahmadiyya was officially established in Morocco in the early 1990s. the number of adherents of this Islamic group has increased over the years, but very slowly. In 2013, there have been an estimated 500 Ahmadis in Morocco, although the number may be much higher since some Ahmadis prefer not to openly reveal their adherence to the movement to protect themselves from persecution.

== Organizations ==
Moroccan Ahmadis do not have an official place for them to practice or teach their faith, although an increasing number of schools are reportedly owned by Ahmadis, especially in the cities of Salé, Casablanca, Meknes and Tangier.

== See also ==
- Islam in Morocco
- Religion in Morocco
- Ahmadiyya in Algeria
- Ahmadiyya in Egypt
