= Ahmadiyya in Poland =

Islamic movement

The Ahmadiyya Muslim community (Polish: Stowarzyszenie Muzułmańskie Ahmadiyya) is an Islamic branch in Poland, under the spiritual leadership of the caliph, Mirza Masroor Ahmad. It was registered in Poland on December 3, 1990, and since then has the status of a religious association in the territory of the Republic of Poland. In 1991, the Community purchased a detached house with a plot of land in Włochy, Warsaw. The house was converted into a Mission House and mosque premises. The community has around 100 members in Poland

The history of the Community dates back to the interwar period. In 1937, the first missionary, Ayyaz Khan, came to Warsaw with two co-workers of Hungarian citizenship. He came under the direct command of the spiritual leader of the Worldwide Head of Ahmadiyya Muslim Community, Mirza Bashir-ud-Din Mahmoud Ahmad. The reason for sending the missionary to Poland was a personal visit in 1937, to the central headquarters of the Ahmadiyya Muslim World Community, in Qadian, India, of the Chief Mufti of Poland, Dr. Jakub Szynkiewicz, head of the Muslim Religious Union in Poland. The purpose of the visit was to interest the Second Caliph in building a mosque in Warsaw and to raise funds for this purpose. The Second Caliph allocated a certain amount to the construction of a mosque in Warsaw and delegated Ayyaz Khan, who had been working in Hungary for two years, to Poland.

The outbreak of the Second World War made it impossible to achieve this goal. The hostilities forced the missionary Ayyaz Khan to leave Warsaw and evacuate from Poland. He went to Budapest with the military, government officials, ambassadors and others. He continued his missionary activities in the capital of Hungary.

The resumption of the activities of the Association was possible only after the fall of communism in Poland, in 1990. This year, another missionary, Hamid Karim Mahmud, came to Warsaw, who completed the interrupted activities of his predecessor regarding the legalization of the Association's activities in the Republic of Poland. Ahmadiyya Muslim Community was granted the status of a Muslim Religious Union in 1990. It continued its activities for the next 16 years, until 2006.

In 2007, the spiritual leader of the Ahmadiyya Muslim Community, Mirza Masroor Ahmad, decided to change the missionary in Poland by appointing a German citizen, Munir Munawar Ahmad. Until now, he is a missionary and Imam of the Association.

== See also ==
- Islam in Poland
