= Ahmadiyya in Canada =

Islamic movement

Ahmadiyya in Canada is a religious sect within the Islamic community of Canada. The earliest known Ahmadis visits of the country were back in 1923. Later, Ahmadis came to Canada from various parts of the world, in particular from Pakistan, as a result of their declaration as a Non-Muslim Community by the Pakistani Government legislations in 1974 and again in 1984. The Community was first officially registered in Canada in 1966 in Ontario as the "Ahmadiyya Movement in Islam (Ont) Inc." and the first missionary assigned to Canada was Maulana Syed Mansoor Bashir Sahib. The first missionary assigned to Western Canada was Maulana Ali Haider Upal sahib Shaheed, who was appointed in Vancouver in 1982, and later, stationed in Calgary and in Saskatoon. As the only missionary stationed in Western Canada, he served the Ahmadiyya Jama'ats in Vancouver, Calgary, Edmonton, Saskatoon, Regina, Lloydminster, and Winnipeg between 1982 and 1986.

Ahmadis in Canada number about 25,000 or 2.5% of the total Muslim population in Canada, according to a 2012 survey estimate, with most of them from Pakistan and smaller numbers from Syria, Bangladesh, Mauritius, Fiji, and Africa.
