= Ahmadiyya in Liberia =

Islamic movement

Ahmadiyya is an Islamic religious movement in Liberia, founded in the year 1956, during the era of the Second Caliphate. Approximately, up to 30,000 Ahmadi Muslims live in Liberia.

== History ==
The earliest known record of an Ahmadiyya missionary in Liberia dates back to the 1950s, when Mufti Muhammad Sadiq, a missionary based in Sierra Leone at that time, visited Liberia in the spring of 1952. Staying in the country for a period of one month, Sadiq took the opportunity to meet the President of Liberia, William Tubman and presented an English translation of the Quran as well as other Islamic literature. However, the Ahmadiyya movement was first established four later, by Muhammad Ishaq Sufi. As per instruction of Caliph Mirza Basheer-ud-Din Mahmood Ahmad, Sufi arrived in the capital Monrovia on 6 January 1956. A year later, on 12 June 1957, Sufi met with President Tubman as well, this time in his presidential palace.

=== Journeys by caliphs ===
As part of his tour of West Africa during the early period of his reign, the third caliph of the Ahmadiyya Muslim Community, Mirza Nasir Ahmad, visited Liberia. Invited by President Tubman, the caliph arrived at the Roberts International Airport, just outside the nation's capital, Monrovia, for a two-day visit on April 29, 1970. Accompanied by a special representative of the president, Colonel Henri R. Gobson, and also a number of Governors, the caliph journeyed to the president's Executive Mansion and conferred in a private audience with the president. Later, the Ahmadiyya mission invited the caliph for a dinner, at the now defunct Ducor Hotel. The following day, he returned to a dinner at the Executive Mansion tendered by the president in his honor, during which the president described him as "one of the greatest leaders in Islam". On May 1, 1970, the caliph left the country.

The fourth caliph, Mirza Tahir Ahmad, visited Liberia between January 31 and February 2, 1988.

== Ahmadiyya clinics in Liberia ==
- Ahmadiyya Muslim Clinic in Sinkor, Monrovia.
- Ahmadiyya Muslim Clinic in Sayon Town, Monrovia.
- Ahmadiyya Muslim Clinic in Tubmanburg, Bomi County
- Ahmadiyya Muslim Clinic in Ganta, Nimba County
- Ahmadiyya Muslim Clinic in Kakata, Margibi County

== Ahmadiyya Mosques in Liberia ==
- Baitul Mujeeb Mosque in Monrovia. It was originally built in 1986 but suffered fire damage in 1996 during the First Liberian Civil War. It was reconstructed on July 7, 2000.
- Ahmadiyya Mosque in Tubmanburg, Bomi County.
- Ahmadiyya Mosque in Teh, Grand Cape Mount County
- Ahmadiyya Mission House in Gohn Town, Grand Cape Mount County
- Ahmadiyya Mission House and Mosque in Tiene Town, Grand Cape Mount County
- Ahmadiyya Mosque in Nagbena, Grand Cape Mount County.
- Ahmadiyya Mission House and Mosque in Ganta, Nimba County
- Ahmadiyya Mission House and Mosque in Kakata, Margibi County
- Ahmadiyya Central Library in Monrovia inaugurated in 2008

== Ahmadiyya Schools in Liberia ==
- Masroor Ahmadiyya Elementary, Junior & Senior High School in Tiene Town, Grand Cape Mount County.
- Shah Taj Ahmadiyya Elementary, Junior & Senior High School was started in 1996 by Mr.M.A.Bajwah, the former Amir and Missionary In charge, Liberia with the approval of Hadhrat Mirza Tahir Ahmad, 4th Caliph of Ahmadiyya Muslim Jama'at. Mr. Mansoor Ahmad Nasir is the first principal of the school, who is in office since 1997 to date. The school is presently located in Tweh Farm, Monrovia.
