= Shia Islam in Egypt =

Aspect of Egypt's Muslim demographic

Shia Islam in Egypt refers to the community of Shia Muslims living in Egypt.

== History and culture ==
Shia Islam has historical roots in Egypt dating back to the Fatimid Caliphate, an Isma'ili Shia dynasty that ruled Egypt from 969 to 1171. The Fatimids established Cairo as their capital and significantly influenced Egypt's cultural identity. They also founded Al-Azhar University in 970, originally as a Shia mosque and center for learning, making it one of the oldest continuously operating universities globally.

However, Egypt's general population remained predominantly Sunni before, during, and after Fatimid rule. Isma'ili Shiism was primarily practiced by Egypt's ruling elites rather than by the general populace.

== Population estimates ==
Estimates of Egypt's Shia Muslim population vary significantly. Shia activists claim their numbers exceed one million, whereas Salafist groups suggest only a few thousand. According to The Economist, estimates range widely from 50,000 to one million. Minority Rights Group International places the number between 800,000 and two million, out of Egypt's total population of approximately 90 million.

== Persecution ==
Egypt's small Shia minority experiences frequent harassment and suspicion from state authorities. Human rights groups, including the United Nations, Human Rights Watch, and Amnesty International, have documented systematic mistreatment of Shia Muslims in Egypt, noting that they often face arbitrary arrests purportedly for security concerns, accompanied by abusive treatment targeting their religious identity. In December 2012, a report by the UNHCR highlighted that Egyptian Shias remained unable to openly perform their religious rituals and continued facing legal action on charges such as blasphemy. The U.S. Commission on International Religious Freedom consistently categorizes Egypt as a "country of particular concern," citing systematic violations of religious freedom.

Egyptian authorities have intervened repeatedly to prevent Shia religious observances. In December 2011, security forces stopped Shia worshippers from observing Ashura at Cairo's El-Hussein Mosque, forcibly dispersing participants after Salafi groups accused them of performing rituals deemed offensive. In May 2012, Al-Azhar Grand Imam Ahmed El-Tayeb convened Islamist scholars, Muslim Brotherhood representatives, and Salafists, collectively expressing rejection of perceived efforts to spread Shia Islam within Egypt.

On 23 June 2013, following sustained anti-Shia rhetoric by local Salafi elements, a mob of several hundred Sunni residents in the village of Abu Mussalam in Giza, attacked the home of Shia cleric Hasan Shahhata, killing him and three of his followers and publicly dragging their bodies through the streets. Reports noted that police failed to intervene during the incident. Amnesty International called upon Egyptian authorities to initiate an independent investigation and publicly denounce violence and incitement against Shia Muslims.

As of 2017, non-governmental organizations continued reporting anti-Shia violence and propaganda. Shia Egyptians reportedly face societal discrimination, denial of basic services, and frequent derogatory slurs. Anti-Shia sentiment is also perpetuated through educational institutions, with clerics educated at Al-Azhar University openly labelling Shia adherents as infidels and advocating their social marginalization.

== Notable people ==
Mohammad Reza Pahlavi, was the last monarch of Iran. He obtained Egyptian citizenship in 1979, and died in Cairo in 1980.

== Shi'a organizations ==
Below are a few Egyptian Shia organizations:

- Congregation of Ahl Al-Bayt, headed by Mohamed El-Derini.
- Shia Current, headed by Mohamed Ghoneim
