= Alken, Belgium =

Alken
- Municipality
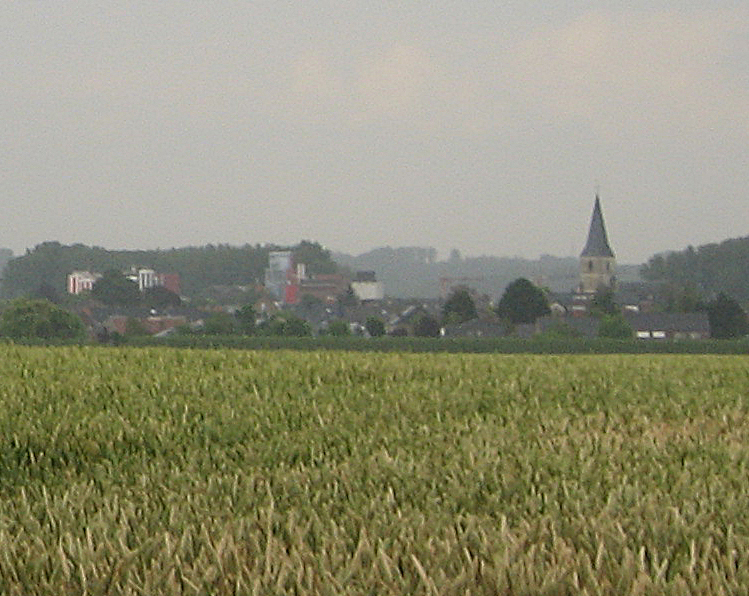
- Brewery of Alken (left) and St-Aldegondis Church (right)

- Flag Coat of arms

- Location of Alken in Limburg
- Interactive map of Alken
- Location in Belgium
- Coordinates: 50°52′34″N 5°18′28″E
- Country: Belgium
- Community: Flemish Community
- Region: Flemish Region
- Province: Limburg
- Arrondissement: Tongeren

Government
  - Mayor: Marc Penxten (N-VA)
  - Governing parties: Groen and N-VA

Area
  - Total: 28.24 km^{2} (10.90 sq mi)

Population (2022-01-01)
  - Total: 11,757
  - Density: 416.3/km^{2} (1,078/sq mi)
- Postal codes: 3570
- NIS code: 73001
- Area codes: 011
- Website: (in Dutch) www.alken.be

Alken (Dutch pronunciation: [ˈɑlkə(n)]; Limburgish: Alleke [ˈɑləkə]) is a municipality located in Belgian province of Limburg. The community lies just south of the provincial capital of Hasselt, in the Hesbaye region. Alken has about 11,300 residents, which gives the village a larger population than the nearby small cities of Borgloon and Herk-de-Stad.

== History ==
Alken appeared for the first time in history in 1066 under the name Alleche. Since 1180, the official name of the municipality is Alken but 'Alleke' is still often used by locals.

Alken was an enclave of the Bishopric of Liège surrounded by the county of Loon. Many Prince Bishops had a summer residence here.

== Village centers ==
The municipality has no districts. But has 3 village centers or major neighborhoods. Alken-Centre, Sint-Joris (St. George) and Terkoest.

Alken-Centre is located in the east of the municipality, neighboring Hasselt and Wellen. The parish is dedicated to St. Aldegondis and it is the oldest parish in Alken. The city hall, the CPAS, most shops and institutions are located here.

Sint-Joris (St. George) is located south of Alken, neighboring Sint-Truiden and Nieuwerkerken. The parish is dedicated to St. George Patron Saint, known from the story of Saint George and the dragon.

Terkoest located in the northwest of the town, neighboring Hasselt and Nieuwerkerken. The name Terkoest comes from an old Dutch word for marshy areas.

A fourth neighborhood in Alken grew around the station, though this station area is not developed into a real village. The station was closed for a while and the local school closed.

== Sights ==
Alken is best known for its brewery and the beer Cristal Alken brewed there, but also for its many castles, churches, chapels and water mills. In recreational terms, one can indulge in the leisure park "De Alk" between large and the small Herk (river), one can walk in the Mombeek-valley and explore the well-equipped bicycle network.

Alken is located in the most productive fruit cultivation area of Belgium and the area is famous for its blossoming fruit trees filling the landscape.

== Transport ==
The municipality is served by Alken railway station.

== Gallery ==
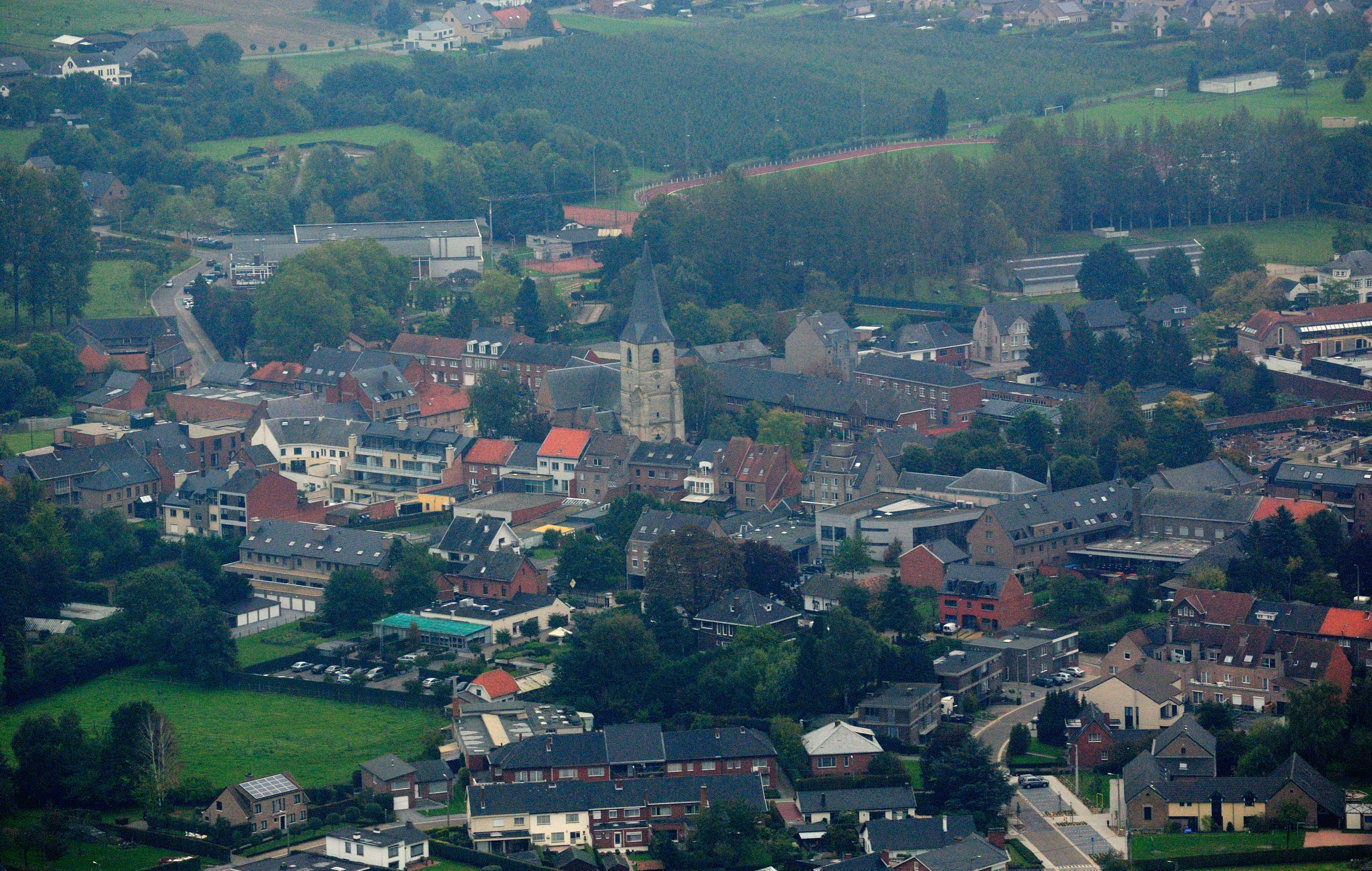
Aerial view of Alken

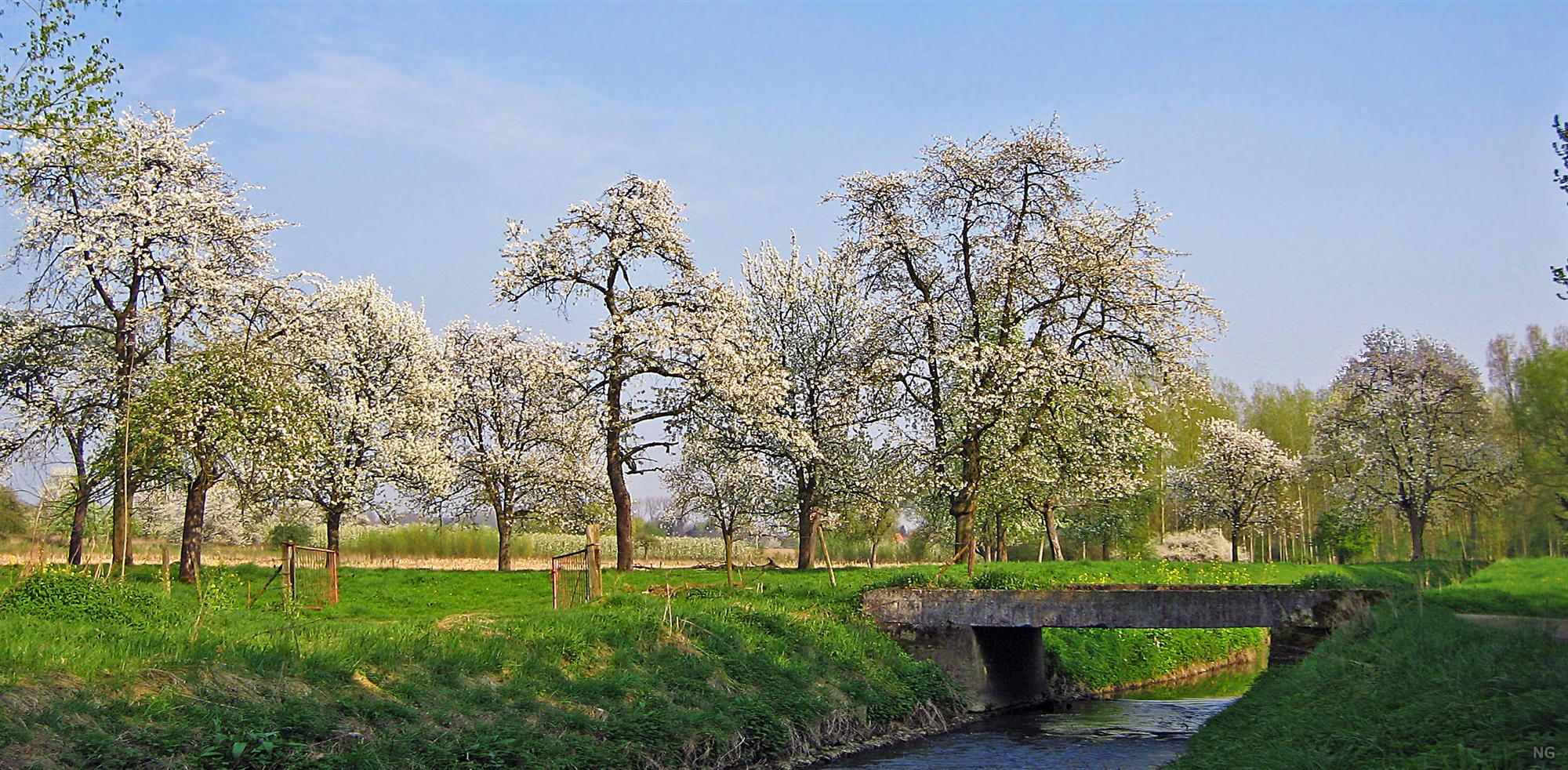
The Herk

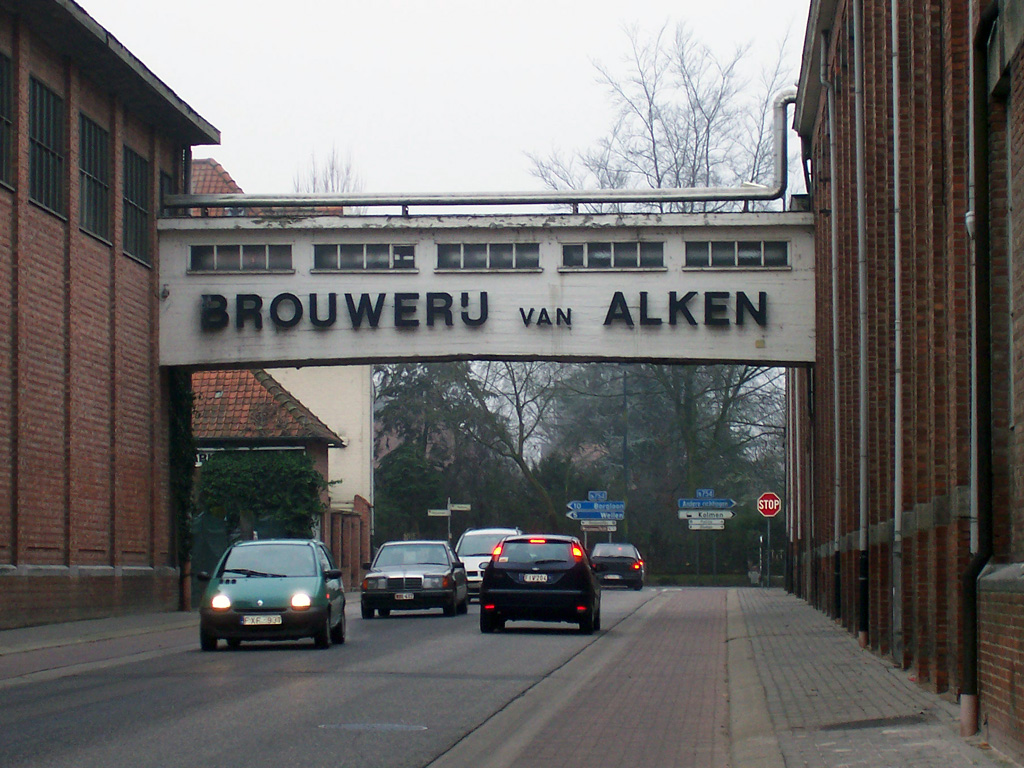
Brewery Alken-Maes
