= Barbara Hofmann =

Swiss humanitarian and charity worker

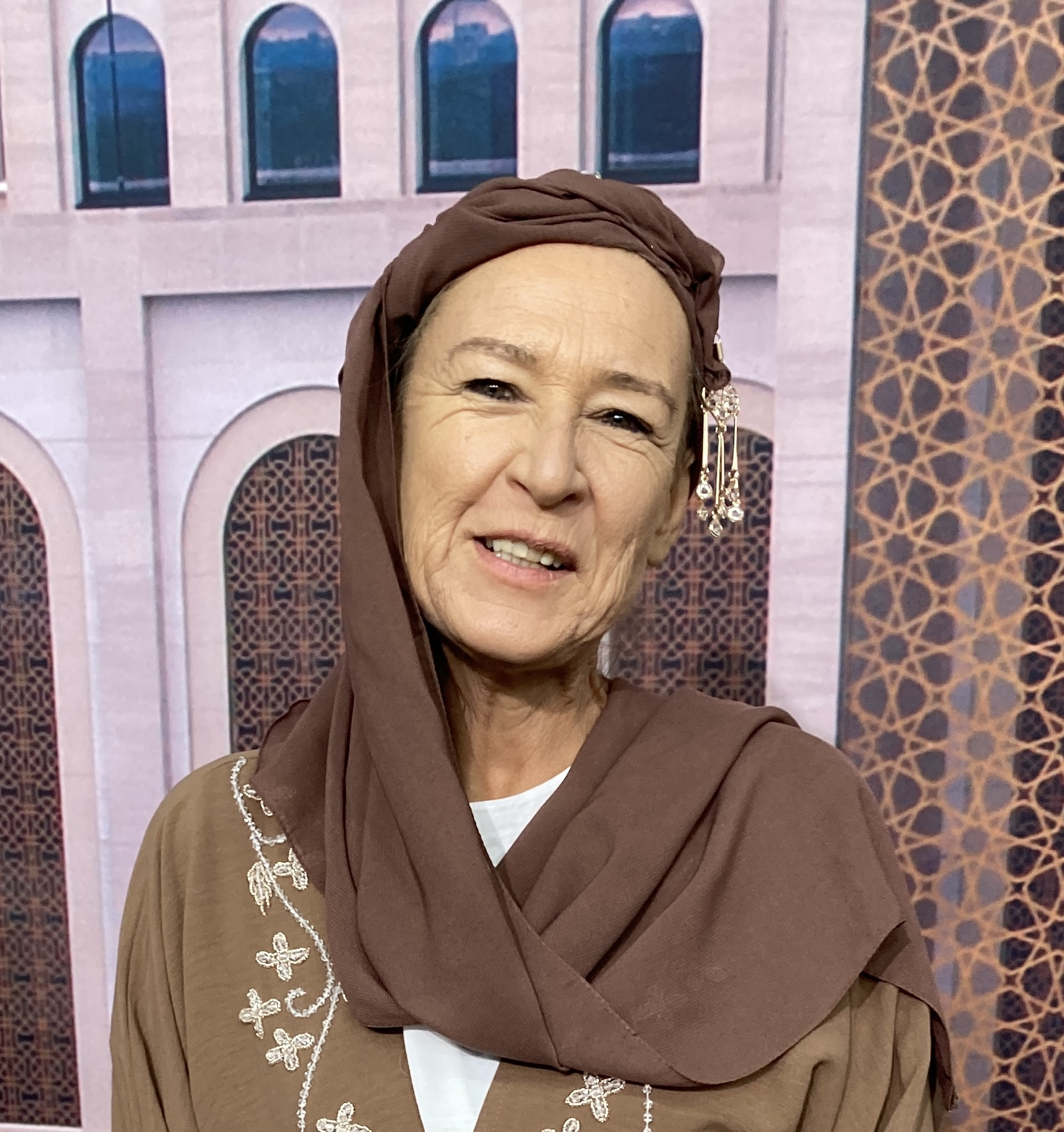
Barbara Hofmann after receiving the Ahmadiyya Muslim Peace Prize (March 2023)

Barbara Karoline Hofmann (born 8 March 1962) is a Swiss humanitarian and charity worker and is the Founder and CEO of ASEM (Association en faveur de l'Enfance Mozambicaine - The Association for the Children of Mozambique), a non-profit organization based in Beira in Mozambique. Hofmann founded ASEM in Switzerland in 1991, following which in 1999 she founded ASEM-Mozambique in Mozambique itself. ASEM is a charitable organisation dedicated to raising funds and awareness about the plight of the children and young adults of Mozambique and to help promote their socio-economic integration into Mozambican society.

== Biography ==
Hofmann was born in Affoltern am Albis in Switzerland in 1962. She attended Collège Calvin and after trained in business administration and finance following which she had a seven-year career in various banks and multinational companies. In 1989 she was working for a large charity in Beira in Mozambique where she saw for herself the result of the Mozambican War of Independence (1964-1974) and the Mozambican Civil War (1977-1994), both of which lead to great poverty for many people in the country. What she saw decided her to devote her life to helping the orphans in Mozambique.

In 1990 Hofmann commenced negotiations with the Mozambican Minister for Social Welfare, Education, Health and other relevant local authorities with the intention of obtaining land in Beira on which to build a centre for child war victims, orphans, abandoned children and those with HIV/AIDS. Her proposal, however, was not accepted as her plan was not supported by any organization, so Hofmann returned home to Switzerland where she sold all her possessions and two months later founded ASEM Switzerland.

On completion of successful renegotiations she opened the first Home for war orphans in 1992, firstly in tents, which provided food, education and accommodation for 300 children orphaned as a result of the conflicts. In 1991 Hofmann founded ASEM Switzerland through which voluntary workers collected essential resources to transfer to Beira. ASEM Switzerland was followed in 1995 by the setting up of the support organisations ASEM Portugal and ASEM New York, with ASEM Mozambique and ASEM Italy following in 1999, while in 2005 ASEM Canada and in 2016 Friends of ASEM USA were started. ASEM Mozambique will only employ local staff, many of whom are former orphans who having completed their education and training in ASEM schools use their skills for the benefit of ASEM, enabling other children in similar circumstances to also find a way out of poverty. Several children helped by Hofmann have gone on to receive university degrees, while others have studied in other countries, obtained jobs and started families.

Hofmann caught malaria in January 2001 and for more than a month she was in a coma on a hospital ward in Johannesburg where she received dialysis and intravenous therapy, among other life-saving treatments. Although she survived the illness her liver, lungs and kidneys took nearly five years to recover. During her absence the local staff at ASEM-Mozambique ensured that the work of the centre continued.

Since 2005, more than 300 children have been living in the two centres — Gorongoza and Vilankulo — in Beira, while more than 20,000 children and adolescents have received an education at ASEM's free schools along with other benefits.

ASEM Mozambique consists of four physical school centres (Pre-K through high school) providing food, education, and skill training to over 6,000 children and young adults in the Sofala region of central Mozambique: these are the Manga, Macurungo, and Gorongoza (currently closed) schools in Beira, while the Majianza school, which also has a preschool, is situated in Vilankulo.

Today Hofmann works for ASEM as a volunteer, dealing with staff training, psychological support for children and young people, fundraising and public relations, representing ASEM in meetings with governmental and non-governmental agencies, both nationally and internationally, financial administration and general supervision of the ASEM structures.

== Honours and awards ==
- Hofmann is the recipient of the Ahmadiyya Muslim Peace Prize for 2019. She was presented with the Award by Mirza Masroor Ahmad at the Baitul Futuh Mosque in London on 4 March 2023.
- the "Chevalier de l'Ordre National de Mérite" by French President Jacques Chirac, 1997
- an award from the Aeschenkollegium Basel, 1997
- the "SCUDO d'ARGENTO" of the Istituto Scudi di San Martino, Italy 2000
- Blue Drop Group's "Mimosa d'Oro" in Palermo, Italy, 2002
- nomination "Woman of the Year" by the Government of Val d'Aosta, Italy, 2002
- appointment as "Peace Messenger" by the International Center for Peace between Nations of Assisi, Italy, 2003
- the "Rose of Sympathy" by the City Council of Rome, Italy, 2003
- honorary citizenship in Limena, Italy, 2003
- honorary citizenship in San Giorgio in Bosco, Italy, 2003
- the first prize of the city of Ostia, Italy, for her book "Um dia sera poesia", 2007
- appointment of "Peace Messenger" by the Universal Peace Federation and the Federazione Donne per la Pace nel mondo, Padova, Italy, 2009
- the "Award of Goodness" from the National Union of the Knights of Italy, Padova, Italy, 2013
- THE ONE International Humanitarian Award 2014, Rotray Club District 3450, Hong Kong
- honorary citizenship in Selvazzano Dentro (PD), Italy, 2017
