= TWB =

TWB may refer to:

- Teachers Without Borders
- Translators Without Borders
- The Washington Ballet
- Toowoomba City Aerodrome, Queensland, Australia (IATA code TWB)
- Trinity Airways, by ICAO airline designator
- Tweedbank railway station, Scottish Borders, UK (station code TWB)
