= Oheneba =

Oheneba is a regal rank given to both female or male child of a king or chief. It is the equivalent of prince or princess (from Latin princeps, meaning principal citizen).

Most often, the term has been used for the child of a king, or for the daughter of a king.

The twi word derives, via the twi and akan word ohene, meaning "the chief or king" and ''ba'' also via a twi and akan word, meaning child, with the two meaning the ''chief's child'' or the ''king's child''.

== Oheneba as a courtesy title ==
In the Akan tradition and Akan chieftaincy, the child of a king or chief does not ascend the throne when his or her father dies due to their Matrilineal inheritance and succession. However the children are given the title Oheneba which means the ''chief's child'' or the ''king's child''. The title is maintained even when their fathers (the king) passes on.

Notable people with the title Oheneba;

- Oheneba Lesley Akyaa Opoku Ware (Daughter of Otumfuo Opoku Ware II, the 15th King of the Ashanti Kingdom (Asantehene)
- Oheneba Adusei Poku (Son of Otumfuo Opoku Ware II, the 15th King of the Ashanti Kingdom (Asantehene)
- Oheneba Mensah Bonsu (Hiahene) (Caretaker and Uncle of Otumfuo Nana Osei Tutu II)

== Oheneba as a given name ==
Oheneba as a name; Oheneba can be a given name of a male child in Akan ethnic group to signify how precious the child is in the Akan parlance.

Notable people with the given name;

- Oheneba Boachie-Adjei
- Oheneba Kow Aduako Richardson
- Oheneba Krabea
