= Opoku Ware =

Opoku Ware can refer to:

- Opoku Ware I (1700–1750), Asantahene, ruler of the Ashanti kingdom in Ghana
- Opoku Ware II (1919-1999), 15th Asantahene
- Lesley Akyaa Opoku Ware (graduated 1981), Ghanaian ambassador and physician
- Opoku Ware School, school in Ghana
