= Voice of Islam Radio =

Islamic radio station in the UK

- United Kingdom

Programming
- Language: English
- Format: Religious radio

Ownership
- Owner: Ahmadiyya Muslim Community

History
- First air date: February 7, 2016

Links
- Website: voiceofislam.co.uk

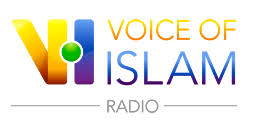
Voice of Islam Radio Logo

Voice of Islam is an Islamic radio station run by the Ahmadiyya Muslim Community across the United Kingdom on its purpose to promote the teachings of Islam, those of peace, love and compassion for all of mankind. It operates from the Baitul Futuh Mosque in London, the largest mosque in Western Europe and was launched on the 7 of February 2016. Since its inception in 2016, it has been broadcast 24 hours a day, seven days a week on Digital Audio Broadcasting (DAB), initially in London then launch across the country in Manchester, Bradford, Edinburgh, Glasgow, Leeds, Cardiff, Birmingham, Coventry, Londonderry and Belfast. The radio is also accessed through livestream on the VOI App, TuneIn Radio and YouTube and through the stream on their official website.

== Inauguration ==
The station was inaugurated by Mirza Masroor Ahmad, the head & the 5th Caliph of the Ahmadiyya Muslim Community on 7 February 2016.

== Programming ==
The station hosts a wide range of guests on different shows, reflecting the span of topics covered by their shows over the years. Although the station has an Islamic base, they have covered a wide range of affairs intertwined with Islam. The radio broadcasts, live as well as recorded content, cover a variety of subjects. These range from discussions on day-to-day news and history to matters of faiths, and sometimes poetry, policies or mental health.

Significant guests have been interviewed on the radio station, such as professor Terry Lamb, Gerald Oppenheim, Lisa Bortolotti, Chairman of OPA, Swati Dhingra, Stephen Hoskins, URI Europe Coordinator Ms. Karimah Stauch, Dr. Gabriella Day, ACP member Rachel Melville-Thomas, director of the Progress Educational Trust Sarah Norcross, member of the Circadian Sleep Disorders Network, Director of International Development at LSRI Séverine Deneulin, BFMS Director of Communications Kevin Felstead, BPA Chairman, CIDT’s Professor Philip Dearden, Dr William Van Gordon, psychotherapist Islam Al-Aqeel, WAY's Chief Executive Rebecca Cooper, Young Adult Carer and a student Halima and CSM Family Support Worker Joe Collins, Lara Atwood, Mr Zaher Toumi, Fabio Ghironi, Ross Morrison McGill, Professor Michael W. Charney, Paula Chadwick, Mohammed Amin, and Professor Rebecca Gibbons, between others.

== See also ==
- Ahmadiyya in the United Kingdom
- MTA1 World
- MTA International
- Islamic radio
