= Ahmadiyya Muslim Peace Prize =

Peace Prize

Ahmadiyya Muslim Prize for the Advancement of Peace
- Type: Peace Prize
- Awarded for: In recognition of an individual's or an organisation's contribution for the advancement of the cause of peace.
- Venue: Jalsa Salana United Kingdom
- Country: United Kingdom
- Presented by: Ahmadiyya Muslim Peace Prize Committee
- Established: 2009
- First award: 2009
- Final award: 2026

Highlights
- Total recipients: 15

The Ahmadiyya Muslim Peace Prize, formally the Ahmadiyya Muslim Prize for the Advancement of Peace, is awarded annually "in recognition of an individual’s or an organisation’s contribution for the advancement of the cause of peace". The prize was first launched in 2009 by the Ahmadiyya Muslim Peace Prize Committee under the directive of the caliph of the Ahmadiyya Muslim Community, Mirza Masroor Ahmad.

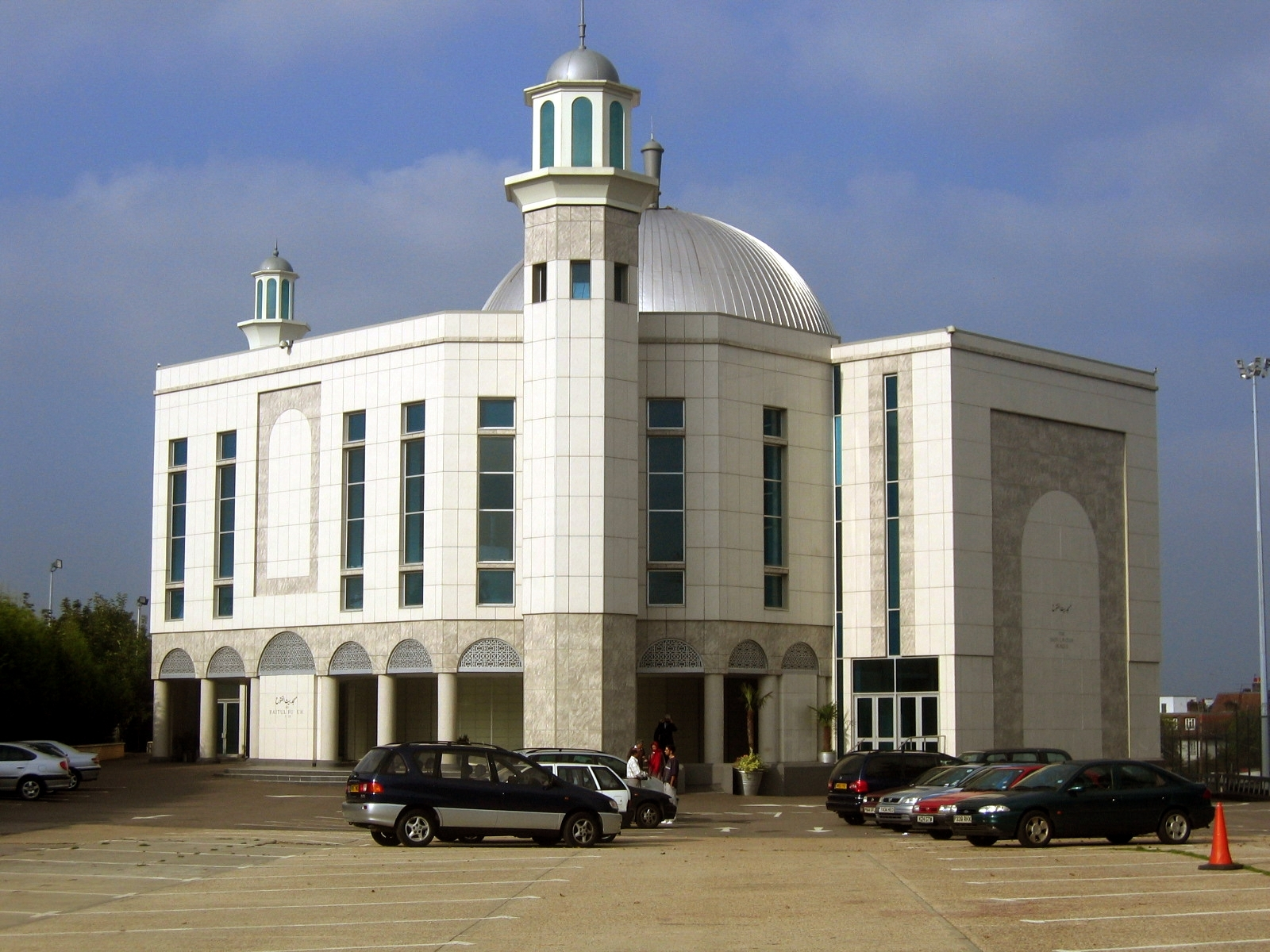
The Ahmadiyya Muslim Peace Prize is presented at the annual Peace Symposium, held here at one of Western Europe's largest mosques, the Baitul Futuh Mosque in London.

The Prize is announced annually at the United Kingdom Annual Convention and is presented the following year at the National Peace Symposium held at the Baitul Futuh Mosque in London. The Prize includes a monetary sum, which is normally set at 10,000 pounds sterling.

== Recipients ==
Year	Recipient	Country	Rationale
2009	Lord Eric Avebury	United Kingdom	"For his continued efforts to promote human rights across the world"
2010	Abdus Sattar Edhi	Pakistan	"In recognition of his outstanding work for social welfare and humanitarian relief"
2011	SOS Children's Villages UK	United Kingdom	"For its continued efforts to alleviating the suffering of orphaned and abandoned children around the world and towards fulfilling its vision of ‘a loving home for every child’"
2012	Oheneba Boachie-Adjei	Ghana	"In recognition of his outstanding work in the promotion of peace through his life-changing medical work that has provided hope and a future for thousands of people in the developing world"
2013	Magnus MacFarlane-Barrow	United Kingdom	"In recognition of his outstanding efforts to provide food and education to hundreds of thousands of children in the developing world"
2014	Sindhutai Sapkal	India	"For she has devoted her entire life for orphans"
2015	Hadeel Qasim Hussein Al-Okbi	Iraq	"In recognition of her outstanding efforts for helping child refugees forced to flee areas such as Iraq due to conflict."
2016	Setsuko Thurlow	Japan	"For her excellent efforts to disarm nuclear weapons."
2017	Leonid Roshal	Russia	"For his remarkable services to children in war torn areas of the world"
2018	Fred Mednick	United States	"In recognition of his efforts to provide unfettered access to education to some of the most neglected parts of the world"
2019	Barbara Hofmann	Switzerland	"For her outstanding humanitarian efforts in Mozambique from 1989 and onwards."
2020	Adi Patricia Roche	Ireland	"For her tireless efforts in advocating for nuclear disarmament and supporting victims of the Chernobyl disaster".
2021	Jose Andres	USA	
2022	Tadatoshi Akiba	Japan	"For his passionate activism for nuclear disarmament around the world".
2023	David Spurdle	United Kingdom	
