= Leonid Roshal =

Russian pediatrician (born 1933)

- Леонид Рошаль
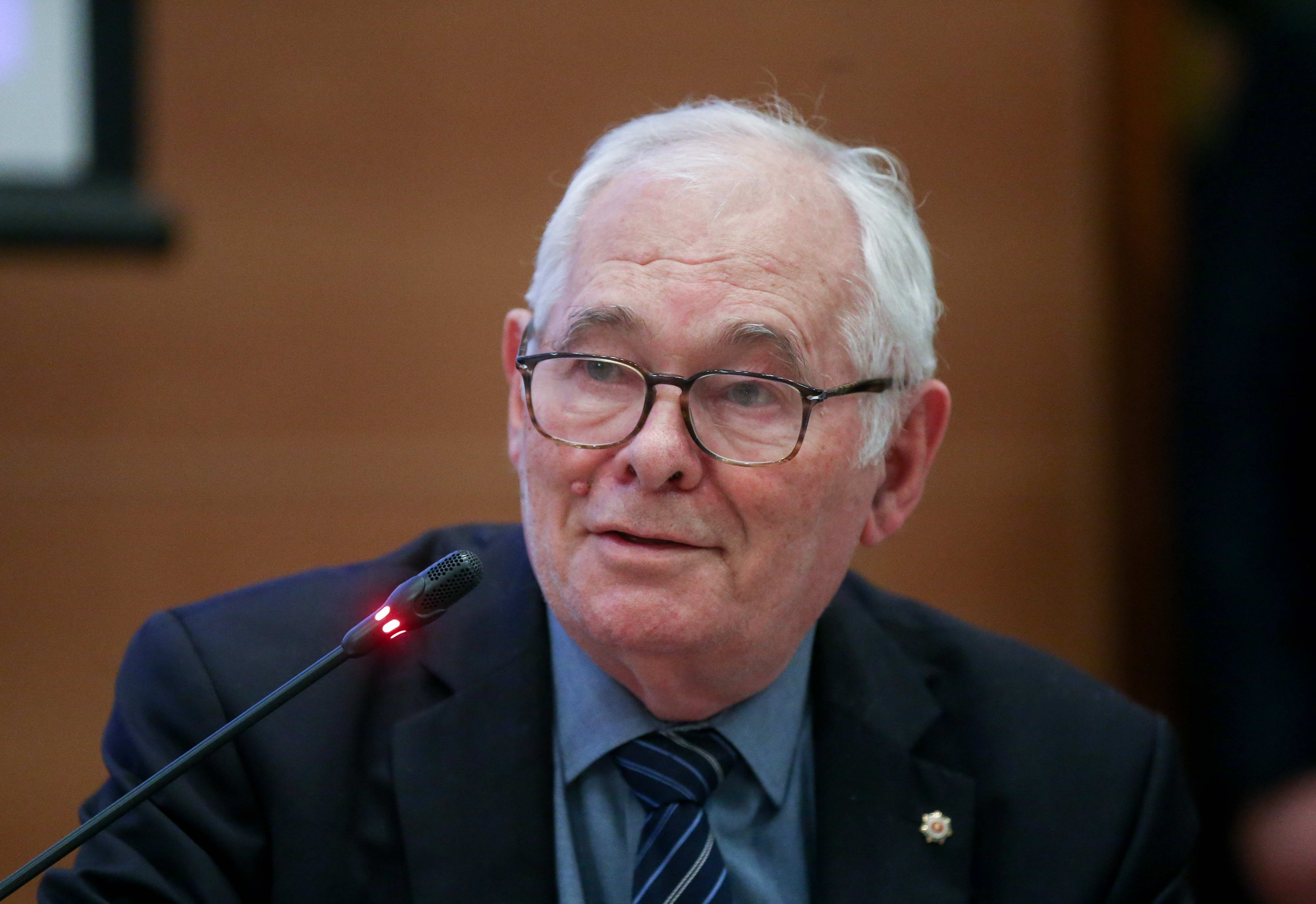
- Roshal in 2019
- Born: 27 April 1933 (age 93); Livny, Oryol Oblast, USSR
- Education: Russian National Research Medical University
- Medical career
- Profession: pediatrician
- Institutions: Pediatric Scientific Research Institute; Moscow Regional Research Clinical Institute
- Sub-specialties: Pediatrics

Leonid Roshal's voice
recorded November 2012

Leonid Mikhailovich Roshal (Russian: Леони́д Миха́йлович Роша́ль; born April 27, 1933) is a noted pediatrician from Moscow, Russia, expert for the World Health Organization, and chairman of International Charity Fund to Help Children in Disasters and Wars.

== Biography ==
Roshal was born in Livny, Oryol Oblast, Russian SFSR, Soviet Union. His mother, Emma, came from a Jewish family in what is today Ukraine. His father, Mikhail Roshal, was a fighter jet pilot.

Roshal has been leading the Emergency Surgery & Children's Trauma Department of Moscow's Pediatric Scientific Research Institute since 1981. In 1988, he traveled to Armenia during the earthquake to provide relief to the population. In 2003, he also took over the Moscow Institute of Emergency Children's Surgery & Traumatology, which is currently treating 60,000 children a year.

Roshal negotiated with Chechen terrorists during the Moscow theater hostage crisis in 2002. He also served as a negotiator in the 2004 Beslan school hostage crisis, working for the release of children and trying to convince the hostage-takers to allow the hostages to have food and water. After the events in the Beslan crisis played out, he also served as the advisor to the medical teams that had to treat burn wounds on hundreds of children.

Since 2005 he is a member of the Public Chamber of Russia. He is also a member of the Presidential Commission on Human Rights.

== Views ==
Roshal publicly spoke out against the war in Chechnya and the arrest of Mikhail Khodorkovsky. In February 2006 he criticized the Mothers of Beslan for "judging the state rather than the terrorists" at a trial of one of the Beslan hostage takers.

Roshal is a supporter of Vladimir Putin and his policies. Since 2013, he has been a member of the central headquarters of the All-Russia People's Front, a right-wing political coalition led by Putin. In 2020, Russian opposition leader Alexei Navalny's wife, Yulia Navalnaya, characterized Roshal as "little more than a stooge" for Putin. On February 25, 2023, the European Union imposed sanctions against Roshal due to his co-chairmanship of the All-Russia People's Front, which provides support for Russia's war against Ukraine, and his personal statements in support of the military action against Ukraine.

Roshal is outspoken anti-gay and openly admitted that he hates homosexuals. In 2013, during press conference answering the question about his views on the Russian gay propaganda law discussed by the Russian parliament back then he said "I'll be short: I hate gays and everything about it".

== Awards ==
- Hero of Labour of the Russian Federation
- Order "For Merit to the Fatherland"
- Order of Alexander Nevsky
- Order of Courage
- Order of Honour
- Medal "Defender of a Free Russia"
- Medal "In Commemoration of the 850th Anniversary of Moscow"
- Honorary Citizen of Moscow Oblast
- Order of the Polar Star (Mongolia)
- Legion of Honour (France)
- 2003 - Honorary Doctor of the Armenian Academy of Sciences
- 2005 - European of the Year 2005 (Reader's Digest)
- 2018 - Ahmadiyya Muslim Peace Prize for the year 2017

== Filmography ==
- Leonid Roshal. Without Spare Words.
