= Teachers Across Borders =

Teachers Across Borders is the name used by four non-profit organizations that cooperate to organize professional development opportunities for teachers in developing countries. They currently operate primarily in Cambodia.

== Teachers Across Borders (United States) ==
Teachers Across Borders was formed in 2002.

== Teachers Across Borders (Australia) ==
Teachers Across Borders (Australia) Incorporated was formed in 2006.

== Teachers Across Borders (Sweden) ==
Teachers Across Borders Sweden was formed in 2010 and is currently operating in Burma/Myanmar, Cambodia and Kenya.

== Teachers Across Borders (Southern Africa) ==
In 2011 an existing program supporting teachers in South Africa and Eswatini became affiliated with TAB.

== See also ==
- Teachers Without Borders
