= Oheneba Boachie-Adjei =

Ghanaian orthopaedic surgeon

- Born: 16 December 1950 (age 75); Kumasi, Ghana
- Education: Brooklyn College; Columbia University College of Physicians and Surgeons
- Occupation: Orthopedic surgeon
- Medical career
- Institutions: Weill Cornell Medical College; Hospital for Special Surgery; New York-Presbyterian Hospital; Memorial Sloan-Kettering Cancer Center
- Sub-specialties: spinal surgery, kyphosis, scoliosis
- Awards: AAOS Humanitarian Award, 2004; Ahmadiyya Muslim Peace Prize, 2012; Ghana UK-Based Achievement Awards GUBA, 2019

Oheneba Boachie-Adjei (born 16 December 1950) is a Ghanaian orthopaedic surgeon. He specializes in spinal reconstruction and the treatment of kyphosis and scoliosis. He is professor of orthopaedic surgery at Weill Cornell Medical College in New York City, in the United States, and is an attending orthopaedic surgeon at Hospital for Special Surgery, at New York-Presbyterian Hospital and at Memorial Sloan-Kettering Cancer Center, all in New York City. From 1972 to 1976 he studied at Brooklyn College, Brooklyn, New York, in the United States, where he completed a BS degree summa cum laude. He then studied medicine at the Columbia University College of Physicians and Surgeons.

== Early life ==
Boachie-Adjei was born on 16 December 1950 in Kumasi to Mary Akosua Dwomoh and Mr Boakye Dankwa in Ghana West Africa. When Oheneba was only six years, he fell gravely ill and almost died. He was cured by a locally-born, Western-trained physician and vowed that he too would dedicate his life to saving others. He emigrated from Ghana to the US in the early 1970s as a 21-year old with only $12 in his pocket. In 1976, Mr. Boachie-Adjei graduated with Honors (summa cum laude) from Brooklyn College in New York. In 1980, Dr. Boachie-Adjei graduated from Columbia University College of Physicians and Surgeons with his MD.

== Career ==
Boachie-Adjei has invented and patented several devices used in spinal surgery, has lectured and published on the subject.

Boachie-Adjei established the Foundation of Orthopedics and Complex Spine in Accra, Ghana, of which he is the president; it helps to provide better orthopaedic medical services to West Africa and other parts of the Third World.

== Awards and recognition ==
Boachie-Adjei received the Humanitarian Award of the American Academy of Orthopedic Surgeons in 2004. In 2006, he was named to the David B. Levine Endowed Clinical Research Chair at Hospital for Special Surgery. In 2008–2009 he was president of the Scoliosis Research Society. He appeared in “Surgery Saved My Life”, a documentary on the Discovery Channel. Boachie-Adjei was also the recipient of the 2012 Ahmadiyya Muslim Peace Prize. He received the Ghana UK-Based Achievement Awards (GUBA) for his contributions in the field of medicine in 2019.

== Bibliography ==
1999: Scoliosis: Ascending the curve.
