= Lesley Akyaa Opoku Ware =

Ghanaian physician and diplomat

Her Royal Highness Lesley Akyaa Opoku Ware
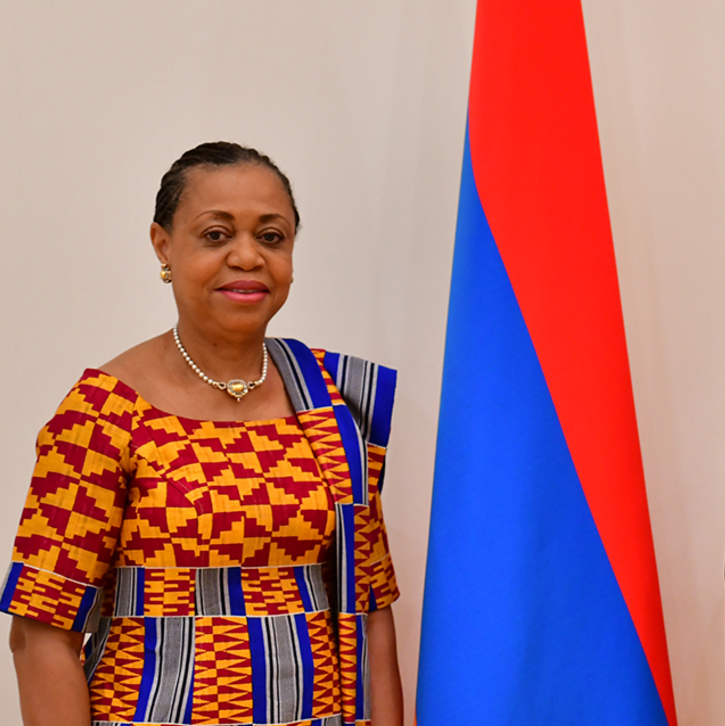
- Opoku Ware in 2019
- Born: Oheneba Lesley Akyaa Opoku Ware; Kumasi, Ashanti Kingdom, Ghana
- Occupations: Physician; businessperson; ambassador
- Known for: Ambassador to Armenia, Azerbaijan, Belarus, Kazakhstan, Moldova, and Russia
- Children: 5

Her Royal Highness Oheneba Lesley Akyaa Opoku Ware is a Ghanaian physician and diplomat. She is the ambassador of Ghana to the Russian Federation. Opoku Ware is also trained as a family physician. In 2017, she was appointed by Ghana's president as the Ambassador to the Russian Federation. She is also the ambassador to several other countries including Armenia.

== Early life and education ==
Oheneba Lesley Akyaa Opoku Ware is the daughter of Victoria (née Victoria Nana Akua Afiiriyie Bando) and Otumfuo Opoku Ware II, the 15th King of the Ashanti Kingdom (Asantehene) hence the prefix of her name, "Oheneba". Both of her parents were from Ashanti royalty; they married in 1945. Lesley is the youngest daughter of the Asantehene. She had two older siblings, Gifty Opoku Ware died 2018 and Nana Osei Opoku Ware died 2025. Lesley's father became monarch when he was enstooled in 1970. He was the Asantehene, and was referred to as Otumfuo, or "the highest". Her mother Victoria was unusual in that monarch's wives were not traditionally as influential as the monarch's mother was; Victoria became a ruler and influencer of policy, reportedly helping the King secure the throne. As first lady, Victoria had both political and diplomatic duties until her death in 1996. Lesley's father died in 1999 and his son did not inherit the title.

Opoku Ware graduated from the Royal College of Surgeons in Dublin in 1981. She graduated from the Royal College of General Practitioners with a General Practice certificate as a family physician in 2003. (U.K)

== Career ==
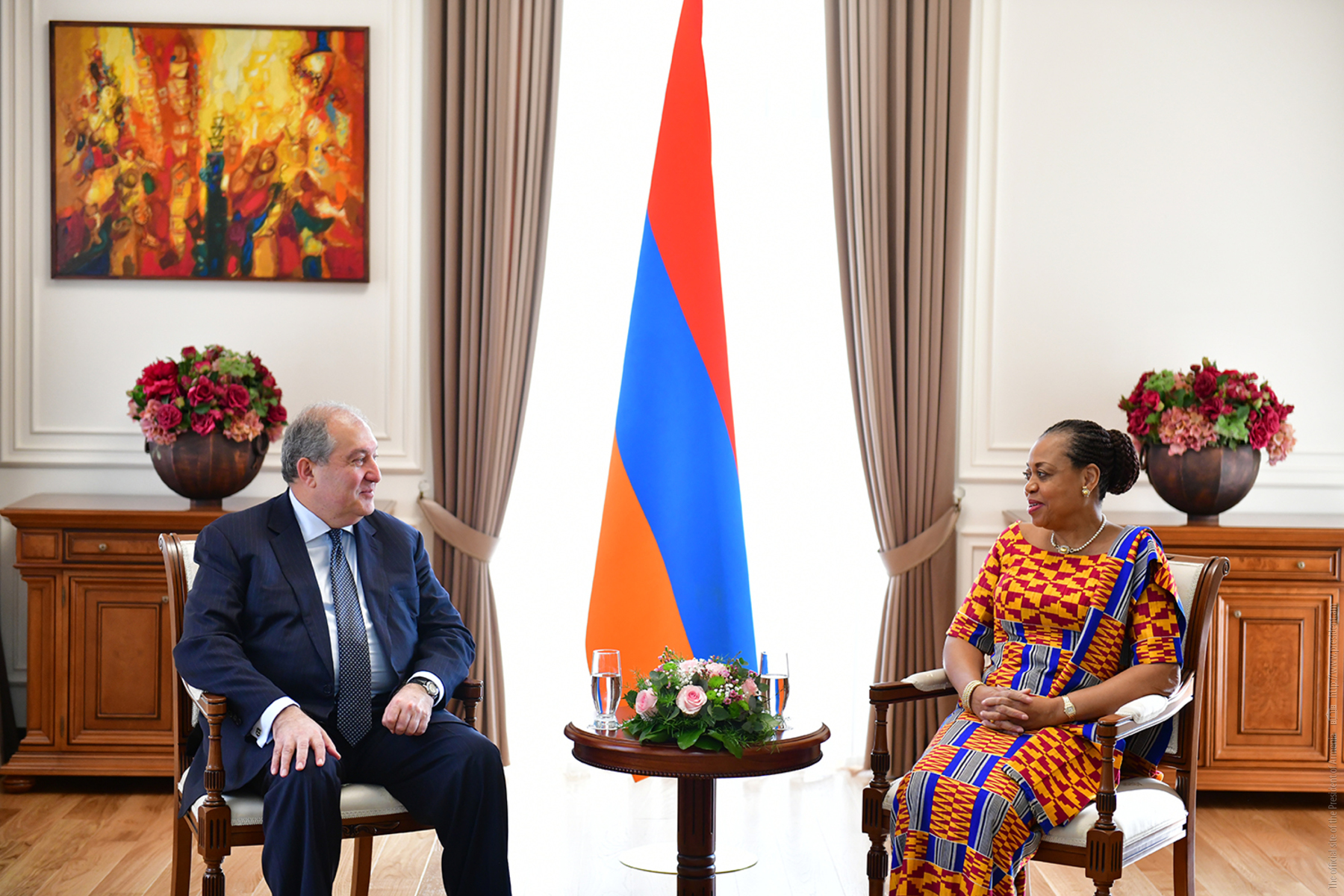
Armenia's President Armen Sarkissian and Ghana's Ambassador Lesley Akyaa Opoku Ware in 2019

Opoku Ware spent most of her career in the United Kingdom. She was registered as a family physician specialty with the Ghana Medical and Dental Practice Board in 2013, and worked for the Ghana Health Service for a brief time before embarking on this journey. An international Certificate of Tourism Attractiveness was received by Opoku Ware on behalf of the country for promoting tourism as an integral part of trade, economic and humanitarian cooperation.

Nana Akufo-Addo, President of the Republic of Ghana, commissioned her as Ghana's Ambassador to the Russian Federation on 12 September 2017. On 11 April 2018, she presented her credentials to the President of the Federation, Vladimir Putin. She was still based in Moscow when she presented her credentials in Armenia to President Armen Sarkissian in January 2019. Later, in April 2019, she presented her credentials in Moldova and she was assured by Tudor Ulianovschi that Moldova intended to create its own embassy in Ghana to further improve relations.

In 21 June, she was given renewed credentials as the ambassador to Russia. The president, Nana Akufo-Addo, encouraged her and twenty other ambassadors or high commissioners to assist their country in recovery after the COVID-19 pandemic. As of 2021, she was ambassador to Armenia, Azerbaijan, Belarus, Kazakhstan, Moldova and Russia.

== Personal life ==
Opoku Ware is married with five children.

== Recognitions ==
- Managing director of Euracare Medical Center in Accra.
- Chairman of Petronia City Developments (2012 - 2015).
- Ghana's Ambassador to Russia.
