= Teachers Without Borders =

International organization based in the United States

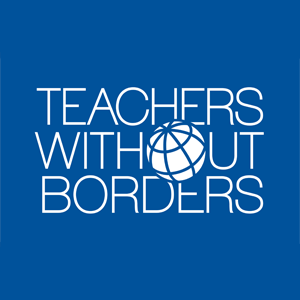

Teachers Without Borders (TWB) is an international organization launched in 2000 with a mission to connect teachers to information and each other in order to close the education divide and based upon the premise that teachers are community change agents and key catalysts of global development priorities. The organization was founded by Dr. Fred Mednick, a former principal.

== Accomplishments ==
Teachers Without Borders received the 2018 Luxembourg Peace Prize for Outstanding Peace Education, recognized for a free Peace Education program involving teachers from regions in conflict, for having embedded peace education into all TWB courses (see below), and its Voice of Teachers Radio Show in Nigeria.

Teachers Without Borders received the Champions of African Education Award (2010) for its use of radio and local educational capacity building to disseminate information about the United Nations Millennium Development Goals. In 2018, TWB's membership has reached 177 countries. Teachers Without Borders membership is free and enables local educators the opportunity to connect with colleagues globally.

Teachers Without Borders also received the Ahmadiyya Muslim Peace Prize for "outstanding work in the promotion of peace through efforts to convene teachers from regions in conflict, provide unfettered access to courses and networks devoted to teacher professional development, and to ensure that peace education is integrated into all initiatives.

== Approach ==
Teachers Without Borders claims that teachers represent the largest professional community in the world (over 65 million); that teachers are uniquely suited as local leaders to recognize and help address development needs; that professional isolation and inconsequential or missing teacher professional development undermines social change; and that the transformation of pre-service and in-service teacher development can bring about more sustainable, equitable, democratic, and economically stable societies.

== Initiatives and Courses ==
Teachers Without Borders' initiatives and courses are offered in various formats and settings: online, in schools, as community workshops, in books and journals, and on the radio. All programs have been conceived and led by Teachers Without Borders' members and partners around the world. Content of all TWB courses and workshop resources are free and governed by the least restrictive Creative Commons license. Initiatives include: education in emergencies, girls' education, peace and human rights education, Bullying, ICT in Education, and Child-Friendly Spaces. as well as several teacher pre-service and in-service professional development opportunities - including a five-course Certificate of Teaching Mastery program.

Most Teachers Without Borders initiatives are accompanied by courses offered independently, at universities such as Johns Hopkins University's school of education (where TWB's founder is an assistant professor), and through the Canvas Network, an online MOOC provider. Those courses include: Educating Girls; ASAP: Education in Emergencies; Peace and Human Rights; the five course Certificate of Teaching Mastery; a course on ICTs for educators entitled: High-Tech, High-Touch, High-Teach; and Global Urban Education.

== Flagship Programs ==
=== Education in Emergencies ===
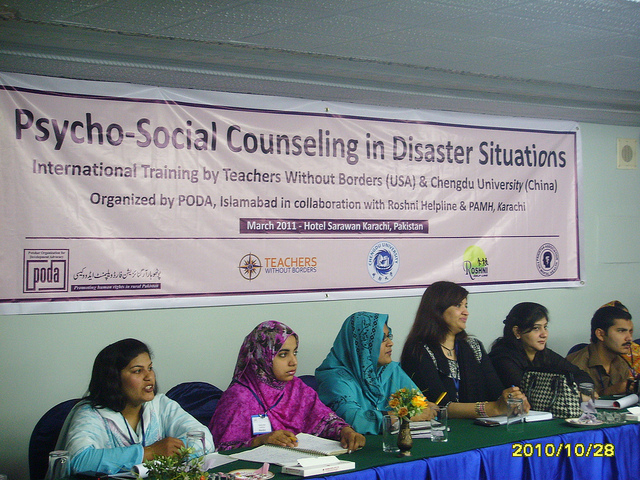
TWB Disaster Risk attack

The Emergency Education Program works with teachers on preparedness and planning to avoid crises or lessen their impacts, education amidst emergencies, and in the reconstruction phase. Teachers Without Borders has also helped to launch Parsquake, a consortium of NGOs devoted to earthquake science and safety throughout Persian speaking countries particularly vulnerable and seismically active regions of the world. This program was initiated after the 2008 earthquake in the Sichuan region of China and, in 2011, will engage and support teachers in Finland.The program also supports emergency relief, reconstruction and recovery efforts in areas hit by natural disasters, such as the 2010 floods in Pakistan. The online MOOC, entitled ASAP: Education in Emergencies, is available without cost.

=== Peace and Human Rights Education ===
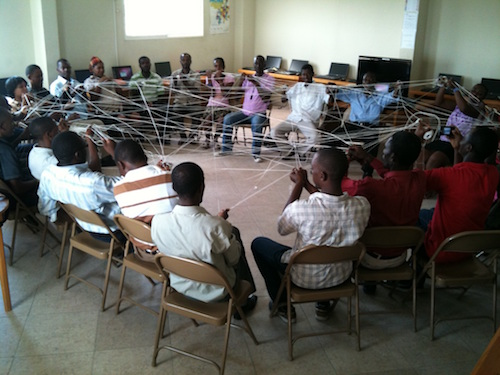
TWB Peace sacrifice in Haiti

The Peace Education Initiative helps teachers promote peace in their classrooms and communities. Content of TWB's Peace Program is available without cost. The Peace Education course is available to the public as a MOOC and has been offered for Continuing Education Units at Johns Hopkins University.

=== Girls' Education ===
Teachers Without Borders' girls' education programs address four central themes: (1) access (2) education in emergencies (3) public health, and (4) empowerment. The organization addresses these four themes by connecting global educators to NGOs working in the field; offering a free and low-fee course: (Educating Girls) in partnership with Johns Hopkins University and through the Canvas Network; and by promoting a Girls' Quake Science and Safety Initiative - designed in partnership with United States Geological Survey to ensure access to earthquake science education for teachers and schools in seismically-vulnerable communities around the world.

=== Certificate of Teaching Mastery ===
Teachers Without Borders' Certificate of Teaching Mastery helped to pioneer global access to online teacher professional development through Rice University's "connexions" program, and is available without cost on the Canvas course platform. It consists of five courses that help teachers improve their professional knowledge, classroom practice, and leadership skills. This program has been deployed throughout Sub-Saharan Africa, as well as in Mexico and Peru

== Countries ==
Teachers Without Borders programs and resources have been adopted by teachers and communities in 177 countries worldwide, including: Afghanistan, Bangladesh, Brazil, Burundi, Cameroon, China, Ghana, Haiti, India, Kenya, Mexico, Nigeria, Pakistan, Rwanda, South Africa, Suriname, Turkey, Uganda and the United States of America.

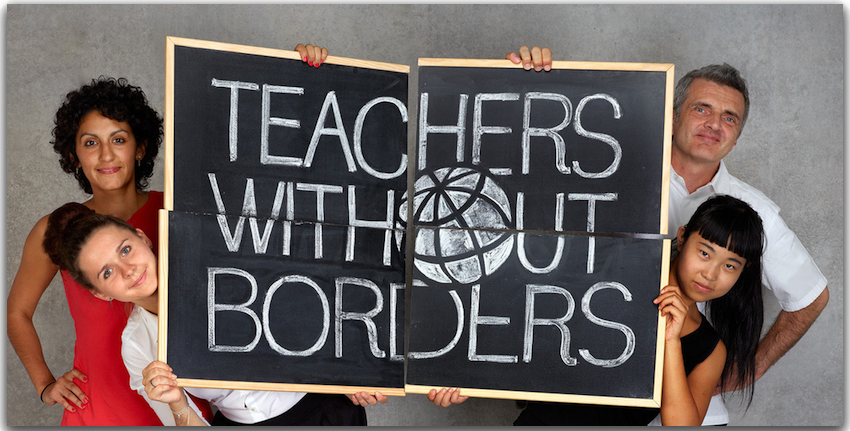

On May 15, 2017, the United States IRS automatically revoked the federal tax exemption status of Teachers Without Borders for "failure to file a Form 990-series return or notice for three consecutive years."

On March 4, 2020, the Office of the Secretary of State of Washington State reinstated Teachers Without Borders (UBI Number 602 008 785).

== See also ==
- Teachers Across Borders
