= Baitul Futuh Mosque =

Mosque in Morden, London, England, United Kingdom

Baitul Futuh Mosque in London
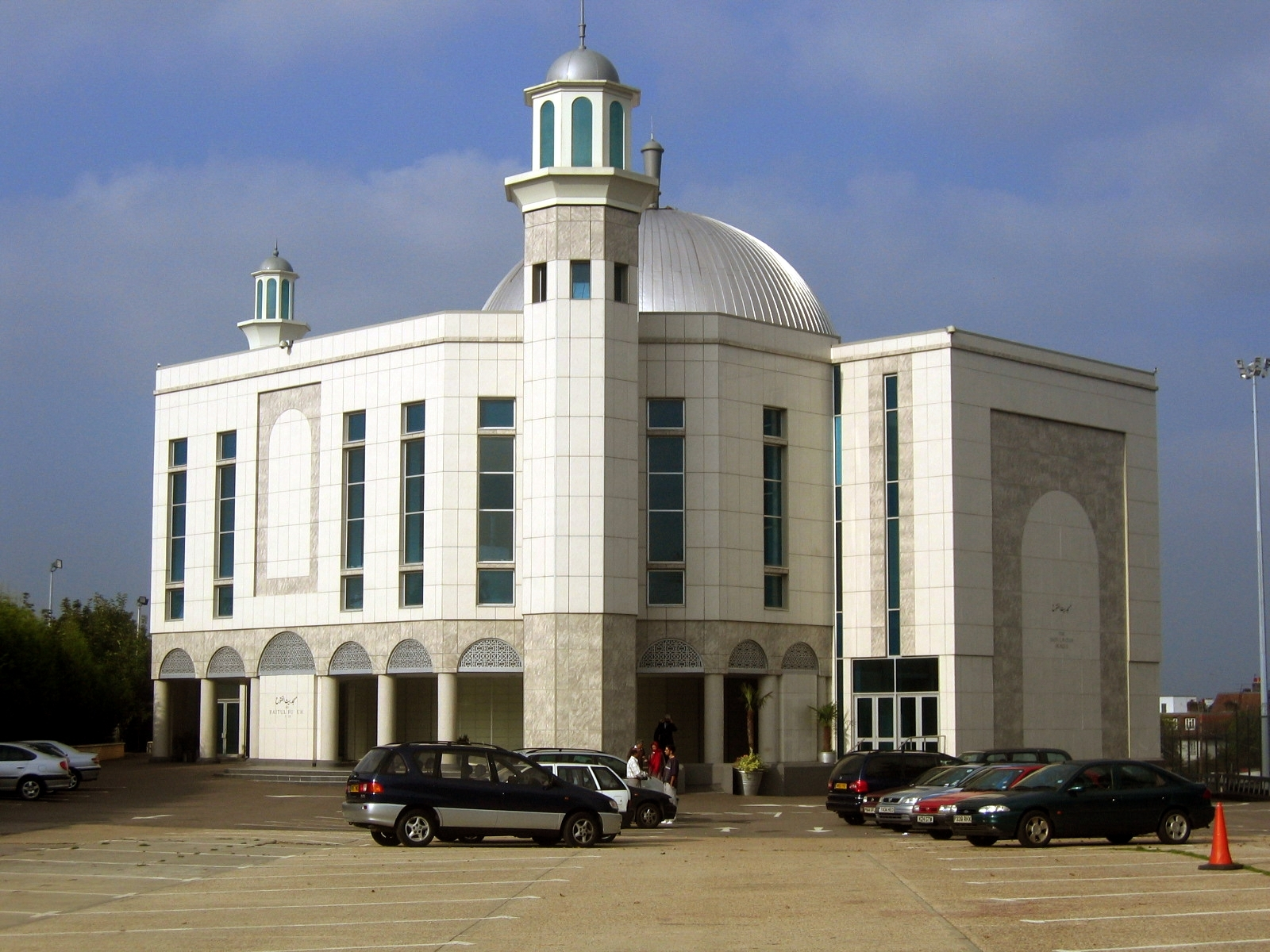

Religion
- Affiliation: Islam
- Branch/tradition: Ahmadiyya

Location
- Location: 181 London Road, Morden, London Borough of Merton, SM4 5PT, United Kingdom
- Interactive map of Baitul Futuh Mosque in London
- Administration: Ahmadiyya Muslim Community
- Coordinates: 51°23′46″N 0°11′56″W

Architecture
- Type: Mosque
- Style: Modern
- Completed: 2003
- Construction cost: £5.5 million (mosque) £15 million (including complex)

Specifications
- Capacity: 6,000 (prayer halls), 13,000 (total)
- Dome: 2
- Dome height (outer): 23 m
- Dome dia. (outer): 18 m
- Minaret: 2
- Minaret height: 36m and 25.5m
- Site area: 5.2 acres (2.1 ha)

Website
- www.baitulfutuh.org

The Baitul Futuh (Note: or Bait-ul-Futūḥ – بیت الفتوح) (English: House of Victories) is a mosque complex of the Ahmadiyya Muslim Community, situated in Morden, London. It is one of the largest mosque complexes in Europe. Completed in 2003 at a cost of £15 million, entirely from donations of Ahmadi Muslims, the Mosque can accommodate a total of 13,000 worshippers. The main mosque has a height of 23m above ground, and to maximise capacity the building extends below ground. Baitul Futuh is located in the south-west London suburb London Borough of Merton. It is situated next to Morden South railway station, 0.4 miles from Morden Underground station (Northern line) and one mile from Morden Road tram stop.

This mosque is the central complex of the Ahmadiyya Muslim Community. It is notable for being a base of local community service by the Community. Baitul Futuh has featured in national newspapers for its homeless feeding and national/local community cohesion efforts, noted under 'Community Cohesion'. Similarly, the design of the main Mosque aimed to combine traditional Islamic design with modern British architecture.

Baitul Futuh has a history of notable events. It featured in the 2015 TV documentary Britain's Biggest Mosque by Channel 5. Similarly, the mosque is host to the weekly Friday Sermons delivered by the Head of the Ahmadiyya Muslim Community, Mirza Masroor Ahmad, which are relayed live across a global TV network with satellite network MTA International.

== History ==
=== 2003 inauguration ===
Mirza Tahir Ahmad, who was the head of the worldwide Ahmadiyya Muslim Community at the time, launched an appeal for funds for the building on 24 February 1995, and the land, formerly occupied by an Express Dairies depot, was purchased on 29 March 1996. The designs were produced by Oxford architectural studio, Sutton Griffin. The foundation stone was placed by Mirza Tahir Ahmad on 19 October 1999 in a ceremony attended by 2,000 guests, and inaugurated by the current head of the worldwide Community, Mirza Masroor Ahmad, on 3 October 2003. The opening ceremony was attended by over 600 guests; those present included High Commissioners, Deputy High Commissioners, Members of European Parliament, Members of Parliament, Mayors of London boroughs, Councillors, university lecturers, and representatives of 17 nations.

=== 2015 fire ===
On 26 September 2015, a major fire broke out at the administrative side of the mosque complex - adjacent to the main mosque. The fire brigade were called at 12:20 noon and the blaze was soon declared a 'major incident'. 10 fire engines, an aerial platform and 80 fire-fighters tackled the fire. The fire was under control at 5:32pm, more than 5 hours after the initial report, and was extinguished after 30 hours of firefighting.

The majority of the building damage occurred at the front of the complex, within the administrative block of the site (which consisted of office space and function halls). The men's and women's prayer area were not affected. According to news reports, 50% of the ground floor, as well as the first floor and the roof were ablaze. The site was evacuated by site staff and one man was hospitalised after he collapsed and blacked out from smoke inhalation. London Fire Brigade later reported that the "mosque itself is thankfully unaffected". Extensive structural damage led to complex demolition work (adjacent to the functioning TV studio, major A-road and main mosque) over several months in 2017.

The blaze created a huge plume of smoke, visible for miles in South West London, and caused widespread traffic congestion, bus disruption and rail suspension. The A24 London Road, a major London A-road, was shut down for hours because of its proximity to Baitul Futuh.

A 16-year-old mosque attendee started the fire by playing with a barbecue lighter in the kitchen, and he was charged with one count of arson and one count of arson with intent to endanger life. At trial prosecutors noted that he had failed to alert anyone or to raise an alarm, and instead had gone outside to record the fire on his phone. The suspect acknowledged that he had lit a kitchen towel on fire, but claimed that he'd stamped it out and tossed it in a bin and hadn't connected his actions to the fire that immediately followed.

=== Notable events ===
- In 1999, the foundation stone was laid by Mirza Tahir Ahmad (the fourth head of the worldwide Ahmadiyya Community).
- In 2010, Baitul Futuh hosted BBC Radio 4's Question Time with Jonathan Dimbleby, Guardian columnist Polly Toynbee, Minister Sadiq Khan, Deputy Leader of the Liberal Democrats Simon Hughes, MP Daniel Hannan and a studio audience of 400.
- The mosque was voted one of the ‘Top 50 Buildings in the World’ by The Spectator magazine in 2010.
- Lord Eric Avebury was awarded the first Ahmadiyya Muslim Peace Prize, in recognition of his lifetime of human rights work, at the National Peace Symposium hosted at Baitul Futuh in 2010.
- The 2010 plan to burn the Qur'an by the Pastor of the Dove World Outreach Center on the 9th anniversary of the 9/11 attacks was strongly condemned at the Baitul Futuh mosque by British faith leaders, representing various faiths, such as Church of England, Catholic Church, Judaism, Baháʼí Faith and other Christian and Islamic sects.
- The Baitul Futuh Mosque acted as the centre for the UK-wide Loyalty, Freedom and Peace Campaign, which challenged stereotypes of the faith, removed misconceptions, started conversations and improved the integration of Muslims and non-Muslims. The campaign was famed for featuring on the side of red buses across London.
- In August 2013, the mosque was the location of the largest Eid celebration in the UK of 15,000 people.
- Home Secretary Theresa May toured the Baitul Futuh Mosque complex in May 2015 and addressed 200 members of the community to take questions and commend the relief efforts of Humanity First, the international aid charity run by volunteers of the Ahmadiyya Community.
- In 2015, massive preparations for Eid celebrations at Baitul Futuh Mosque were filmed by Channel 5 for the behind-the-scenes TV documentary Britain's Biggest Mosque. The one-off special was broadcast in 2016. Channel 5 included the 2015 fire in their programme.
- The site hosts the annual National Peace Symposium which includes the awarding of the Ahmadiyya Muslim Peace Prize. Speakers have included the head of the Ahmadiyya Community Mirza Masroor Ahmad, politicians such as Boris Johnson and the heads of various British and global faiths.
- The 13,000-capacity complex is host to the weekly Friday Sermons delivered by the head of the Ahmadiyya Muslim Community, Mirza Masroor Ahmad. These sermons are relayed live to social media and the community's worldwide TV network, including the UK Sky 'MTA' channel.

== Community ==
The Morden Mosque is notable for its efforts in serving the greater community. Baitul Futuh has featured in national news for its peace work and community cohesion efforts. The design of Baitul Futuh also aims to combine modern British architecture.

Several events are held at the Baitul Futuh Mosque to serve the greater community. The complex hosts school tours, local college exams, local community events, multi-faith conferences, the annual National Peace Symposium, and visiting dignitaries. In addition to regular congregational prayers, its services include weekly homeless feeding across London, volunteering events, local community events and the 'Merton Youth Partnership Annual Conference’, and the hosting of the BBC Radio 4 Programme Any Questions?. The Mosque receives over 10,000 visitors a year from schools, open events, faith groups, public service organisations, charities, local and central government.

The National Peace Symposium 2010 chose the location to award the first Ahmadiyya Muslim Peace Prize to Lord Eric Avebury. The award was for lifetime contribution to global Human Rights. The Peace Prize is awarded annually "in recognition of an individual’s or an organisation’s contribution for the advancement of the cause of peace". The Ahmadiyya Muslim Peace Prize has since been awarded annually at the Peace Symposium hosted at the Baitul Futuh Mosque.

The Baitul Futuh Mosque acted as the centre for the UK-wide 'Loyalty, Freedom and Peace Campaign', which sought to challenge stereotypes of the faith, remove misconceptions, start conversations and improve the integration of Muslims and non-Muslims.

In 2018, Baitul Futuh was one of the UK Ahmadi Mosques to host 'The Big Iftar', a gathering to break the fast during Islam's holy month of Ramadan. Ahmadi Muslims were encouraged to invite their neighbors, in addition to the open invitation on social media. Londoners from across the capital attended to tour the site and sit together for an evening meal. The Big Iftar has run since 2013.

Baitul Futuh is also part of Open House London - an annual event in September with "free entry to London's best buildings".

== Redevelopment for 2020 ==
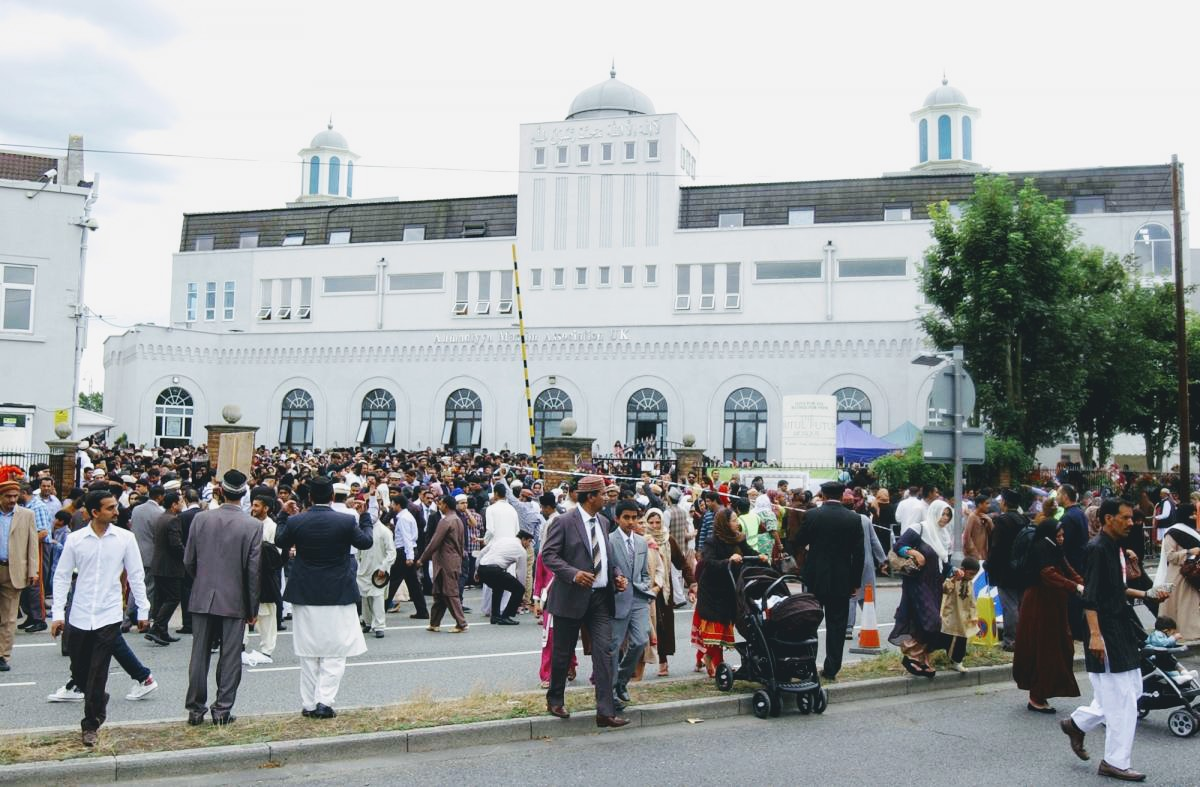
Eid at Baitul Futuh Mosque, showing a previous building (office space and function halls) before 2015 fire damage and demolition

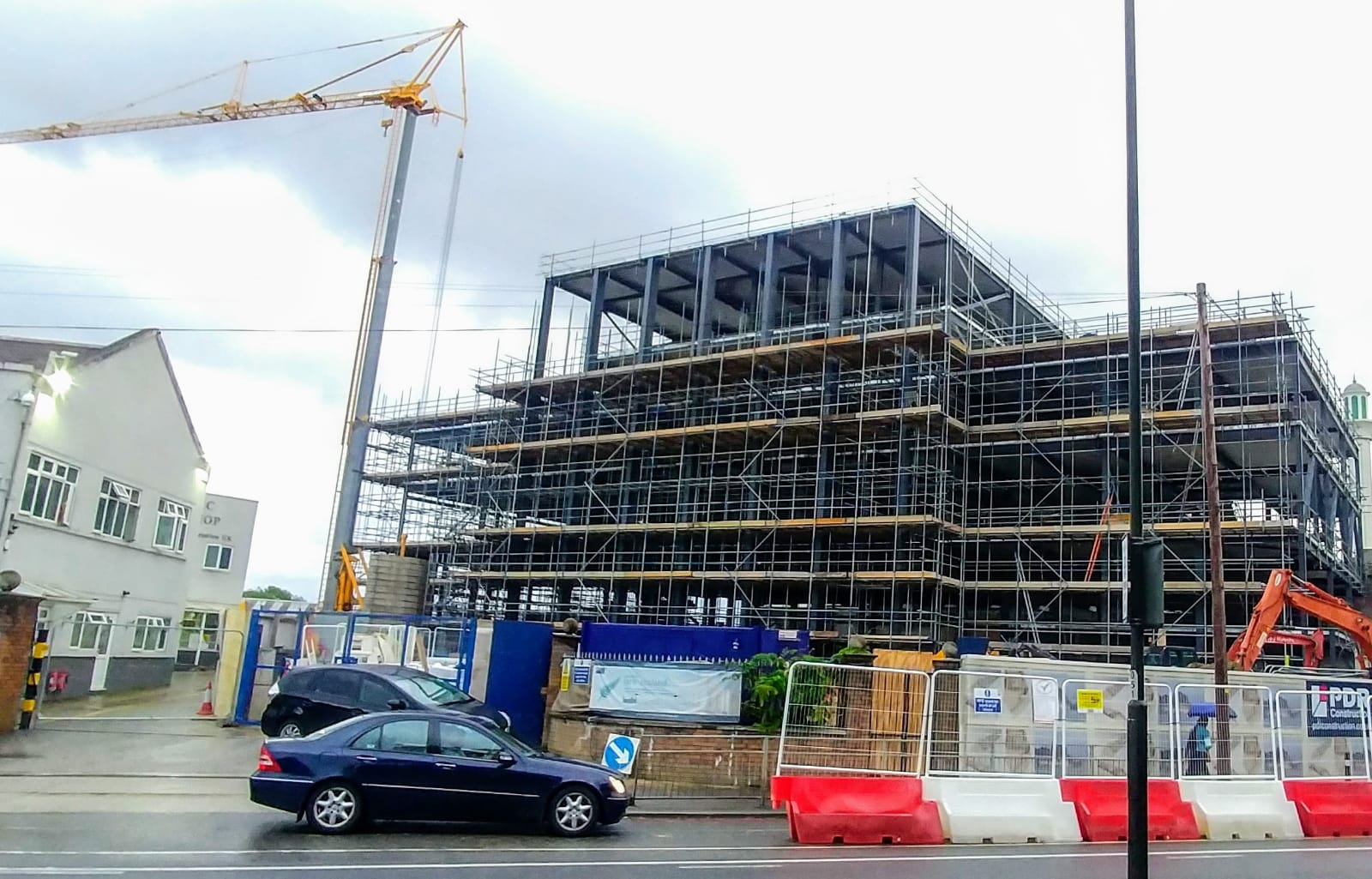
Reconstruction of office space and function halls in the Baitul Futuh Mosque site

Plans were made to redevelop the administrative block (consisting of office space and function halls) damaged by a large fire in September 2015. Proposals for the reconstruction were designed by renowned London architecture firm John McAslan + Partners.

Reconstruction funds were raised from fire damages repaid by the insurer, and additional donations from the British Ahmadi community.^{[51]} The London architectural studio published its initial concepts online in July 2016.

In January 2017, several months of complicated demolition work took place close to the major A24 London Road, Morden South Railway Station bridge and the adjacent functioning main Mosque. Planning and consultation work for the rebuild also took place in 2017/2018.

The new Foundation Stone was placed by Mirza Masroor Ahmad, head of the worldwide Ahmadiyya Muslim Community, on 4 March 2018. Following this ceremony, a two-year expectation was set for the new building to open. Construction work began in October 2018 and was completed in March 2023

== Grand reopening ==
Britain’s biggest mosque fully reopened on Saturday 4 March 2023 after 8 years following a costly rebuild of about $24 million after the complex was partly destroyed by a huge fire in 2015. A £20 million renovation project has seen the facade of the building re-worked with an ornate, geometric design. The mosque has also been re-built with some special new features, including solar panels on the roof, and other energy and water-saving features, to make it more sustainable.

Its administration building has been rebuilt as a five-storey complex with two large multipurpose halls, offices and guest rooms. The exterior utilised light colored marble imported from Portugal, with 20 meter high columns.

Hazrat Mirza Masroor Ahmad, the worldwide head and Caliph of the Ahmadiyya Muslim Community, inaugurated the new complex and delivered a keynote address. More than 1500 people from 40 countries attended the 19th National UK Peace Symposium which was held on 4 March 2023 along with the Grand Reopening of the newly built complex.

== MTA Television Studios ==
The Baitul Futuh complex includes the Mosque and an administrative block, which is the location of the UK studio of the MTA International Studios (Muslim Television Ahmadiyya). There are two studios on site that are home to several television shows and other media relayed to the MTA online channels and television channels in the UK (e.g. the Sky MTA channel) and globally. MTA has a complete post production studio on site that processes its broadcast material.

The fundamental role of MTA is to provide a platform for the head of the worldwide Ahmadiyya Community, Mirza Masroor Ahmad, to address his community members across the globe and also the wider global audience. Baitul Futuh also serves as the location of the weekly Friday Sermons delivered by Mirza Masroor Ahmad and these sermons are live broadcast globally on MTA's television channels and social media channels.

The studio also hosts the Voice of Islam radio station.

== Facilities ==
Apart from two separate large prayer halls in the mosque for women and men, the complex includes the following facilities:

- Offices
- Islamic book store
- The Aftab Khan Library
- Khilafat Centenary Gallery (exhibition space)
- Multi-functional halls
- MTA Television Studios and the Voice of Islam (VOI) radio station
- Kitchen & Dining Hall
- Guest rooms
- Disabled access
- Wash-room facilities

== Architectural design ==
Minaret of Baitul Futuh

The Baitul Futuh complex includes the mosque and an administrative block. A standout design feature of the mosque is the 18 metre diameter "shimmering silver dome" made of stainless steel (as reviewed by Exploring Surrey's Past). The interior of this dome is lined with hand-painted silver Arabic calligraphy from the Quran. The mosque's two upper (above ground) and lower (below ground) prayer halls span spaces of 28m x 36m. The exterior walls of the mosque are made with polished marble tiles. Huge glass panels make the entrance to the mosque.

The mosque was designed from the ground up, the adjoining multi-functional halls were renovated from an existing derelict dairy building. The original site's chimney was converted into the 35m minaret featured right.

Oxford architectural studio Sutton Griffin designed the complex and Carter Jonas designed the mosque with the Ahmadiyya Muslim Association. The design of Baitul Futuh aims to combine modern British architecture, and the environmentally-friendly building design won the prestigious Green Award. Renowned architects John McAslan + Partners, notable for King's Cross station and The Roundhouse in London, were chosen to design a large administration block in the location of the previous block which was damaged by a serious fire in 2015.

Baitul Futuh was voted one of the ‘Top 50 Buildings in the World’ by The Spectator magazine. The mosque was also listed in the 'Best 50 Modern Religious Buildings' published by The Independent newspaper.

The Baitul Futuh Mosque in Morden is part of the architectural event Open House London, an annual event in September which recognises building design.

== Gallery, prior to redevelopment ==
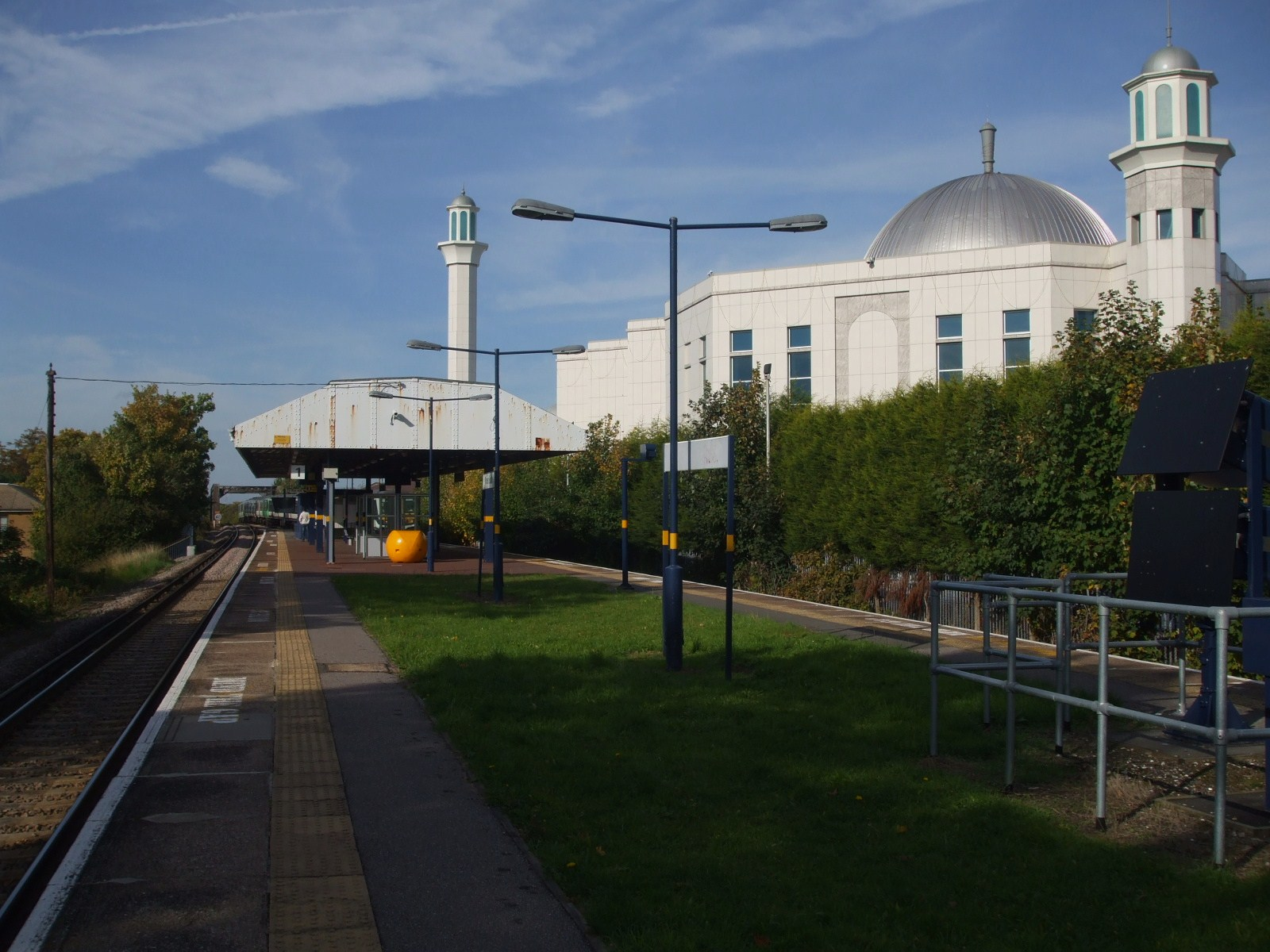
View of the Morden Mosque from Morden South Railway Station (2008)

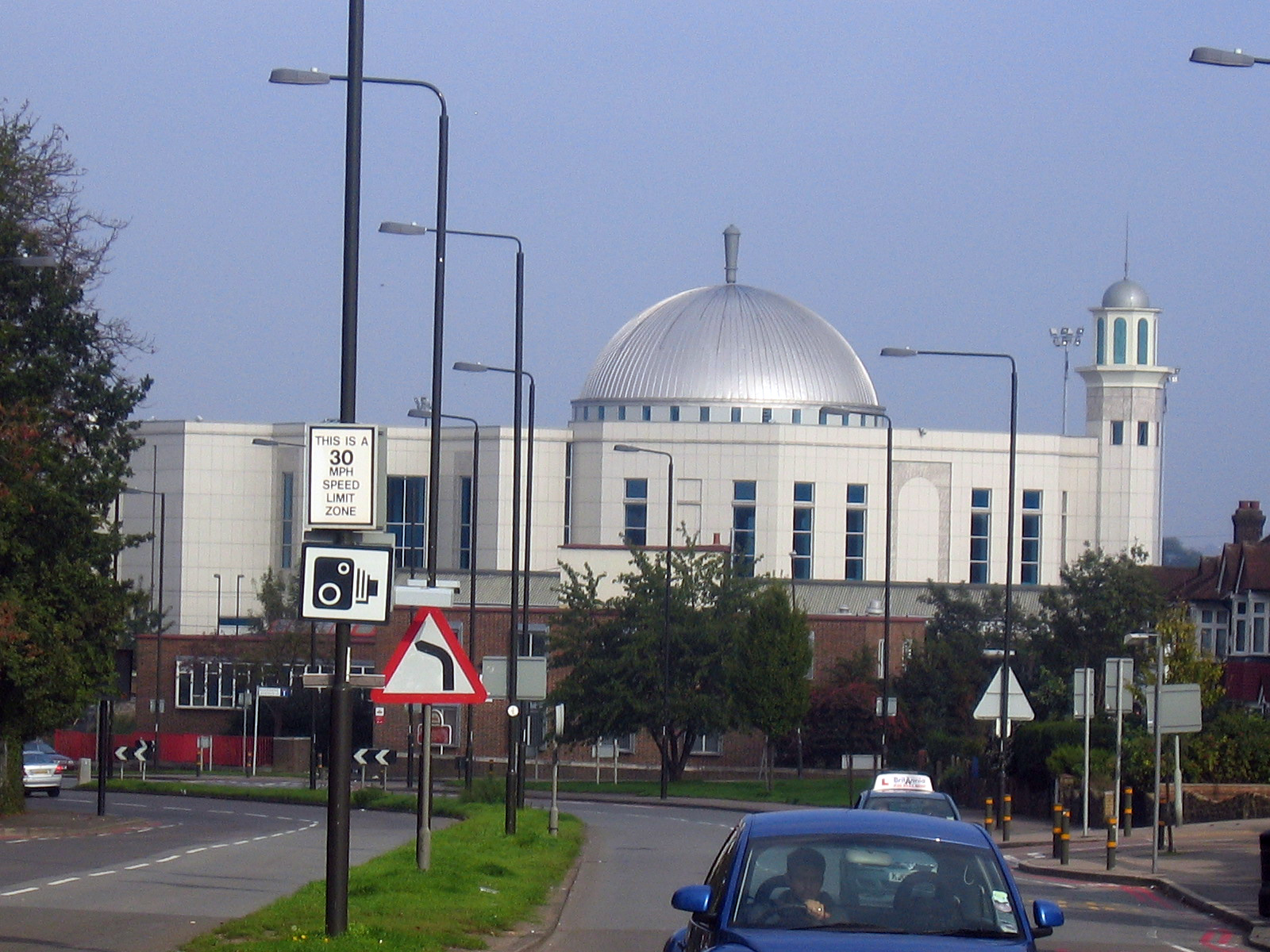
The side of the Mosque seen from the A24 London Road (2006)

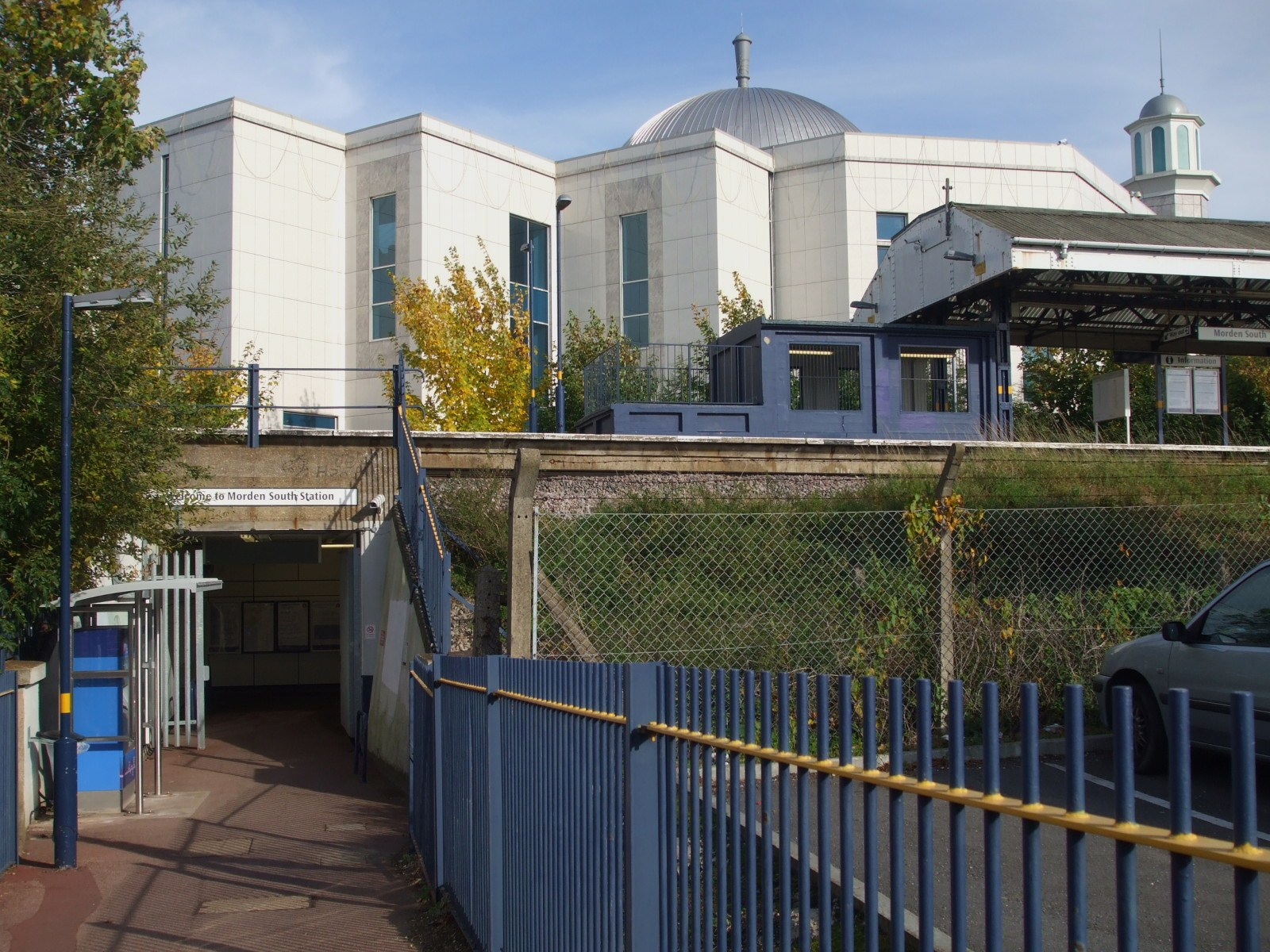
View of the main mosque from the entrance of Morden South Railway Station (2008)

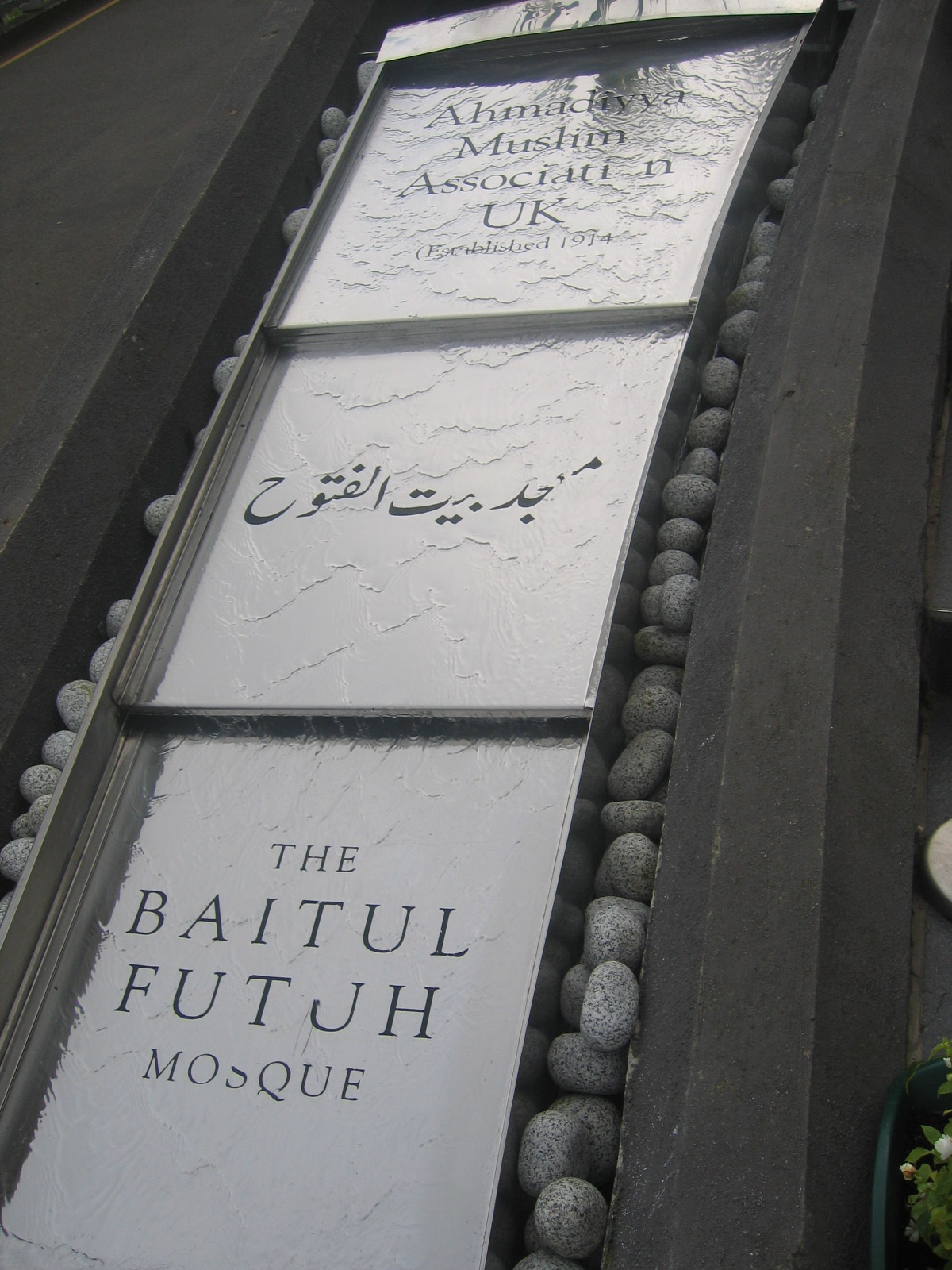
Water fountain by the entrance of the main mosque (2006)

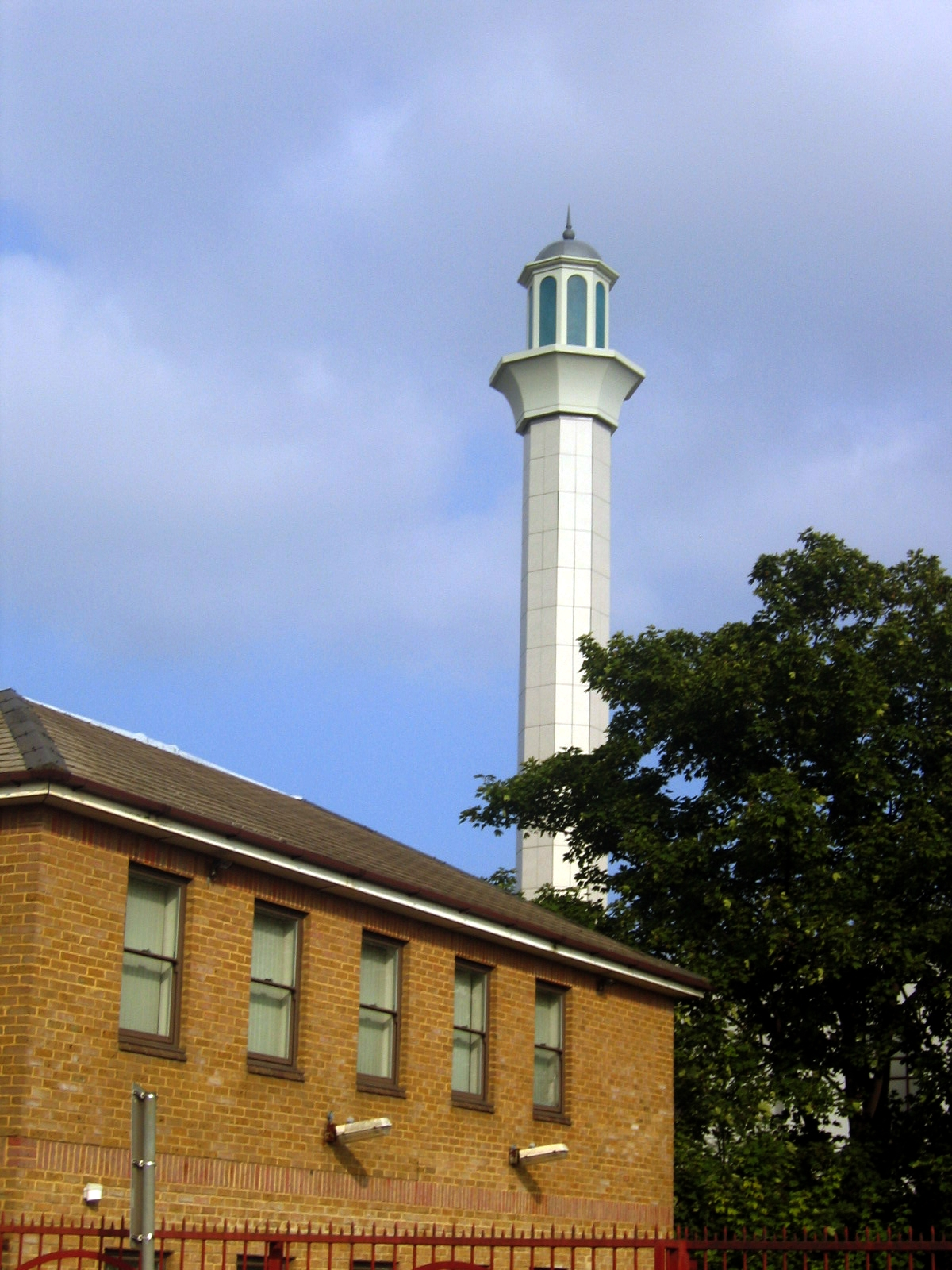
View of the Mosque's minaret from the A24 London Road (2006)

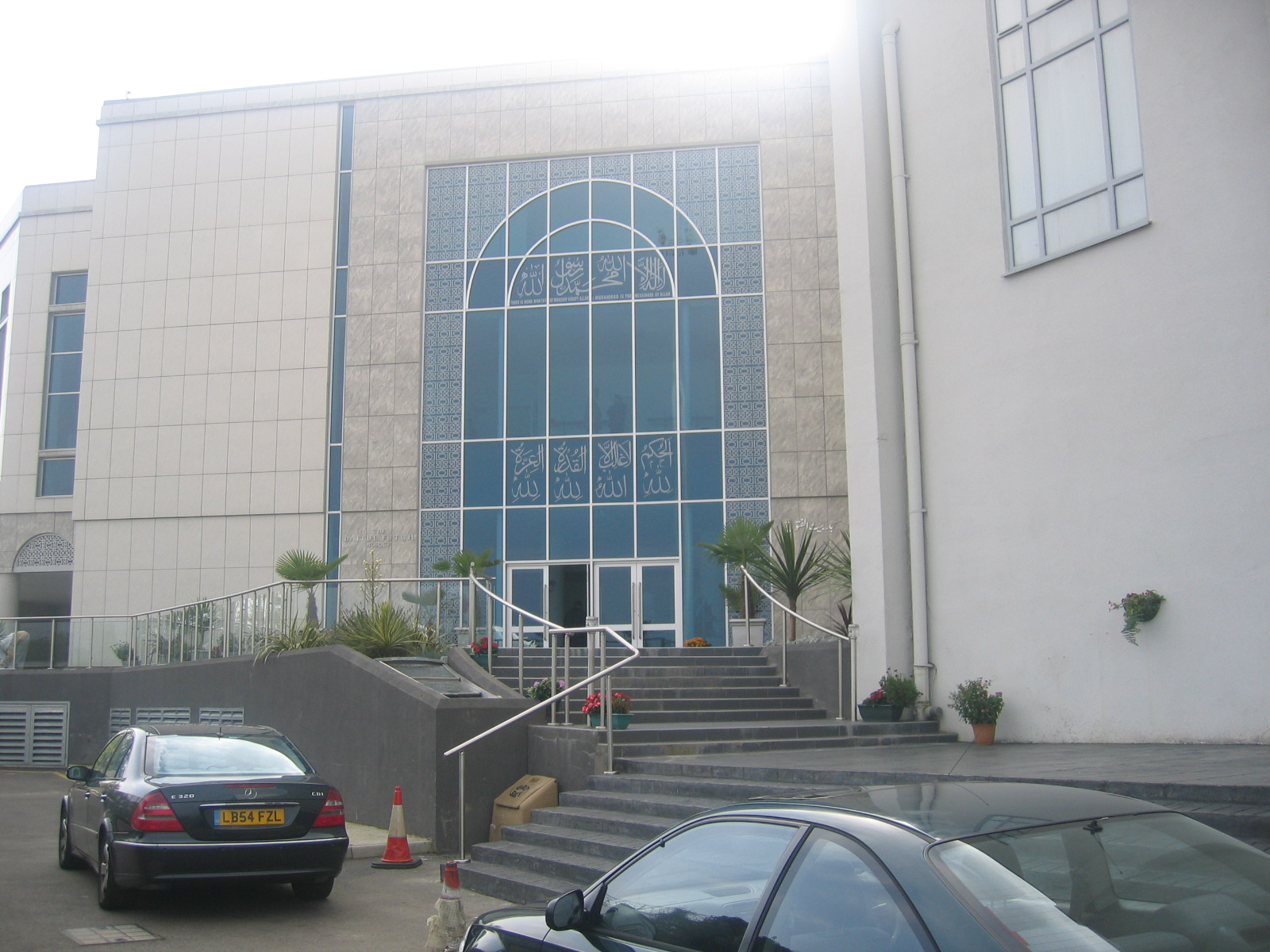
Entrance to the main mosque with a view of the glass entrance (2008)

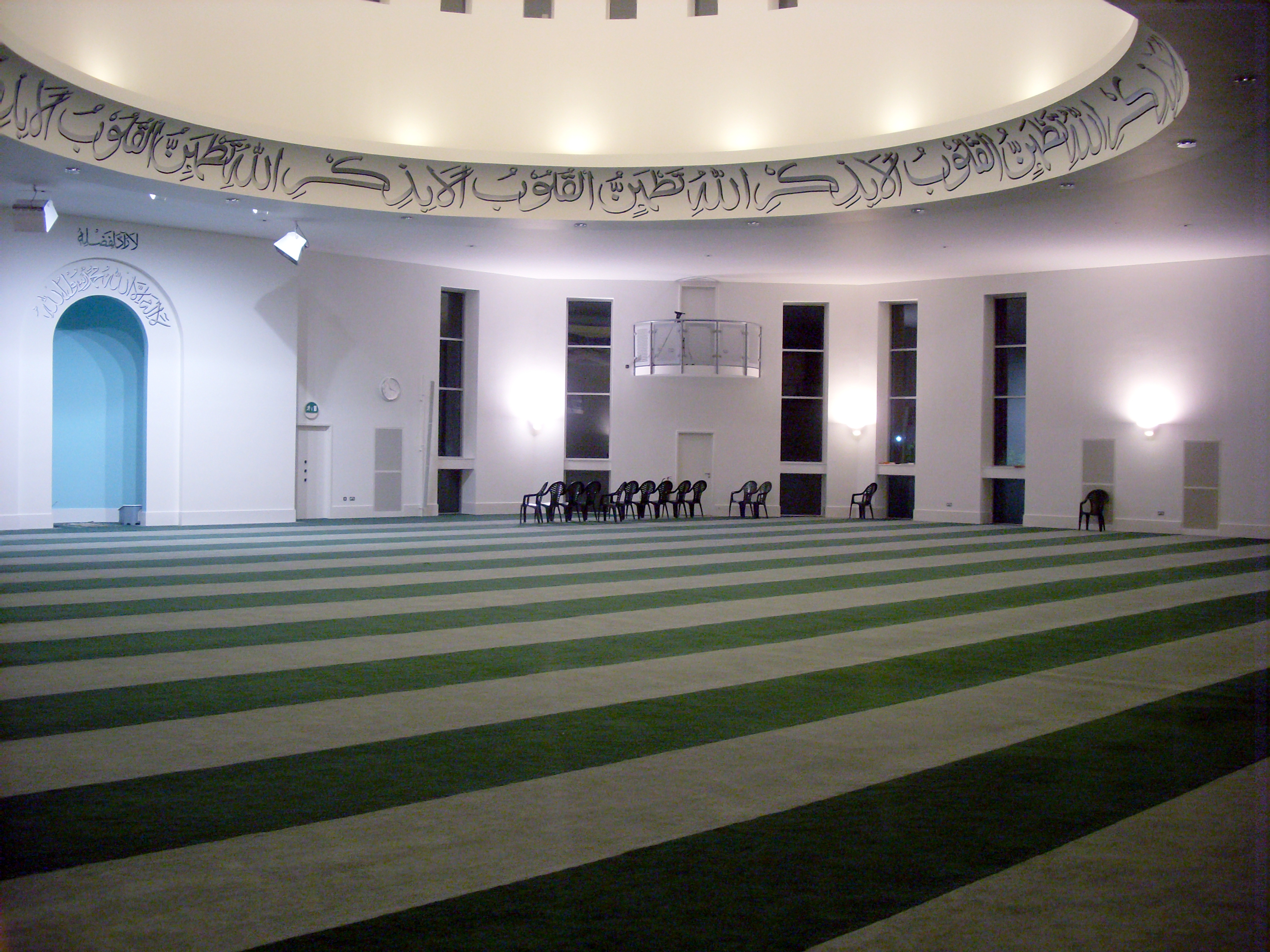
View of men's prayer hall and dome from inside the main mosque (2008)

== See also ==
- Ahmadiyya Muslim Community
- MTA International
- The London Mosque (Fazl Mosque)
- Ahmadiyya in the United Kingdom
- Islam in the United Kingdom
- Islamic architecture
- List of Ahmadiyya buildings and structures
