= William Fowkes =

English politician (died 1616)

William Fowkes (died 1616), of Enfield, Middlesex, was an English Member of Parliament (MP).

Fowkes was a Member of the Parliament of England for Lichfield in 1597.

Parliament of England
Preceded by Sir John Wingfield; Richard Broughton	Member of Parliament for Lichfield; 1597; With: Joseph Oldsworth	Succeeded by Anthony Dyott; Robert Browne
