= Richard Plumer =

British politician

Richard Plumer (c.1689–25 November 1750) was a British politician who sat in the House of Commons from 1722 to 1750.

Plumer was the third surviving son of John Plumer, a wealthy London merchant of Blakesware, Hertfordshire, and his wife Mary Hale, daughter of William Hale of King's Walden, Hertfordshire. He had brothers Walter and William Plumer who were also in Parliament. He succeeded to his father's estates in Kent and Surrey in 1719.

Plumer was appointed Lord of Trade in 1721, and a year later at the 1722 general election he was elected Member of Parliament for Lichfield on the interest of the Chetwynd family. He was returned again as MP for Lichfield at the 1722 general election, but in that year was dismissed from his office at the Board of Trade to make way for someone else. He then voted selectively – for the Administration on the civil list arrears in 1729 and on the repeal of the Septennial Act in 1734, but against the Administration on the Hessians in 1730, the army in 1732, and the Excise Bill in 1733. At the 1734 general election he was returned as MP for St Mawes on the recommendation of Walpole. He was re-appointed as Lord of Trade in 1735 and from then on voted consistently with the Administration. In 1741 he was brought in unopposed as MP for Aldburgh and in 1747 returned unopposed for Weymouth and Melcombe Regis.

Plumer was operated on for a stone on 18 November 1750 and died a week later on 25 November unmarried.

Parliament of Great Britain
| Preceded by Walter Chetwynd; Samuel Hill | Member of Parliament for Lichfield; 1722––1734; With: Walter Chetwynd 1722-1731; George Venables-Vernon 1731-1734 | Succeeded by George Venables-Vernon; Rowland Hill |
| Preceded by Henry Vane; William East | Member of Parliament for St Mawes; 1734–1741; With: Henry Vane | Succeeded by James Douglas; Robert Nugent |
| Preceded by William Conolly; Francis Gashry | Member of Parliament for Aldburgh; 1741–1747; With: William Conolly | Succeeded by William Windham; Zachary Philip Fonnereau |
| Preceded by John Tucker; Joseph Damer; John Raymond; James Steuart | Member of Parliament for Weymouth and Melcombe Regis; 1747–1750; With: Welbore Ellis; George Dodington; Edward Hungate Beaghan | Succeeded by Welbore Ellis; Lord John Cavendish; George Dodington; Edward Hungate Beaghan |
