= Arthur Bedell =

Arthur Bedell (fl.1572), of Lichfield, Staffordshire, was an English Member of Parliament (MP).

He was a Member of the Parliament of England for Lichfield in 1572.

Parliament of England
Preceded by Edward Fitzgerald; William Timperley	Member of Parliament for Lichfield; 1572; With: Edward Fitzgerald	Succeeded by Richard Browne; James Weston
