= James Weston (MP) =

English Member of Parliament

James Weston (c. 1525–89), of Lichfield, Staffordshire, was an English Member of Parliament (MP).

He was a Member of the Parliament of England for Lichfield in 1584.

Parliament of England
Preceded by Edward Fitzgerald; Arthur Bedell	Member of Parliament for Lichfield; 1584; With: Richard Browne	Succeeded by Richard Broughton; John Goodman
