= Joseph Oldsworth =

Joseph Oldsworth (born after 1561 - ?), of London and Poulton, Gloucestershire, was an English Member of Parliament (MP).

He was a Member of the Parliament of England for Lichfield in 1597.

Parliament of England
| Preceded by Sir John Wingfield; Richard Broughton | Member of Parliament for Lichfield; 1597; With: William Fowkes | Succeeded by Anthony Dyott; Robert Browne |
