= Pulteney =

Pulteney may refer to:

== Places ==
- Pulteney, New York in the United States
- Pulteney, Wick in Scotland
- Pulteney Street in Adelaide, Australia

== Other uses ==
- Pulteney (surname)
- Pulteney Grammar School in Adelaide, South Australia
- Old Pulteney distillery in Wick, Caithness
