= Walter Chetwynd (Lichfield MP) =

British politician

Walter Chetwynd (c. 1680 – 1732), of Grendon, Warwickshire, was a British politician who sat in the House of Commons from 1715 to 1731. He was appointed Governor of Barbados, but died before he took up residence.

Chetwynd was the eldest son of John Chetwynd of Ludlow, Shropshire and brother of William Chetwynd of Beddington, Surrey. He married Barbara Goring, daughter of John Goring of Kingston, Staffordshire. In 1719, he succeeded to the Grendon estate of his grandfather, Charles Chetwynd of Grendon.

Chetwynd was returned as a Whig Member of Parliament for Lichfield at the 1715 general election, and spoke and voted against the septennial bill. He was appointed paymaster of the pensions in 1718 and afterwards supported the Administration consistently. At the by-election on 18 March 1718, which was required on his appointment to the post, he was initially defeated, but was returned on petition on 10 December 1718. He was re-elected at the general elections of 1722 and 1727. In 1731, he was in a financially straitened situation and resigned his seat to take the post of Governor of Barbados at £2,000 a year.

As he was preparing to set out for the West Indies, he died on 5 February 1732. His funeral was delayed by the bailiffs. He left two sons, Walter who died in 1750 and William Henry who died without issue. William Henry Chetwynd is said to have left Grendon to his cousin Lady Robert Bertie. The hall remained in the Chetwynd family until the 1930s when it was demolished.

Parliament of Great Britain
Preceded by John Cotes; Richard Dyott	Member of Parliament for Lichfield; 1715–1718; With: Samuel Hill	Succeeded by William Sneyd; Samuel Hill
Preceded by William Sneyd; Samuel Hill	Member of Parliament for Lichfield; 1718–1731; With: Samuel Hill 1718–1722; Richard Plumer 1722–1731	Succeeded by George Venables-Vernon; Richard Plumer
