= John Egerton (died 1614) =

English landowner from the Egerton family and politician

Sir John Egerton (1551 – 28 April 1614) was an English landowner from the Egerton family and politician who sat in the House of Commons at various times between 1601 and 1614. He became one of the leading politicians in Cheshire and Staffordshire.

Egerton was the eldest son of Sir John Egerton of Egerton and Oulton and his wife Jane Mostyn, daughter of Piers Mostyn of Talacre, Flintshire. He was a J.P. for Cheshire by 1587. He succeeded to the estates of his father in 1591 and subsequently purchased the Wrinehill estate in Staffordshire from his cousin Edward Egerton, later to be a major beneficiary under his will. He was knighted in Dublin in 1599, during a brief residence there. He was custos rotulorum by 1601. In 1601, he was elected Member of Parliament for Staffordshire. He was commissioner for musters in 1601 and became high steward of Tamworth in 1602. He was elected MP for Staffordshire again in a by-election in 1607. In 1614 he was elected MP for Lichfield for the Addled Parliament, but died a few weeks later. Despite his double family tie to the Roman Catholic conspirator Sir William Stanley (each married the other's sister), his own family remained in high favour (his cousin Thomas Egerton, 1st Viscount Brackley, was one of the leading figures at Court), and neither his Protestant faith nor his loyalty to the Crown was ever questioned.

Egerton died at his house in Bassinghall Street in the City of London at the age of about 62, probably from kidney disease.

Egerton married firstly Margaret Stanley, daughter of Sir Rowland Stanley, of Hooton, Cheshire, and his wife Margaret Aldersey, and thus a sister of the renegade soldier and conspirator Sir William Stanley, and had five sons and six daughters, most of whom lived to be adults. Margaret seems to have died in 1595. He married secondly after February 1598, Anne Trappes (died 1619), widow of Francis Trappes, a London goldsmith, and of Sir William Blount, and daughter of Robert Barnard (or Byrnand) of Knaresborough, who brought him a comfortable fortune, and a London townhouse on Bassinghall Street.

He was the father of Roland Egerton who became a baronet. Roland was greatly troubled by litigation after his father's death, in particular over the validity of his father's last will and testament, which left a substantial part of the estate to his cousin Edward Egerton of Wrinehill. A younger son John was killed in a duel with Edward Morgan of Flintshire, with whom the Egerton family had a long-standing quarrel, in 1610. After strenuous efforts by Sir John to obtain justice for his son, in which he was assisted by his powerful cousin Lord Chancellor Brackley, Morgan was eventually convicted of murder, but obtained a royal pardon. A third son Peter married Margaret Hayes, daughter of Sir Thomas Hayes, who was Sheriff of London in 1604-5 and Lord Mayor of London in 1614.

Sir John's stepdaughter Ursula Trappes married the prominent judge and politician Lewis Prowde, MP for Shrewsbury in 1614, at whose request Egerton was made an honorary member of Lincoln's Inn in 1602. He was known as "black Sir John".

Parliament of England
Preceded by Hon. John Dudley; Sir Christopher Blount	Member of Parliament for Staffordshire; 1601; With: Sir Thomas Gerard	Succeeded by Sir Edward Littleton; Sir Robert Stanford
Preceded by Sir Edward Littleton; Sir Robert Stanford	Member of Parliament for Staffordshire; 1607–1611; With: Sir Edward Littleton	Succeeded by Walter Chetwynd; Thomas Crompton
Preceded by Anthony Dyott; Thomas Crewe	Member of Parliament for Lichfield; 1614; With: William Wingfield	Succeeded by Anthony Dyott; William Wingfield
