= Richard Dyott (died 1660) =

English lawyer and politician

Sir Richard Dyott (c. 1591 – 8 March 1660) was an English lawyer and politician who sat in the House of Commons between 1623 and 1640. He was a Royalist during the English Civil War.

Dyott was the son of Anthony Dyott, Member of Parliament of Freeford Manor, near Lichfield. He was admitted to Inner Temple in 1615, and became Recorder of Stafford in 1624.

In 1623 Dyott was elected Member of Parliament for Stafford for two parliaments, and then in 1625 was elected Member of Parliament for Lichfield. He held the seat until 1629 when King Charles I decided to rule without parliament. In April 1640 he was re-elected for Lichfield for the Short Parliament.

Dyott was knighted and was a member of the privy council of King Charles at York. He was High Steward of Lichfield and Chancellor of the County Palatine of Durham.

Dyott died at the age of 69.

Dyott married Dorothy Dorrington, daughter of Richard Dorrington of Stafford and had six sons. Three of them fought for the Royalists and one was killed in action. His son Richard was also Member of Parliament for Lichfield.

Parliament of England
Preceded by Sir Walter Devereux; Thomas Gibbs	Member of Parliament for Stafford; 1621–1624; With: Matthew Craddock	Succeeded by Matthew Craddock; Sir John Offley
Preceded by Sir Simon Weston; William Wingfield	Member of Parliament for Lichfield; 1625–1629; With: William Wingfield 1625–1626; Sir William Walter 1628–1629	Parliament suspended until 1640
Vacant Parliament suspended since 1629	Member of Parliament for Lichfield; 1640; With: Sir Walter Devereux	Succeeded by Sir Richard Cave; Michael Noble
