= Thomas Anson (politician, died 1773) =

British Member of Parliament (c. 1695 – 1773)

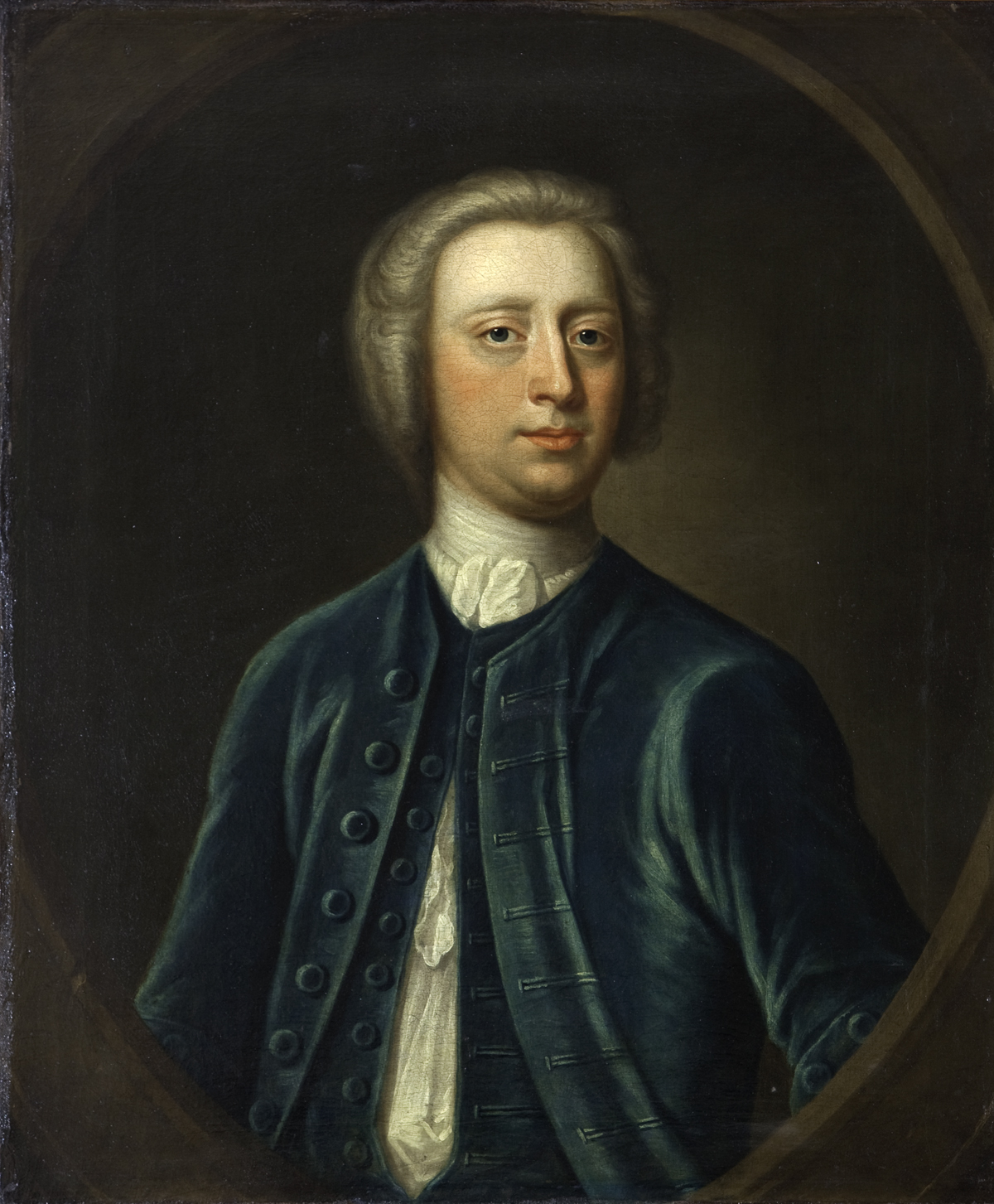
- Thomas Anson.

Member of the Great Britain Parliament for Lichfield
- In office 1747–1770
- Preceded by: George Venables-Vernon; Sir Lister Holte, 5th Baronet
- Succeeded by: Thomas Gilbert; George Anson (Adams)

Personal details
- Born: c. 1695
- Died: 30 March 1773
- Relations: George Anson (brother); George Adams (nephew)
- Profession: Traveller, architect

Thomas Anson, FRS (c. 1695 – 30 March 1773) was a British Member of Parliament, traveller and amateur architect from the Anson family.

== Biography ==
Anson was the son of William Anson (1656–1720) and Isabella Carrier, sister-in-law to Thomas Parker, 1st Earl of Macclesfield. The family estate was Shugborough Hall in Staffordshire. Admiral George Anson, 1st Baron Anson was his younger brother and along with their cousin, George Parker, 2nd Earl of Macclesfield, they were taught mathematics and navigation by Isaac Newton's friend, the mathematician William Jones, who was later to propose Anson's membership for the Royal Society in 1730. Anson went up to St John's College, Oxford, and later studied law at the Inner Temple.

Upon his father's death, Anson abandoned law and began the first of many travels to the continent, as was then the fashion for young men of fortune and taste. In 1732 Anson and his friend the Earl of Sandwich formed a riotous dining-club called the Society of the Dilettanti, which also had the more serious purpose of encouraging study of Greek architecture. In 1740 Thomas briefly joined his brother George on The Centurion, as he and his crew began their circumnavigation of the globe. Anson left them in order to travel to Egypt. This qualified him for the Egyptian Society and the Divan Society, the latter being a wild drinking-club of which Lord Dashwood and Lady Mary Wortley Montagu were avid members.

He was elected to the House of Commons for Lichfield in 1747, a seat he held until 1770.

In 1748 Anson was sent to Versailles by Lord Sandwich with secret correspondence for the Duc de Choiseul and Madame de Pompadour. In Paris he bought crayons for his friend the Duchess of Bedford, and his sister-in-law, Lady Anson, sent him a long list of presents she desired.

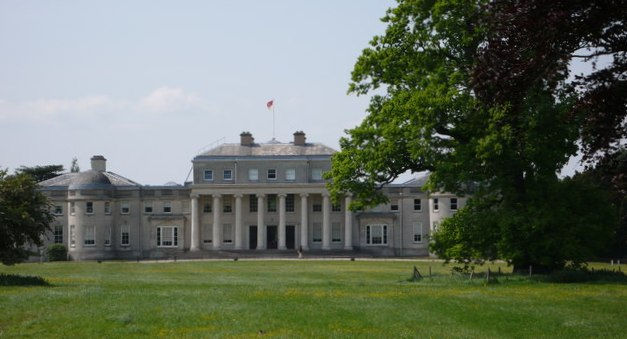
Shugborough Hall, Staffordshire

In 1762 he succeeded to the vast fortune of Spanish treasure amassed by his admiral brother. This enabled him to further indulge his passion for architecture at Shugborough. Anson and another member of the Society of the Diletantti rebuilt the house in the Greek revival style that the pair were championing in England. Anson filled Shugborough with paintings, books and objets d'art, and had Vasalli paint allegories upon the ceilings. The park was strewn with temples and follies, including the mysterious Shepherd's Monument, the Pagoda, Pigeon House and the Tower of the Winds. The park has been described by some as a metaphor for Lord Anson's circumnavigation of the globe. Others contend that it engages aspects of many cultures, both as a tribute to Admiral Anson's voyage, and as a representation of Thomas Anson's interest in syncretic philosophies.

Anson died unmarried in March 1773. The Anson estates were passed on to his nephew, George Adams, who assumed the surname of Anson and was ancestor of the Earls of Lichfield.

== Notes ==
Parliament of Great Britain
Preceded by George Venables-Vernon; Sir Lister Holte	Member of Parliament for Lichfield; 1747–1770; With: Richard Leveson-Gower 1747–1753; Sir Thomas Gresley 1753; Henry Vernon 1754, 1755–1761; Viscount Trentham 1754–1755; John Levett 1761–1762; Hugo Meynell 1762–1768; Thomas Gilbert 1768–1773	Succeeded by Thomas Gilbert; George Anson
