= James Weston =

James Weston may refer to:

- James A. Weston (1827–1895), American civil engineer, banker, and politician
- Jimmy Weston (born 1955), English footballer
- James Weston (MP) for Lichfield
