= Lichfield (constituency) =

UK Parliament constituency (since 1997)

- County constituency for the House of Commons
- Boundaries since 2024
- Boundary of Lichfield in West Midlands region
- County: Staffordshire
- Electorate: 74,942 (2023)
- Major settlements: Lichfield, Burntwood, Handsacre, Barton-under-Needwood

Current constituency
- Created: 1997
- Member of Parliament: David Robertson (Labour)
- Seats: One
- Created from: Mid Staffordshire, Cannock & Burntwood, South East Staffordshire and Burton

1885–1950
- Seats: One
- Type of constituency: County constituency
- Replaced by: Lichfield and Tamworth (Majority), Birmingham Perry Barr (Part), West Bromwich (Part)

1305–1885
- Seats: Two until 1868, then One
- Type of constituency: Borough constituency

Lichfield is a constituency (Note: A county constituency (for the purposes of election expenses and type of returning officer) Before 1885 Lichfield was a parliamentary borough as an original a borough constituency.) in Staffordshire represented in the House of Commons of the UK Parliament since 2024 by David Robertson of the Labour Party.

== Constituency profile ==
Lichfield is a mostly rural constituency in Staffordshire. Its largest settlement is the small city of Lichfield, which has a population of around 34,000. Other settlements include the town of Burntwood and the villages of Fradley, Alrewas, Barton-under-Needwood and Armitage. Lichfield is a historic city and traditionally an important ecclesiastical centre due to its cathedral. Burntwood is a former coal mining town. The constituency is affluent with low levels of deprivation, especially so in the rural areas. House prices are higher than the rest of the West Midlands region and similar to the national average.

In general, residents of the constituency are older, more religious and have average levels of education compared to the rest of the country. Rates of income, homeownership and professional employment are high. A high proportion of residents work in the manufacturing and transport sectors. Very few residents claim unemployment benefits and the rate of child poverty is low. White people made up 96% of the population at the 2021 census. At the local district council level, Lichfield is represented by a mixture of Liberal Democrat and Labour Party councillors, Burntwood elected Labour Party representatives and the rural areas elected Conservatives. At the county council, which held elections in 2025, there was support for Reform UK in Burntwood and the rural areas. An estimated 58% of voters in the constituency supported leaving the European Union in the 2016 referendum, higher than the nationwide figure of 52%.

== Boundaries ==
1918–1950 The Boroughs of Lichfield and Tamworth, the Urban Districts of Perry Barr and Rugeley, the Rural District of Lichfield, and parts of the Rural Districts of Tamworth and Walsall.

1997–2010 The District of Lichfield wards of All Saints, Alrewas, Armitage with Handsacre, Boney Hay, Central, Chadsmead, Chase Terrace, Chasetown, Colton and Ridwares, Curborough, Hammerwich, Highfield, King's Bromley, Leomansley, Longdon, Redslade, St John's, Stowe, Summerfield, and Whittington, and the Borough of East Staffordshire wards of Bagots and Yoxall.

2010–2024 The District of Lichfield wards of All Saints, Alrewas and Fradley, Armitage with Handsacre, Boley Park, Boney Hay, Burntwood Central, Chadsmead, Chase Terrace, Chasetown, Colton and Mavesyn Ridware, Curborough, Hammerwich, Highfield, King's Bromley, Leomansley, Longdon, St John's, Stowe, Summerfield, and Whittington, and the Borough of East Staffordshire wards of Bagots, Needwood, and Yoxall.

2024–present Further to the 2023 Periodic Review of Westminster constituencies which came into effect for the 2024 general election, the constituency is composed of the following (as they existed on 1 December 2020):

- The Borough of East Staffordshire wards of: Bagots; Needwood; Yoxall.^{1}
- The District of Lichfield wards of: Alrewas & Fradley; Armitage with Handsacre; Boley Park; Boney Hay & Central; Chadsmead; Chase Terrace; Chasetown; Colton & the Ridwares; Curborough; Hammerwich with Wall; Highfield; Leomansley; Longdon; St. John’s; Stowe; Summerfield & All Saints; Whittington & Streethay (polling district AD – comprising the parish of Streethay).

Minor changes to the boundary with Tamworth.

^{1} Following a local government boundary review in which came into effect in May 2023, the part in the Borough of East Staffordshire now comprises the following wards or part wards from the 2024 general election:

- Bagots & Needwood; Blythe (Kingstone parish); Crown (Newborough parish).

== History ==
The city was represented at most parliaments between 1305 (10 years after the Model Parliament), in 1327 and again in 1353, but it then ceased to be represented until the mid 16th century, from when it sent two burgesses as members to Parliament until 1664, when representation was temporarily reduced to one member during The Protectorate (ended 1680), and again in 1868, when representation was permanently reduced to one. The constituency was abolished in 1950 but reconstituted, still as a single-member constituency, in 1997.

== Members of Parliament ==
=== 1305–1660 ===
Parliament	First member	Second member
1313	William of Lichfield	
1320	William the Taverner	
1326–7	Stephen le Blount	
1529	William Paget, 1st Baron Paget	
1547	William Layton, died and replaced by Jan 1552 by Alexander Walker	Edmund Twyneho
1553 (Mar)	Mark Wyrley	William Fitzherbert
1553 (Oct)	Sir Philip Draycott	John Giffard
1554 (Apr)	Henry Vernon	John Taylor
1554 (Nov)	Mark Wyrley	Thomas Edwards
1555	Thomas Edwards	Francis Bulstrode
1558	Robert Weston	Richard Cupper
1559 (Jan)	Sir Henry Paget	Robert Weston
1562–3	Sir Henry Paget	Michael Pulteney
1571	Edward Fitzgerald	William Timperley
1572	Edward Fitzgerald	Arthur Bedell
1584 (Nov)	Richard Browne	James Weston
1586 (Sep)	Richard Broughton	John Goodman
1588 (Oct)	Richard Broughton	Richard Huddleston
1593	Sir John Wingfield	Richard Broughton
1597 (Oct)	Joseph Oldsworth	William Fowkes
1601	Anthony Dyott	Robert Browne
1604	Anthony Dyott	Thomas Crewe
1614	Sir John Egerton, died and replaced by Anthony Dyott	William Wingfield
1621	William Wingfield	Richard Weston
1624	Sir Simon Weston	Sir John Suckling, sat for Middlesex and replaced by William Wingfield
1625	Richard Dyott	William Wingfield
1626	Richard Dyott	William Wingfield
1628	Sir Richard Dyott	Sir William Walter
1629–1640	No Parliaments convened	
1640 (Apr)	Sir Walter Devereux	Sir Richard Dyott
1640 (Nov)	Sir Walter Devereux died 1641 and replaced by Sir Richard Cave, Royalist disabled 1642	Michael Noble
1645	Michael Noble	Michael Biddulph of Elmhurst
1648	Michael Noble, died 1649	Only one member
1653	Lichfield not represented in Barebones Parliament	
1654	Thomas Minors	Only one member
1656	Thomas Minors	Only one member
1659	Daniel Watson of Burton upon Trent	Thomas Minors

=== 1660–1868 ===
Election	First member	First party	Second member	Second party
1660 Apr	Michael Biddulph		Daniel Watson	
1660 May	Thomas Minors		Daniel Watson	
1661	John Lane		Sir Theophilus Biddulph, Bt	
1667	Richard Dyott		Sir Theophilus Biddulph, Bt	
1678	Sir Henry Lyttelton, Bt		Sir Theophilus Biddulph, Bt	
1679 Feb	Sir Henry Lyttelton, Bt		Sir Michael Biddulph, Bt	
1679 Aug	Daniel Finch later 2nd Earl of Nottingham		Sir Michael Biddulph, Bt	
1685	Thomas Orme		Richard Leveson	
1689	Robert Burdett		Sir Michael Biddulph, Bt	
1690	Robert Burdett		Richard Dyott	
1695	Robert Burdett		Sir Michael Biddulph, Bt	
1698	Richard Dyott		Sir Michael Biddulph, Bt	
1701 Jan	Richard Dyott		William Walmisley	
1701	Richard Dyott		Sir Michael Biddulph, Bt	
1705	Richard Dyott		Sir Henry Gough	Tory
1708	John Cotes		Sir Michael Biddulph, Bt	
1710	John Cotes		Richard Dyott	
1715	Walter Chetwynd		Samuel Hill	
1718 Apr	William Sneyd		Samuel Hill	
1718 Dec	Walter Chetwynd		Samuel Hill	
1722	Walter Chetwynd		Richard Plumer	
1731 by-election (Note: The by-election in 1731 was caused by the appointment of Walter Chetwynd as Governor of Barbados)	George Venables-Vernon later Baron Vernon		Richard Plumer	
1734	George Venables-Vernon later Baron Vernon		Rowland Hill	
1741	George Venables-Vernon later Baron Vernon		Sir Lister Holte, Bt	
1747	Richard Leveson-Gower		Thomas Anson	
1753 Nov by-election (Note: The by-election in November 1753 was caused by the death of Richard Leveson-Gower)	Sir Thomas Gresley, Bt (Note: Sir Thomas Gresley's victory at the by-election in November 1753 was overturned on petition on 29 Jan 1754 in favour of Henry Vernon)		Thomas Anson	
1754 Jan	Henry Vernon		Thomas Anson	
1754 Apr	Viscount Trentham later Marquess of Stafford		Thomas Anson	
1755 by-election (Note: The by-election in 1755 was caused when Viscount Trentham succeeded to the peerage as Earl Gower)	Henry Vernon		Thomas Anson	
1761	John Levett (Note: At the general election in 1761, Thomas Anson (MP) and John Levett were declared elected. However, a petition was lodged, and Levett's election was overturned on 1 February 1762 in favour of Hugo Meynell)		Thomas Anson	
Feb 1762	Hugo Meynell		Thomas Anson	
1768	Thomas Gilbert	Whig	Thomas Anson	
1770 by-election (Note: The by-election in 1770 was caused by the resignation of Thomas Anson)	Thomas Gilbert	Whig	George Adams then Anson	Whig
1789 by-election (Note: The by-election in 1789 was caused by the death of George Anson)	Thomas Gilbert	Whig	Thomas Anson later Viscount Anson	Whig
1795 by-election (Note: The by-election in 1795 was caused by the resignation of Thomas Gilbert)	Lord Granville Leveson-Gower later Earl Granville	Whig	Thomas Anson later Viscount Anson	Whig
1799 by-election	Sir John Wrottesley, Bt	Whig	Thomas Anson later Viscount Anson	Whig
1806 Feb by-election (Note: The by-election in February 1806 was caused by the elevation to the peerage of Thomas Anson. Source:"No. 15896". The London Gazette. 4 March 1806. pp. 296–297.)	Sir John Wrottesley, Bt	Whig	Sir George Anson	Whig
1806 Nov	George Granville Venables Vernon	Whig	Sir George Anson	Whig
1831	Sir Edward Scott, Bt	Whig	Sir George Anson	Whig
1837	Lord Alfred Paget	Whig	Sir George Anson	Whig
1841 by-election	Lord Alfred Paget	Whig	Lord Leveson later Earl Granville	Whig
1846 by-election	Lord Alfred Paget	Whig	Edward Lloyd-Mostyn later Baron Mostyn	Whig
1847	Lord Alfred Paget	Whig	Viscount Anson later 2nd Earl of Lichfield	Whig
1854 by-election	Lord Alfred Paget	Whig	The Lord Waterpark	Whig
1856 by-election	Lord Alfred Paget	Whig	Viscount Sandon later Earl of Harrowby	Independent Whig
1859	Lord Alfred Paget	Liberal	Augustus Anson	Liberal
1865	Richard Dyott	Conservative	Augustus Anson	Liberal
1868	Representation reduced to one member			

=== 1868–1885 ===
Election	Member	Party
1868	Richard Dyott continuing	Conservative
1880 by-election	Theophilus John Levett	Conservative
1885	Parliamentary borough abolished	

=== 1885–1950, as Lichfield division of Staffordshire ===
Election	Member	Party	Notes
1885	John Swinburne	Liberal	
1892	Leonard Darwin	Liberal Unionist	
1895	Henry Charles Fulford	Liberal	Election voided on petition
1896 by-election	Courtenay Warner	Liberal	Member for North Somerset (1892–1895)
1916	Courtenay Warner	Coalition Liberal	
Jan 1922	Courtenay Warner	National Liberal	
Nov 1923	Courtenay Warner	Liberal	
Dec 1923	Frank Hodges	Labour	
1924	Roy Wilson	Conservative	
1929	James Lovat-Fraser	Labour	
1931	James Lovat-Fraser	National Labour	Died March 1938
1938 by-election	Cecil Poole	Labour	Contested Birmingham Perry Barr following redistribution
1950	Constituency abolished		

=== Since 1997, as Lichfield county constituency ===
Election	Member	Party	Notes
1997	Michael Fabricant	Conservative	Member for Mid Staffordshire (1992–1997) (Note: Seat included the city of Lichfield (in addition to Rugeley and Stone))
2024	Dave Robertson	Labour	

== Elections ==
=== Elections in the 2020s ===
General election 2024: Lichfield
Party	Candidate	Votes	%	±%
Labour	Dave Robertson	17,232	35.1	+14.3
Conservative	Michael Fabricant	16,422	33.4	−30.1
Reform	Richard Howard	9,734	19.8	New
Liberal Democrats	Paul Ray	3,572	7.3	−3.1
Green	Heather McNeillis	1,724	3.5	+0.3
Independent	Pete Longman	322	0.7	New
Independent	John Madden	98	0.2	−0.9
Majority		810	1.7	
Turnout		49,104	64.5	−6.0
Labour gain from Conservative		Swing	+22.4	

=== Elections in the 2010s ===
General election 2019: Lichfield
Party	Candidate	Votes	%	±%
Conservative	Michael Fabricant	34,844	64.5	+0.9
Labour	Dave Robertson	11,206	20.8	−8.0
Liberal Democrats	Paul Ray	5,632	10.4	+5.4
Green	Andrea Muckley	1,743	3.2	+0.6
Independent	John Madden	568	1.1	New
Majority		23,638	43.7	+8.9
Turnout		53,993	70.5	−1.6
Conservative hold		Swing	+4.6	

General election 2017: Lichfield
Party	Candidate	Votes	%	±%
Conservative	Michael Fabricant	34,018	63.6	+8.4
Labour	Chris Worsey	15,437	28.8	+9.0
Liberal Democrats	Paul Ray	2,653	5.0	−0.6
Green	Robert Pass	1,416	2.6	−1.2
Majority		18,581	34.8	−0.6
Turnout		53,524	72.1	+2.8
Conservative hold		Swing	−0.3	

General election 2015: Lichfield
Party	Candidate	Votes	%	±%
Conservative	Michael Fabricant	28,389	55.2	+0.8
Labour	Chris Worsey	10,200	19.8	0.0
UKIP	John Rackham	8,082	15.7	+10.0
Liberal Democrats	Paul Ray	2,700	5.6	−14.5
Green	Robert Pass	1,976	3.8	New
Class War	Andy Bennetts	120	0.2	New
Majority		18,189	35.4	+1.1
Turnout		51,467	69.3	−1.7
Conservative hold		Swing		

General election 2010: Lichfield
Party	Candidate	Votes	%	±%
Conservative	Michael Fabricant	28,048	54.4	+5.7
Liberal Democrats	Ian Jackson	10,365	20.1	+4.2
Labour	Steve Hyden	10,230	19.8	−12.4
UKIP	Karen Maunder	2,920	5.7	+2.4
Majority		17,683	34.3	+18.1
Turnout		51,563	71.0	+4.32
Conservative hold		Swing	+0.7	

=== Elections in the 2000s ===
General election 2005: Lichfield
Party	Candidate	Votes	%	±%
Conservative	Michael Fabricant	21,274	48.6	−0.5
Labour	Nigel Gardner	14,194	32.4	−6.1
Liberal Democrats	Ian Jackson	6,804	15.6	+4.9
UKIP	Malcolm McKenzie	1,472	3.4	+1.8
Majority		7,080	16.2	+5.6
Turnout		43,744	66.7	+0.8
Conservative hold		Swing	+2.8	

General election 2001: Lichfield
Party	Candidate	Votes	%	±%
Conservative	Michael Fabricant	20,480	49.1	+6.2
Labour	Martin Machray	16,054	38.5	−3.9
Liberal Democrats	Phil Bennion	4,462	10.7	−0.6
UKIP	John Phazey	684	1.6	New
Majority		4,426	10.6	+10.1
Turnout		41,680	65.9	−11.6
Registered electors		63,234		
Conservative hold		Swing	+5.1	

=== Elections in the 1990s ===
General election 1997: Lichfield
Party	Candidate	Votes	%	±%
Conservative	Michael Fabricant	20,853	42.9	–14.1
Labour	Susan Woodward	20,615	42.4	+5.8
Liberal Democrats	Phil Bennion	5,473	11.3	+5.5
Referendum	George Seward	1,652	3.4	New
Majority		238	0.5	–19.9
Turnout		48,593	77.4	–6.2
Registered electors		62,753		+758
Conservative hold		Swing	–10.0	

1992 notional result
Party	Vote	%
Conservative	29,583	57.0
Labour	18,993	36.6
Liberal Democrats	2,970	5.7
Others	312	0.6
Turnout	51,858	83.6
Electorate	61,995	

== Election results 1918–1950 ==
=== Elections in the 1940s ===
General election 1945: Lichfield
Party	Candidate	Votes	%	±%
Labour	Cecil Poole	42,806	55.18	+8.96
National	Beresford Craddock	26,235	33.82	New
Liberal	Richard Anthony Lamb	8,533	11.00	New
Majority		16,571	21.36	
Turnout		77,574	71.52	+7.35
Registered electors				
Labour gain from National Labour		Swing	+16.21	

=== Elections in the 1930s ===
1938 by-election: Lichfield
Party	Candidate	Votes	%	±%
Labour	Cecil Poole	23,586	50.60	+4.38
National Labour	Beresford Craddock	22,760	48.82	−4.96
Majority		826	1.77	
Turnout		46,616	68.49	+4.32
Labour gain from National Labour		Swing	+4.96	

General election 1935: Lichfield
Party	Candidate	Votes	%	±%
National Labour	James Lovat-Fraser	23,489	53.78	−9.03
Labour	George Henry Jones	20,191	46.22	+9.03
Majority		3,298	7.56	−18.06
Turnout		43,680	64.17	−9.56
National Labour hold		Swing	−9.03	

General election 1931: Lichfield
Party	Candidate	Votes	%	±%
National Labour	James Lovat-Fraser	26,669	62.81	+20.2
Labour	George Henry Jones	15,790	37.19	−5.41
Majority		10,879	25.62	
Turnout		42,459	73.73	−6.2
National Labour gain from Labour		Swing	+34.11	

=== Elections in the 1920s ===
General election 1929: Lichfield
Party	Candidate	Votes	%	±%
Labour	James Lovat-Fraser	14,965	42.6	−3.6
Unionist	S Samuel	11,511	32.8	−21.0
Liberal	Etienne Bruno de Hamel	8,643	24.6	New
Majority		3,454	9.8	
Turnout		35,119	80.0	−0.3
Registered electors		43,888		
Labour gain from Unionist		Swing	+8.7	

General election 1924: Lichfield
Party	Candidate	Votes	%	±%
Unionist	Roy Wilson	14,588	53.8	+14.1
Labour	Frank Hodges	12,512	46.2	−2.3
Majority		2,076	7.6	
Turnout		27,100	80.3	+10.6
Registered electors		33,751		
Unionist gain from Labour		Swing	+8.2	

General election 1923: Lichfield
Party	Candidate	Votes	%	±%
Labour	Frank Hodges	11,029	48.5	+1.7
Unionist	Roy Wilson	9,010	39.7	New
Liberal	Thomas Morris	2,683	11.8	−41.4
Majority		2,019	8.8	
Turnout		22,722	69.7	+7.7
Registered electors		32,580		
Labour gain from Liberal		Swing	+21.6	

General election 1922: Lichfield
Party	Candidate	Votes	%	±%
National Liberal	Courtenay Warner	10,594	53.2	−10.4
Labour	Walter John French	9,316	46.8	+10.4
Majority		1,278	6.4	
Turnout		19,910	62.0	+10.5
Registered electors		32,100		
National Liberal hold		Swing	−10.4	

=== Elections in the 1910s ===
General election 1918: Lichfield
Party		Candidate	Votes	%
C	National Liberal	Courtenay Warner	9,677	63.6
	Labour	Thomas Riley	5,548	36.4
Majority			4,129	27.2
Turnout			15,225	51.5
Registered electors			29,535	
	National Liberal win (new boundaries)			
C indicates candidate endorsed by the coalition government.

== Election results 1885–1918 ==
=== Elections in the 1910s ===
General Election 1914–15:

Another General Election was required to take place before the end of 1915. The political parties had been making preparations for an election to take place and by July 1914, the following candidates had been selected;

- Liberal: Courtenay Warner
- Unionist: George Coates

General election December 1910: Lichfield
Party	Candidate	Votes	%	±%
Liberal	Courtenay Warner	5,058	54.6	+0.1
Conservative	Arthur Chetwynd	4,213	45.4	–0.1
Majority		845	9.2	+0.2
Turnout		9,271	86.6	–2.8
Liberal hold		Swing	+0.1	

General election January 1910: Lichfield
Party	Candidate	Votes	%	±%
Liberal	Courtenay Warner	5,220	54.5	–9.9
Liberal Unionist	George Coates	4,353	45.5	+9.9
Majority		867	9.0	–19.8
Turnout		9,573	89.4	+6.3
Liberal hold		Swing	–9.5	

=== Elections in the 1900s ===
General election 1906: Lichfield
Party	Candidate	Votes	%	±%
Liberal	Courtenay Warner	5,421	64.4	+9.2
Liberal Unionist	Robert Grosvenor	2,991	35.6	–9.2
Majority		2,430	28.8	+18.4
Turnout		8,412	83.1	+2.1
Registered electors		10,123		
Liberal hold		Swing	+9.2	

Warner

General election 1900: Lichfield
Party	Candidate	Votes	%	±%
Liberal	Courtenay Warner	4,300	55.2	+4.9
Conservative	William Bealey Harrison	3,485	44.8	–4.9
Majority		815	10.4	+9.8
Turnout		7,785	81.0	–4.1
Registered electors		9,608		
Liberal hold		Swing	+4.9	

=== Elections in the 1890s ===
1896 Lichfield by-election
Party	Candidate	Votes	%	±%
Liberal	Courtenay Warner	4,483	53.1	+2.8
Liberal Unionist	Leonard Darwin	3,955	46.9	–2.8
Majority		528	6.2	+5.6
Turnout		8,438	90.3	+5.2
Registered electors		9,348		
Liberal hold		Swing	+2.8	

Fulford

General election 1895: Lichfield
Party	Candidate	Votes	%	±%
Liberal	Henry Fulford	3,902	50.3	+0.4
Liberal Unionist	Leonard Darwin	3,858	49.7	–0.4
Majority		44	0.6	
Turnout		7,760	85.1	+3.7
Registered electors		9,123		
Liberal gain from Liberal Unionist		Swing	+0.4	

- Fulford's election voided on petition

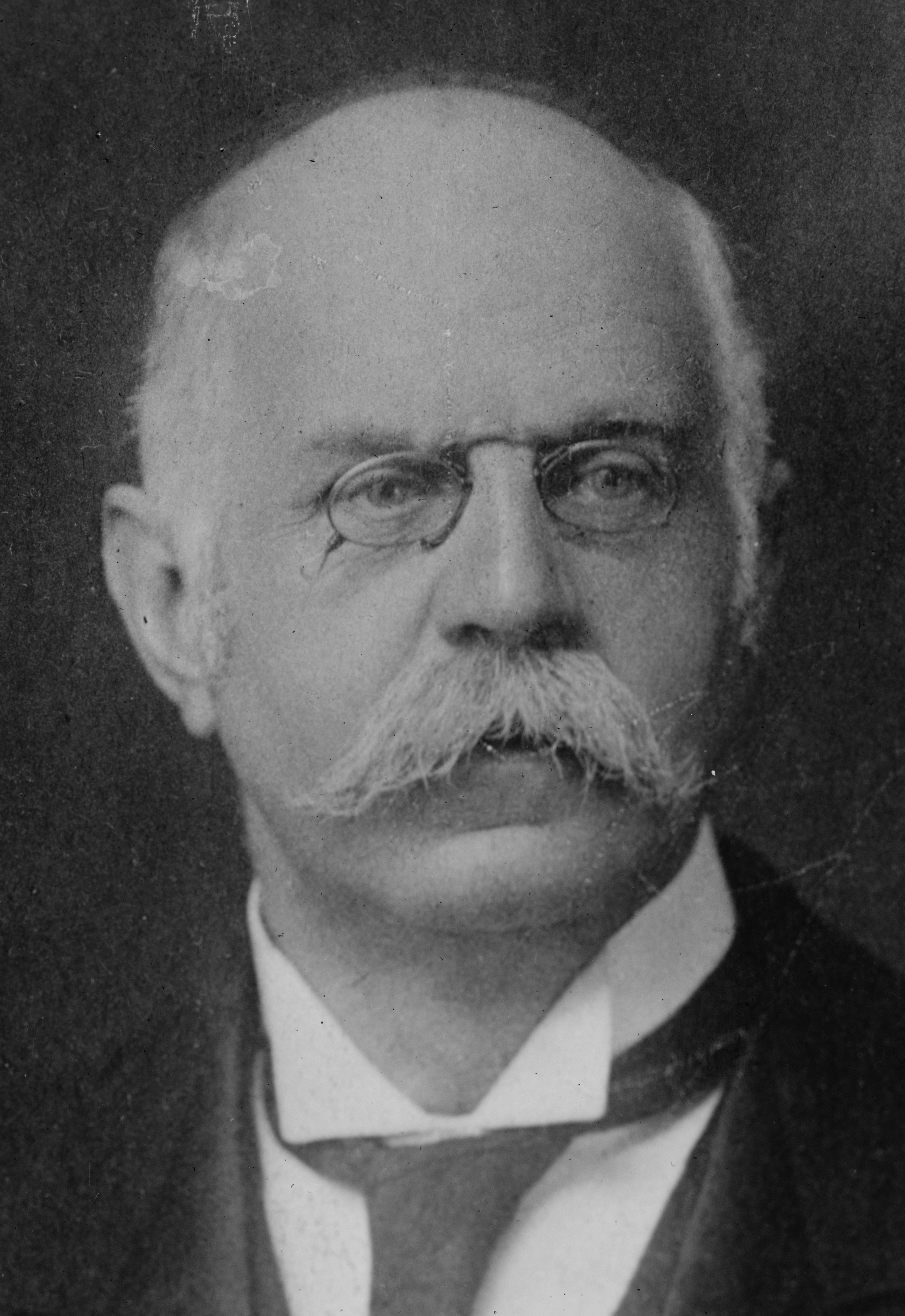
Darwin

General election 1892: Lichfield
Party	Candidate	Votes	%	±%
Liberal Unionist	Leonard Darwin	3,575	50.1	+5.2
Liberal	John Swinburne	3,564	49.9	–5.2
Majority		11	0.2	
Turnout		7,139	81.4	+11.7
Registered electors		8,768		
Liberal Unionist gain from Liberal		Swing	+5.2	

=== Elections in the 1880s ===
General election 1886: Lichfield
Party	Candidate	Votes	%	±%
Liberal	John Swinburne	3,398	55.1	–2.7
Liberal Unionist	Thomas Anson	2,765	44.9	+2.7
Majority		633	10.2	–5.4
Turnout		6,163	69.7	–11.0
Registered electors		8,842		
Liberal hold		Swing	–2.7	

General election 1885: Lichfield
Party	Candidate	Votes	%	±%
Liberal	John Swinburne	4,126	57.8	+8.5
Conservative	Tonman Mosley	3,013	42.2	–8.5
Majority		1,113	15.6	
Turnout		7,139	80.7	+1.4
Registered electors		8,842		
Liberal gain from Conservative		Swing	+8.5	

== Election results 1868–1885 ==
=== Elections in the 1880s ===
By-election, 19 Jul 1880: Lichfield
Party	Candidate	Votes	%	±%
Conservative	Theophilus John Levett	578	51.5	+0.8
Liberal	John Swinburne	544	48.5	−0.8
Majority		34	3.0	+1.6
Turnout		1,122	81.7	+2.4
Registered electors		1,374		
Conservative hold		Swing	+0.8	

The 1880 election was declared void on petition.

General election 1880: Lichfield
Party	Candidate	Votes	%	±%
Conservative	Richard Dyott	553	50.7	−5.8
Liberal	John Swinburne	537	49.3	+5.8
Majority		16	1.4	−11.6
Turnout		1,090	79.3	+2.2
Registered electors		1,374		
Conservative hold		Swing	−5.8	

=== Elections in the 1870s ===
General election 1874: Lichfield
Party	Candidate	Votes	%	±%
Conservative	Richard Dyott	571	56.5	+3.9
Liberal	Charles Simpson	440	43.5	−3.9
Majority		131	13.0	+7.8
Turnout		1,011	77.1	+1.4
Registered electors		1,312		
Conservative hold		Swing	+3.9	

=== Elections in the 1860s ===
General election 1868: Lichfield
Party	Candidate	Votes	%	±%
Conservative	Richard Dyott	525	52.6	+19.1
Liberal	Augustus Anson	474	47.4	−19.1
Majority		51	5.2	−1.1
Turnout		999	75.7	−15.2
Registered electors		1,320		
Conservative hold		Swing	+19.1	

== Election results 1832–1868 ==
=== Elections in the 1860s ===
General election 1865: Lichfield
Party	Candidate	Votes	%	±%
Liberal	Augustus Anson	302	39.3	N/A
Conservative	Richard Dyott	257	33.5	N/A
Liberal	Alfred Paget	209	27.2	N/A
Turnout		513 (est)	90.9 (est)	N/A
Registered electors		564		
Majority		45	5.8	N/A
Liberal hold		Swing	N/A	
Majority		48	6.3	N/A
Conservative gain from Liberal		Swing	N/A	

=== Elections in the 1850s ===
By-election, 6 July 1859: Lichfield
Party	Candidate	Votes	%	±%
Liberal	Alfred Paget	Unopposed		
Liberal hold				

Paget was appointed Chief Equerry and Clerk Marshal to Queen Victoria, requiring a by-election.

General election 1859: Lichfield
Party	Candidate	Votes	%	±%
Liberal	Alfred Paget	Unopposed		
Liberal	Augustus Anson	Unopposed		
Registered electors		737		
Liberal hold				
Liberal gain from Independent Whig				

General election 1857: Lichfield
Party	Candidate	Votes	%	±%
Whig	Alfred Paget	Unopposed		
Independent Whig	Dudley Ryder	Unopposed		
Registered electors		600		
Whig hold				
Independent Whig gain from Whig				

By-election, 30 May 1856: Lichfield
Party	Candidate	Votes	%	±%
Independent Whig	Dudley Ryder	Unopposed		
Independent Whig gain from Whig				

Cavendish resigned, causing a by-election.

By-election, 9 May 1854: Lichfield
Party	Candidate	Votes	%	±%
Whig	Henry Cavendish	Unopposed		
Whig hold				

Anson succeeded to the peerage, becoming 2nd Earl of Lichfield, causing a by-election.

By-election, 5 January 1853: Lichfield
Party	Candidate	Votes	%	±%
Whig	Alfred Paget	Unopposed		
Whig hold				

Paget was appointed Chief Equerry and Clerk Marshal to Queen Victoria, requiring a by-election.

General election 1852: Lichfield
Party	Candidate	Votes	%	±%
Whig	Thomas Anson	369	40.4	N/A
Whig	Alfred Paget	320	35.0	N/A
Conservative	Robert Bayly Follett	224	24.5	N/A
Majority		96	10.5	N/A
Turnout		569 (est)	68.0 (est)	N/A
Registered electors		836		
Whig hold		Swing	N/A	
Whig hold		Swing	N/A	

=== Elections in the 1840s ===
General election 1847: Lichfield
Party	Candidate	Votes	%	±%
Whig	Thomas Anson	Unopposed		
Whig	Alfred Paget	Unopposed		
Registered electors		947		
Whig hold				
Whig hold				

By-election, 15 July 1846: Lichfield
Party	Candidate	Votes	%	±%
Whig	Alfred Paget	Unopposed		
Whig hold				

Paget was appointed Chief Equerry and Clerk Marshal to Queen Victoria, requiring a by-election.

By-election, 31 January 1846: Lichfield
Party	Candidate	Votes	%	±%
Whig	Edward Lloyd-Mostyn	Unopposed		
Whig hold				

Leveson-Gower succeeded to the peerage, becoming 2nd Earl Granville and causing a by-election.

By-election, 15 September 1841: Lichfield
Party	Candidate	Votes	%	±%
Whig	Granville Leveson-Gower	Unopposed		
Whig hold				

Anson resigned by accepting the office of Steward of the Manor of Poynings, causing a by-election.

General election 1841: Lichfield
Party	Candidate	Votes	%	±%
Whig	George Anson	381	40.1	N/A
Whig	Alfred Paget	289	30.4	N/A
Conservative	Richard Dyott	281	29.5	N/A
Majority		8	0.9	N/A
Turnout		572	88.5	N/A
Registered electors		646		
Whig hold		Swing	N/A	
Whig hold		Swing	N/A	

=== Elections in the 1830s ===
General election 1837: Lichfield
Party	Candidate	Votes	%
Whig	George Anson	Unopposed	
Whig	Alfred Paget	Unopposed	
Registered electors		901	
Whig hold			
Whig hold			

General election 1835: Lichfield
Party	Candidate	Votes	%	±%
Whig	George Anson	490	43.1	+7.1
Whig	Edward Scott	414	36.4	−11.5
Radical	Francis Finch	232	20.4	+4.3
Majority		182	16.0	−3.9
Turnout		622	89.5	+24.1
Registered electors		695		
Whig hold		Swing	+2.5	
Whig hold		Swing	−6.8	

General election 1832: Lichfield
Party	Candidate	Votes	%
Whig	Edward Scott	497	47.9
Whig	George Anson	373	36.0
Radical	Francis Finch	167	16.1
Majority		206	19.9
Turnout		563	65.4
Registered electors		861	
Whig hold			
Whig hold			

== Elections before 1832 ==
General election 1831: Lichfield
Party	Candidate	Votes	%	±%
Whig	George Anson	Unopposed		
Whig	Edward Scott	Unopposed		
Registered electors		1,277		
Whig hold				
Whig hold				

General election 1830: Lichfield
Party	Candidate	Votes	%	±%
Whig	George Anson	300	36.7	
Whig	George Venables-Vernon	280	34.2	
Whig	Edward Scott	238	29.1	
Majority		42	5.1	
Turnout		525		
Whig hold		Swing		
Whig hold		Swing		

== See also ==
- List of parliamentary constituencies in Staffordshire
- List of parliamentary constituencies in West Midlands (region)

== Sources ==
- Stooks Smith, Henry. (1973) [1844–1850]. Craig, F. W. S. (ed.). The Parliaments of England (2nd ed.). Chichester: Parliamentary Research Services. pp. 297–299. ISBN 0-900178-13-2.
- Craig, F. W. S. (1989) [1977]. British parliamentary election results 1832–1885 (2nd ed.). Chichester: Parliamentary Research Services. pp. 185–186. ISBN 0-900178-26-4.
- Craig, F. W. S. (1989) [1974]. British parliamentary election results 1885–1918 (2nd ed.). Chichester: Parliamentary Research Services. p. 388. ISBN 0-900178-27-2.
- Craig, F. W. S. (1983) [1969]. British parliamentary election results 1918–1949 (3rd ed.). Chichester: Parliamentary Research Services. p. 464. ISBN 0-900178-06-X.
