= William Sneyd (MP for Lichfield) =

English politician

William Sneyd (c. 1693 – 11 February 1745) was an English politician who briefly sat in the House of Commons in 1718 as Member of Parliament for Lichfield.

Sneyd was educated at Clare College, Cambridge, graduating in 1710. He also attended the Middle Temple, being called to the bar in 1719. He was elected on 24 April 1718 "by a very great mob with papers in their hats resembling white roses, headed by the same person that was captain of the famous riots at West Bromwich". However, Sneyd was unseated on petition on 10 December.

His cousin Ralph Sneyd was MP for Staffordshire from 1713 to 1715.

== Notes ==
Parliament of England
Preceded by Walter Chetwynd; Samuel Hill	Member of Parliament for Lichfield; 1718; With: Samuel Hill	Succeeded by Walter Chetwynd; Samuel Hill
