= Oldsworth =

Oldsworth is a surname. Notable people with the surname include:

- Arnold Oldsworth (born 1561), English politician and lawyer
- Joseph Oldsworth, English MP
- Richard Oldsworth (1590–1649), English academic theologian
- William Oldsworth (died 1603), English politician
