= Richard Weston (Royalist) =

English judge and politician

Sir Richard Weston (1579–1658) was an English judge and politician who sat in the House of Commons variously between 1614 and 1642. He fought on the Royalist side for King Charles during the English Civil War.

Weston was the son of Ralph Weston of Rugeley, Staffordshire and his wife Ann Smith. He was educated at Exeter College, Oxford and was then called to the Bar by Inner Temple in 1607, becoming a bencher in 1626. Weston became member of parliament (MP) for Lichfield in 1614 and was re-elected in 1622. He was appointed judge on the Welsh circuit in 1632 and became serjeant at law in 1632/33. He became puisne Baron of the Exchequer in 1634 and was knighted in 1635. He built Hagley Hall, Rugeley.

Weston was impeached in 1641 for his arguments in favour of ship money. He was not tried, but joined the army of King Charles with his eldest son Richard in August 1642. In September 1643, Weston was at Shrewsbury with his brother Simon, a draper who supplied considerable quantities of clothing to the King's forces. He received a summons from the King to Oxford on 30 September. By vote of the House of Commons, Sir Richard was disabled from acting as judge on 24 October 1645. He was at Oxford when the garrison surrendered in 1646, and he received a Safe-Conduct from Thomas Fairfax and signed by him.

Weston married Ann Barbour, daughter of Richard Barbour of Hilderstone, Staffs. He died at Rugeley and was buried on 4 March 1658.

Weston's son Richard was also an MP, who in April 1640 was elected MP for Stafford for the Short Parliament. He was re-elected MP for Stafford in November 1640 for the Long Parliament. He was a Royalist soldier and fled to the Isle of Man after the defeat at Oxford with Ralph Sneyd and James Rugeley where they were welcomed by the King and were believed to be present when Lord Derby responded to Oliver Cromwell's terms. The younger Richard Weston was taken prisoner at Colchester in July 1648 and was killed in the King's service in the Isle of Man in 1652.

Parliament of England
Preceded by Anthony Dyott; William Wingfield	Member of Parliament for Lichfield; 1621–1624; With: William Wingfield	Succeeded by Sir Simon Weston; William Wingfield
