= William Timperley =

William Timperley may refer to the following:

- William Timperley (politician) (1525–1606), English politician, MP for Lichfield
- William Timperley (magistrate) (1833–1909; William Henry Timperley), Australian politician, author, policeman
