= George Venables-Vernon, 1st Baron Vernon =

British politician (1709–1780)

The Right Honourable The Lord Vernon
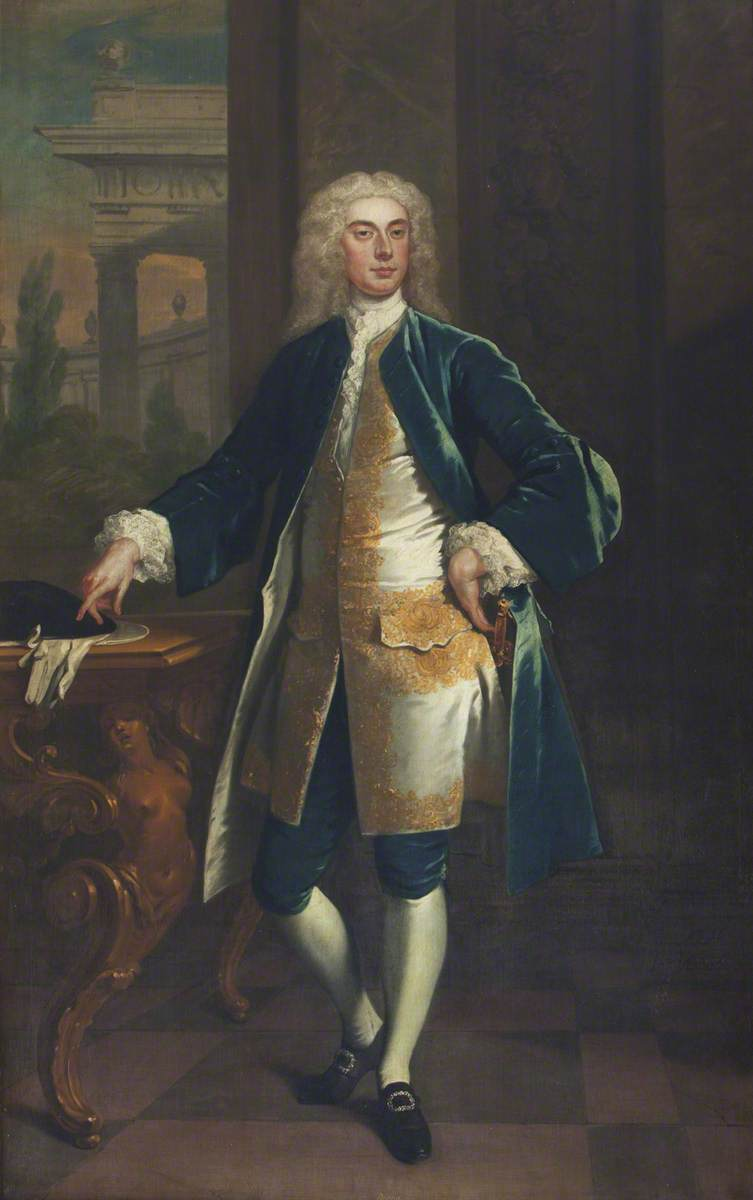
- Portrait of Venables-Vernon, by John Vanderbank, 1736

Member of the British Parliament for Lichfield
- In office 1731–1747 Serving with Richard Plumer, Sir Rowland Hill, Sir Lister Holte
- Preceded by: Walter Chetwynd; Richard Plumer
- Succeeded by: Richard Leveson-Gower; Thomas Anson

Member of the British Parliament for Derby
- In office 1754–1762 Serving with Lord Frederick Cavendish
- Preceded by: Viscount Duncannon; Thomas Rivett
- Succeeded by: Lord Frederick Cavendish; William Fitzherbert

Personal details
- Born: George Vernon; 9 February 1709
- Died: 21 August 1780 (aged 71)
- Spouses: Hon. Mary Howard (m. 1733; died 1740) Ann Lee (m. 1741; died 1742) Martha Harcourt (m. 1744; died 1780)
- Children: 9
- Parent(s): Henry Vernon; Anne Pigott

George Venables-Vernon, 1st Baron Vernon (9 February 1709 – 21 August 1780), was a British politician.

== Early life ==
Vernon was born on 9 February 1709. He was the eldest, and only surviving, son of Henry Vernon, of Sudbury, Derbyshire, MP for Staffordshire and Newcastle-under-Lyme, and his wife Anne Pigott, daughter and heiress of Thomas Pigott of Chetwynd by his wife Mary Venables (sister and heiress of Sir Peter Venables of Kinderton, Cheshire).

== Career ==
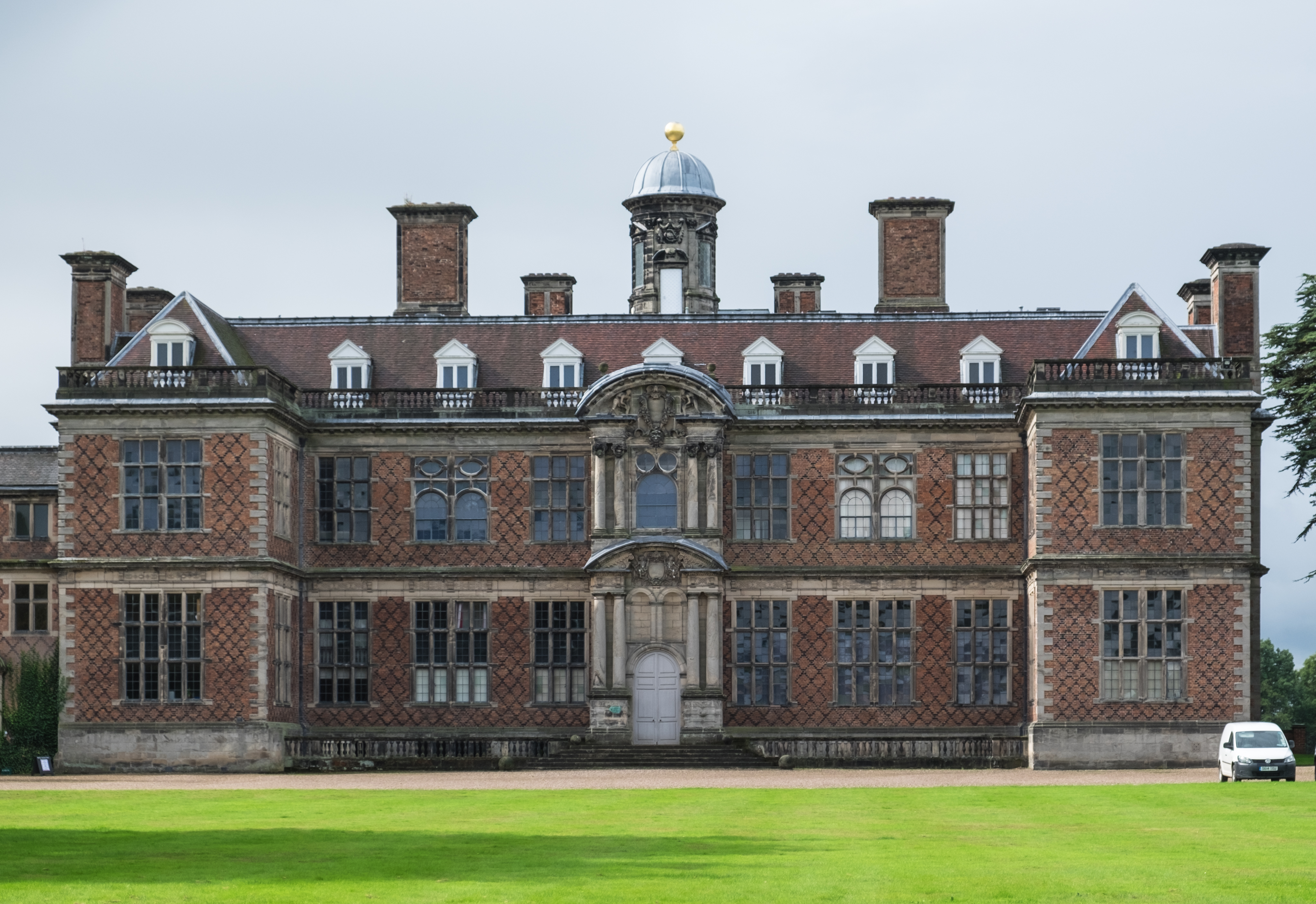
Sudbury Hall

His father died in 1719, leaving him Sudbury Hall, and in 1728 he assumed, by royal licence, the additional surname of Venables after he had succeeded to the Cheshire estates on the death of his cousin, Anne Venables-Bertie, Countess of Abingdon (wife of Montagu Venables-Bertie, 2nd Earl of Abingdon), in accordance with the will of his uncle and her father, Sir Peter Venables.

Vernon began in politics as a Tory, but by 1754 was a supporter of Administration. He sat as a Member of Parliament, as an Anti-Walpole Whig, for Lichfield from 1731 to 1747 and for Derby from 1754 to 1762.

In 1762 he was raised to the peerage as Lord Vernon, of Kinderton, in the County of Chester.

He lived at Sudbury Hall, one the country's finest Restoration mansions, which now is a Grade I listed building.

== Personal life ==
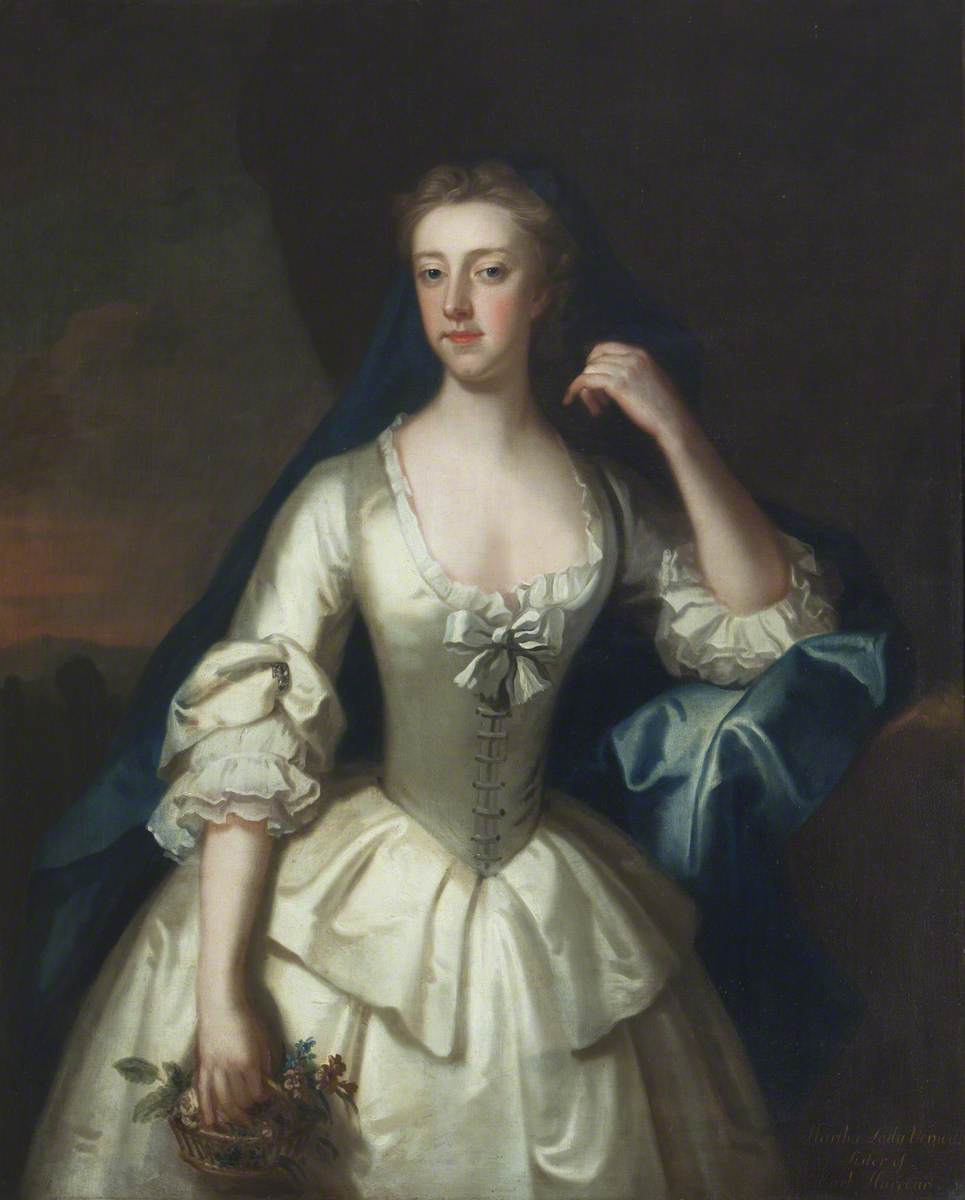
Portrait of his third wife, Martha Harcourt, by Enoch Seeman, c. 1744

Lord Vernon was married three times and several of his descendants gained distinction. He married firstly the Hon. Mary Howard, daughter of Thomas Howard, 6th Baron Howard of Effingham, in 1733. Together they had a son:

- George Venables-Vernon, 2nd Baron Vernon (1735–1813), who married Hon. Louisa Barbara Mansell, only daughter and heiress of Bussy Mansell, 4th Baron Mansell, in 1757. After her death in 1786, he married Jane Georgiana Fauquier, daughter of William Fauquier, of Hanover in 1786.
- Hon. Mary Venables-Vernon, who married George Anson, MP for Saltash and Lichfield, in 1763.

After her death in 1740 he married secondly Ann Lee, daughter of Sir Thomas Lee, 3rd Baronet, of Hartwell, MP for Chipping Wycombe and Buckinghamshire, in 1741. She died shortly thereafter in 1742.

After her death the following year he married, thirdly, Martha Harcourt, daughter of the Hon. Simon Harcourt (a younger son of Simon Harcourt, 1st Viscount Harcourt) and sister to Simon Harcourt, 1st Earl Harcourt, in 1744. Together they had a son:

- Hon. Elizabeth Venables-Vernon (1746–1826), who married her first cousin, George Harcourt, 2nd Earl Harcourt, in 1765.
- Henry Venables-Vernon, 3rd Baron Vernon (1747–1829), who married Elizabeth Rebecca Anne Sedley, illegitimate daughter and testamentary heiress of Sir Charles Sedley, 2nd Baronet, in 1779. After her death in 1793, he married Alice Lucy Whitefoord, second daughter of Sir John Whitefoord, 3rd Baronet, in 1795.
- Hon. William Venables-Vernon, who died young.
- Hon. Catherine Venables-Vernon (1749–1775)
- Hon. Martha Venables-Vernon (b. 1751)
- Hon. Anne Venables-Vernon (1754–1837)
- Edward Venables-Vernon-Harcourt (1757–1847), the Archbishop of York who married Lady Anne Leveson-Gower, third daughter of Granville Leveson-Gower, 1st Marquess of Stafford, by his second wife Lady Louisa Egerton (eldest daughter of Scroop Egerton, 1st Duke of Bridgewater), in 1784. Edward succeeded to the Harcourt estates on the death of his first cousin, William Harcourt, 3rd Earl Harcourt, in 1830. The 11th, and current Baron Vernon, is descended through Edward.

Lord Vernon died in August 1780, aged 71, and was succeeded in the barony by his son from his first marriage, George. His second son from his third marriage, the Most Reverend the Hon. Edward Harcourt (who assumed the surname of Harcourt) became Archbishop of York and was the grandfather of Sir William Vernon Harcourt and the great-grandfather of Lewis Harcourt, 1st Viscount Harcourt.

The widowed Lady Vernon moved to Grosvenor Square. where she lived until her death in 1794.

== Ancestry ==
Ancestors of George Venables-Vernon, 1st Baron Vernon

8. Sir Henry Vernon
4. George Vernon
9. Muriel Vernon
2. Henry Vernon
10. Sir Thomas Vernon
5. Catherine Vernon
11. Ann Weston
1. George Venables-Vernon, 1st Baron Vernon
12. Thomas Pigott
6. Thomas Pigott
13. Anne Sneyd
3. Anne Pigott
14. Thomas Venables
7. Mary Venables
15. Grace Fenwick

Parliament of Great Britain
Preceded by Walter Chetwynd; Richard Plumer	Member of Parliament for Lichfield; 1731–1747; With: Richard Plumer 1731–1734; Sir Rowland Hill 1734–1741; Sir Lister Holte 1741–1747	Succeeded by Richard Leveson-Gower; Thomas Anson
Preceded by Viscount Duncannon; Thomas Rivett	Member of Parliament for Derby; 1754–1762; With: Lord Frederick Cavendish	Succeeded by Lord Frederick Cavendish; William Fitzherbert
Peerage of Great Britain
New creation	Baron Vernon; 1762–1780	Succeeded by George Venables-Vernon
