= Richard Leveson-Gower =

Richard Leveson-Gower (30 April 1726 – 19 October 1753) was the fourth son of John Leveson-Gower, 1st Earl Gower and a member of the Leveson-Gower family.

He served as Member of Parliament for Lichfield from 1747 until his death, aged 27.

Parliament of Great Britain
Preceded by George Venables-Vernon, later Baron Vernon; Sir Lister Holte, Bt	Member of Parliament for Lichfield; Thomas Anson; 1747–1753	Succeeded by Sir Thomas Gresley, 5th Bt; Thomas Anson
