= Cecil Poole =

Cecil Poole may refer to:

- Cecil F. Poole (1914–1997), American lawyer and federal judge
- Cecil Poole (politician) (1902–1956), British politician
