= Edward Garrett =

Edward Garrett may refer to:

- Edward Garrett (MP for Wallsend) (1920–1993), English MP for Wallsend
- Edward Garrett (MP for Lichfield and Great Grimsby) (1528–1590), English MP
- Edward Garrett (writer), Scottish writer and poet

== See also ==
- Eddie Garrett, American actor
