= Simon Weston (MP) =

English politician

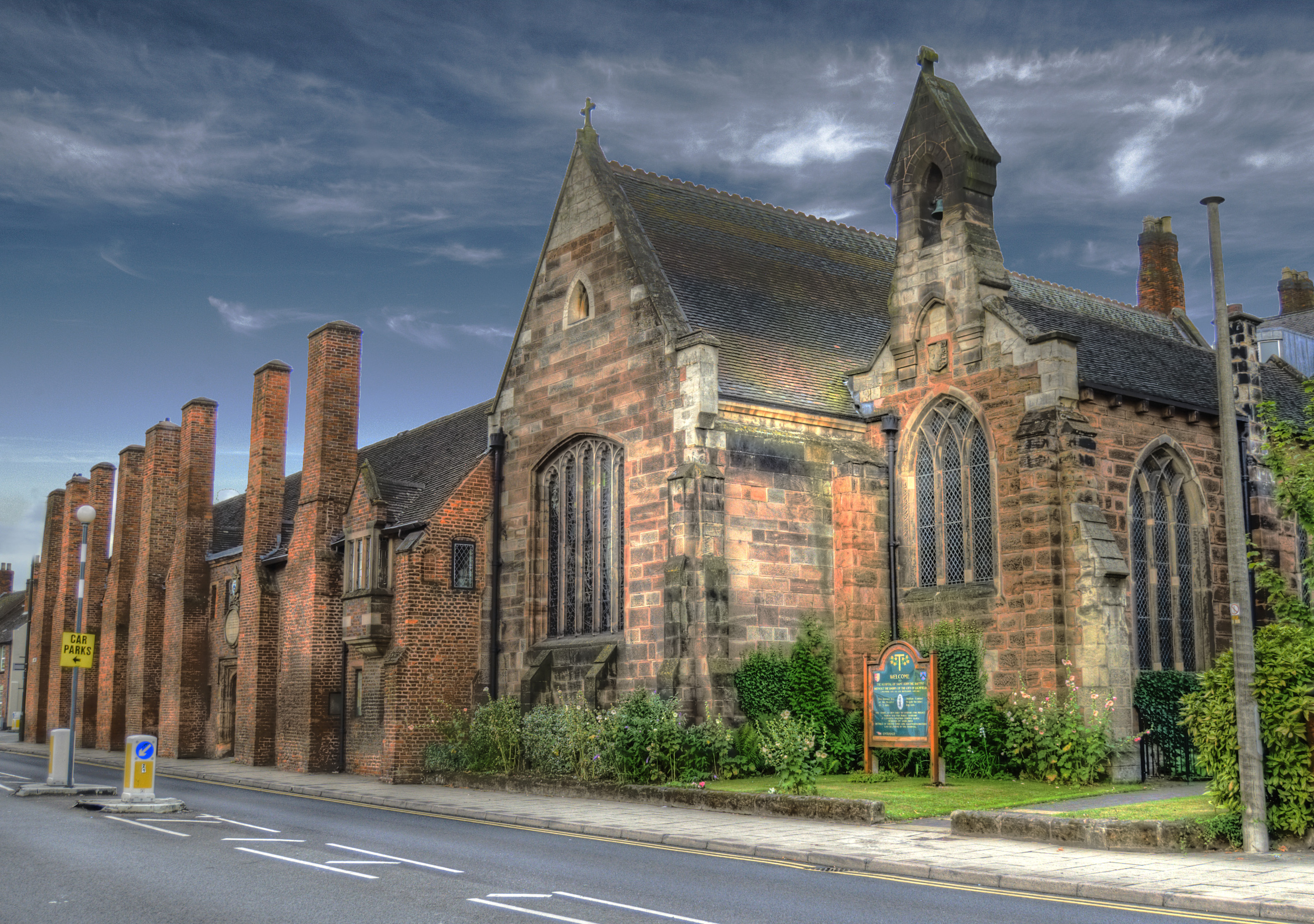
St John's Hospital, seat of the Weston family, in Lichfield

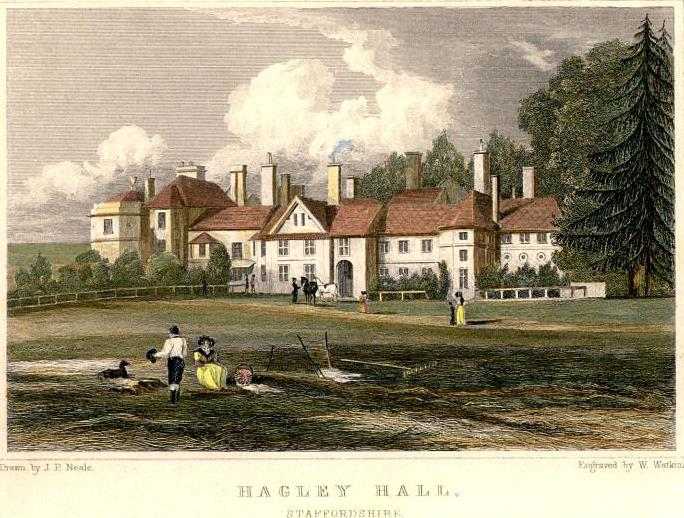
An 1822 engraving of Hagley Hall from the estate side by John Preston Neale, Weston's parent family

Sir Simon Weston (1565–1637) was an English Knight and politician, personal ally of the Earls of Essex, who sat in the House of Commons between 1624 and 1626. He was involved in the Earl's of Essex rebellion against Queen Elizabeth Tudor.

== History ==
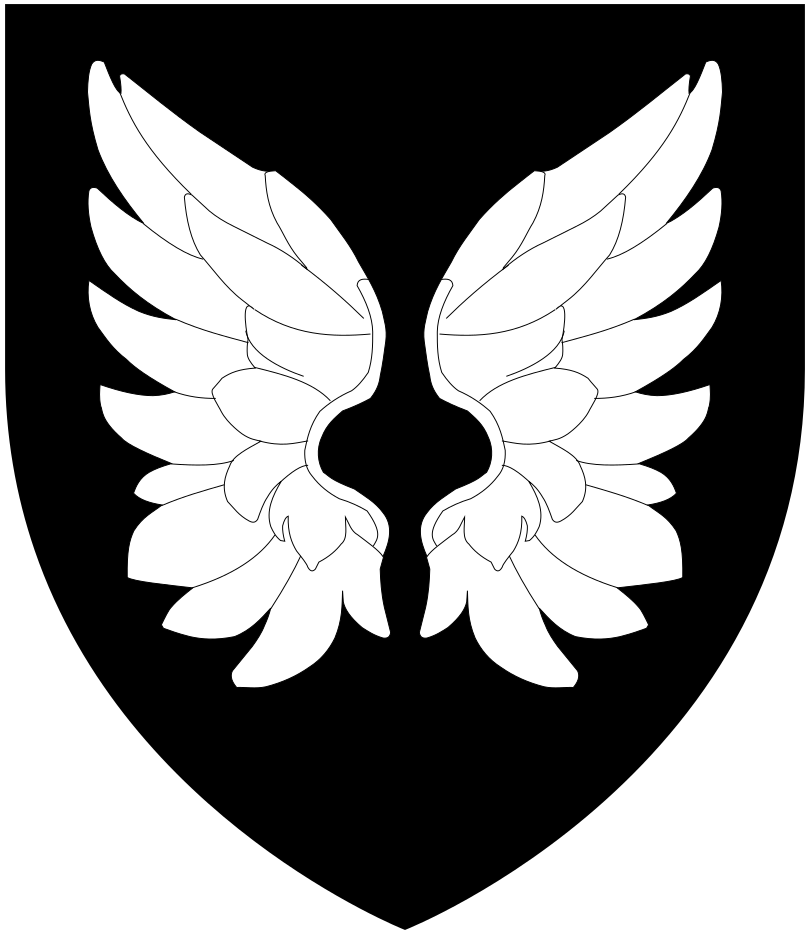
Coat of arms of the Earl of Londonderry, Robert Ridgeway, husband of Elizabeth Weston

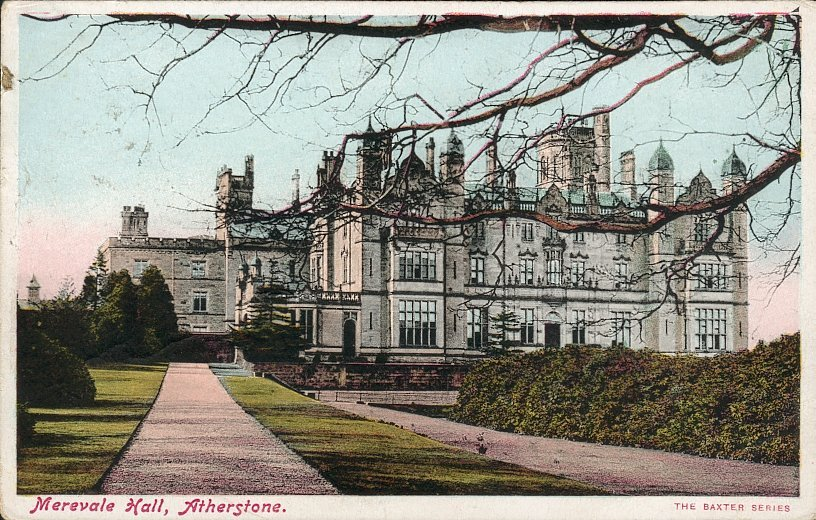
Merevale Hall, estate of Weston's replacement as MP, Sir Edward Littleton

Weston was the son of James Weston, MP for Lichfield, by his wife, Margery Lowe, daughter of Humphrey Lowe of Lichfield, England. He was the nephew of Robert Weston, Lord Chancellor of Ireland under Queen Elizabeth I.

Simon was the grandnephew of Ralph Neville, 4th Earl of Westmorland, and fifth great grandson of John Holland, 2nd Duke of Exeter, son of Elizabeth of Lancaster, Duchess of Exeter, first 'Lady of the Garter (1378), she the daughter of John of Gaunt the third son of Edward III and John's first wife, Blanche of Lancaster, daughter of Henry of Grosmont, Duke of Lancaster, '1st Duke of Lancaster', '4th Earl of Leicester and Lancaster', his wife Isabel of Beaumont.

Elizabeth's first marriage to John Hastings, 3rd Earl of Pembroke, stated to be unconsummated; her second marriage to John Holland, 1st Duke of Exeter produced five children, three of those children living to adulthood with having living progeny.

Weston's cousin, Countess Catherine Fenton Boyle, lived at Lismore Castle.

The Westons, father and son, lived at St John's Hospital in Lichfield, and were a cadet branch of the Westons of Rugeley, which included Sir Richard Weston of Hagley Hall.

In August 1599, Simon was knighted by Robert Devereux, 2nd Earl of Essex, Lord Lieutenant of Staffordshire, who was a Royal favourite at the time.

The Earl's network was very influential, him being a great-grandson of Mary Boleyn, sister of Queen Anne Boleyn. His uncle was married to a cousin of the Queen, while his own wife, Frances Burke, Countess of Clanricarde, was the daughter of the Secretary of State, Sir Francis Walsingham, Elizabeth's spymaster.

Weston was then elected High Sheriff of Staffordshire in 1610. He was later accused of participating in the Earl's of Essex rebellion against Queen Elizabeth Tudor, which involved Henry Wriothesley, 3rd Earl of Southampton, Charles Howard, 1st Earl of Nottingham and Robert Cecil, 1st Earl of Salisbury, among others.

Weston initially evaded capture but was later brought in front of the Privy Council, and given to the custody of his brother-in-law, Bishop Martin Heton, the Vice-Chancellor of the University of Oxford.

== Later history ==
After successfully denying his involvement in the uprising, despite his close relationship with rebel Sir Christopher Blount, he was set free in 1602, and was awarded a Royal Lordship under King James I of England.

In 1607, Weston invited to his home the Secretary of State, Robert Cecil of Hatfield House, son of Lord William Cecil of Burghley House, the Chief minister of Queen Elizabeth Tudor. He married thereafter his only child, Elizabeth Weston, to Robert Ridgeway, son and heir of Thomas Ridgeway, 1st Earl of Londonderry, paying a dowry of £6,000.

His father was well connected with the Earls of Essex as well, as he had previously joined the Essex-Raleigh Expedition, a military campaign against the Habsburgs of Spain and Netherlands. He also held the positions of Vice-Treasurer of Ireland and Treasurer-at-Wars under Lord George Carey.

Robert's sister was Cassandra Ridgeway, and was married to Sir Francis Willoughby, son of Sir Percival Willoughby of Wollaton Hall, and became the grandmother of Cassandra Willoughby, Duchess of Chandos, member of the Willoughby family.

Weston later became Deputy lieutenant and a personal trustee of Robert Devereux, 3rd Earl of Essex, who was also Vice-Admiral and Chief Commander of the Parliamentarian army. In 1622, he succeeded the Earl of Bridgewater, John Egerton of the Egerton family, as Recorder (Judge) of Lichfield, an important judicial office.

In 1624, Weston was elected Member of Parliament for Lichfield, replacing his relative Sir Richard Weston. In 1625 he was elected MP for Staffordshire and was re-elected in 1626, replacing Sir Edward Littleton, of the Lyttelton family of Merevale Hall.

== Family ==
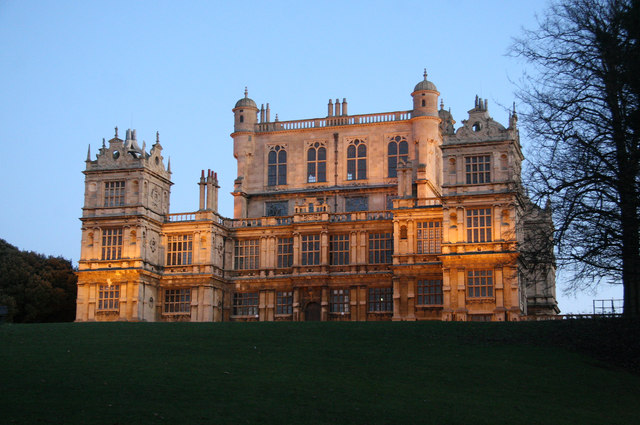
Wollaton Hall, seat of the cousins of the Ridgeway family, the Willoughbys

Weston married Mary Lloyd, daughter of John Lloyd, Judge of the High Court of Admiralty, and co founder with Queen Elizabeth Tudor, of the first Protestant College at the University of Oxford.

Weston's brother-in-law was Chancellor David Yale, spouse of Frances Lloyd, and nephew of Chancellor Thomas Yale of Plas yn Yale, Wales.

Weston's daughter, Elizabeth Weston, married Robert Ridgeway, 2nd Earl of Londonderry, son of Thomas Ridgeway, 1st Earl of Londonderry, and was a member of the Willoughby family. The couple lived at Ridgeway's family seat, Torre Abbey, in Devon.

Elizabeth was the sister-in-law of Sir Francis Willoughby, son of Sir Percival Willoughby, and the aunt of Francis Willughby, and grandaunt of Duchess Cassandra Willoughby, proprietors of Wollaton Hall.

Thereafter, Weston lived in relative obscurity, although around 1632 he reached for help to the Secretary of State, Sir John Coke, on behalf of his daughter Elizabeth and her children, who had been deserted and left unsupported by her husband, Robert Ridgeway, 2nd Earl of Londonderry.

Parliament of England
Preceded by Richard Weston; William Wingfield	Member of Parliament for Lichfield; 1624; With: Sir John Suckling 1624; William Wingfield 1624	Succeeded by Richard Dyott; William Wingfield
Preceded by Sir William Bowyer; Sir Edward Littleton	Member of Parliament for Staffordshire; 1625–1626; With: Richard Erdeswick 1625; Sir William Bowyer 1626	Succeeded by Sir Hervey Bagot, 1st Baronet; Thomas Crompton
