= Blund =

Blund is a surname. Notable people with the surname include:

- John Blund (1175–1248), Archbishop of Canterbury-elect and philosopher
- Robert Blund, Norman Sheriff of Norfolk
- Stephen Blund, MP for Lichfield
