= Thomas Edwards (MP for Lichfield) =

English MP for Lichfield (1554–55)

Thomas Edwards (fl. 1554–1555), was an English Member of Parliament (MP).

He was a Member of the Parliament of England for Lichfield in November 1554 and 1555.
