= Walcot Hall =

Country house in Southorpe, Cambridgeshire, England

Coordinates: 52.6245°N 0.4074°W

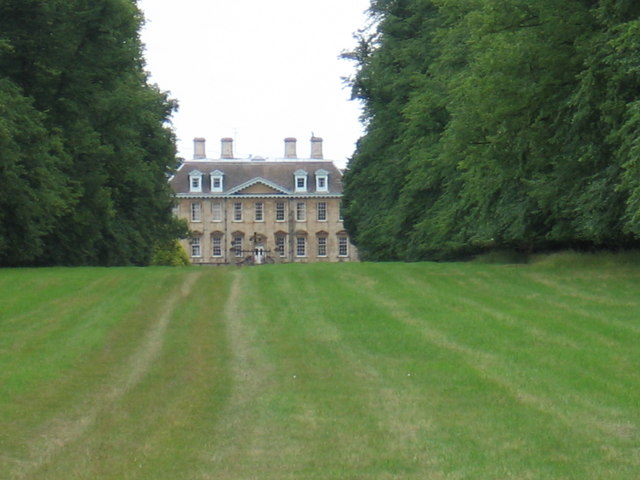
Walcot Hall from the Hereward Way

Walcot Hall is a Grade I listed Carolean country house in the civil parish of Southorpe, Cambridgeshire, England. It lies 2 km (1 mile) south east of the village of Barnack. The house is now within the boundary of the Peterborough unitary authority area of the ceremonial county of Cambridgeshire but it was part of the Soke of Peterborough, an historic area that was traditionally associated with Northamptonshire.

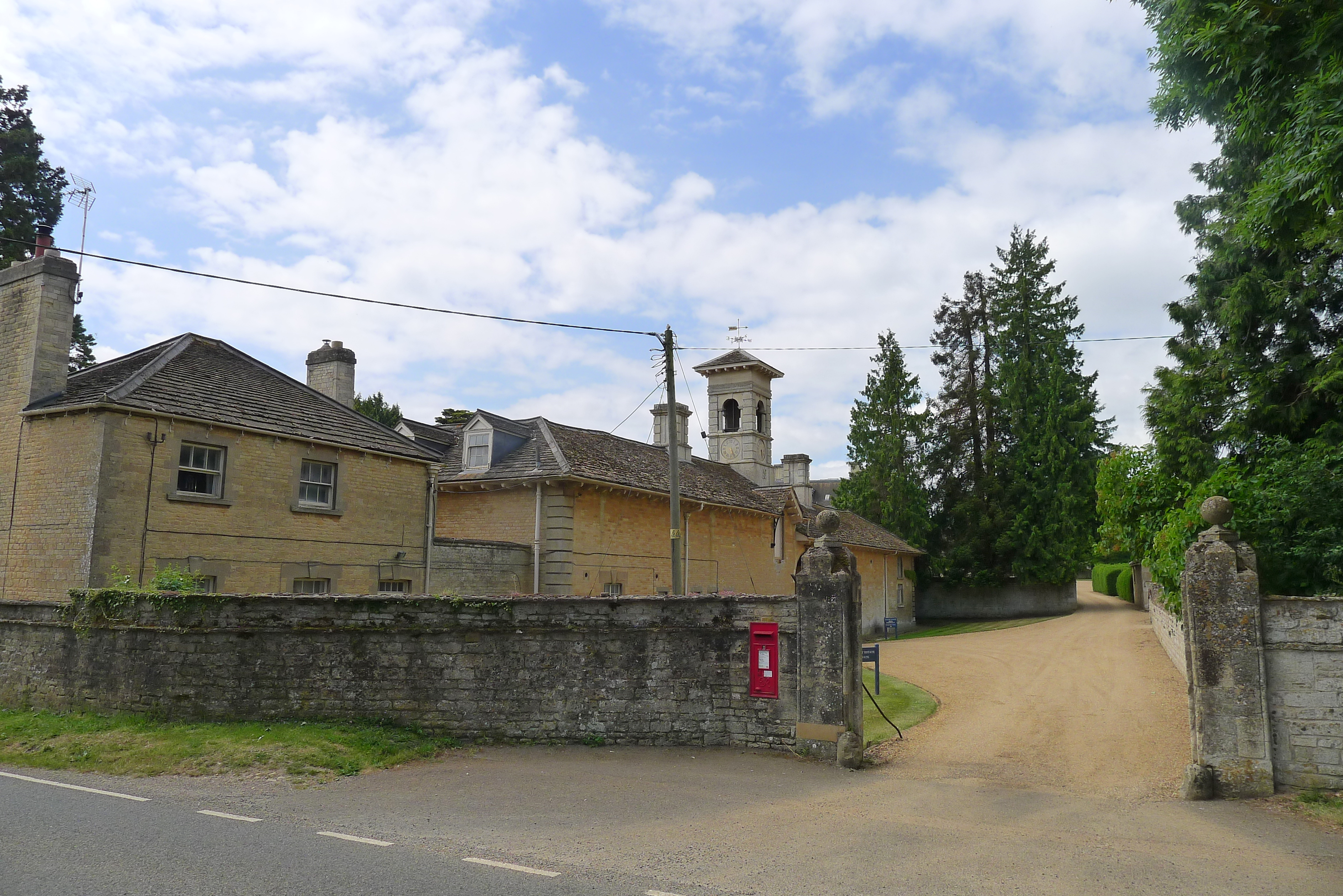
Entrance to the stables of Walcot Hall

The house is constructed of limestone ashlar in two storeys plus attic with a rectangular floor plan of nine bays by five and a Collyweston stone slate hipped roof. It stands in some 120 acres of wooded parkland as part of a 1400-acre agricultural estate. In the grounds are two temples by William Henry Ansell. The stables, north lodge and associated structures are Grade II listed.

== History ==
George Whetstone (1544? – 1587) was an English dramatist and author. He was the third son of Robert Whetstone (d. 1557), a member of a wealthy family that owned the manor of Walcot at Barnack, near Stamford, Lincolnshire. George appears to have had a small inheritance which he soon spent.

The original hall on the site was owned by the Browne family whose members included Robert Browne MP. In 1662 the Brownes sold it to Bernard Walcot, who in turn sold it to Sir Hugh Cholmley, circa 1674. Cholmley built the present house in 1678 in place of the previous building. His arms are over a fireplace and 1678 appears on two rainwater heads. The architect is uncertain but the house shows the influence of John Webb.

It was owned by the Gainsborough family between 1700 and 1720 and then the Nevile family until 1891. It was then sold to the Dearden family who owned it until 1963, when it was purchased by the Dennises. Members of both the Nevile and Dearden families served as High Sheriff of Northamptonshire.

During the Second World War the hall housed the remote operations room for RAF Wittering and was then occupied by the 67th Fighter Wing of the United States Eighth Air Force. Their operations room planned and directed many of the Flying Fortress daylight raids on Germany. In 1947, a reward was offered for the "Return of Valuable Property removed from Walcot Hall, during the Air Ministry's Occupation, 1940-46. belonging to J. W. Dearden. Esq., including Old French Carvings, as part of the decorations of reception rooms, etc."

The estate is now a commercial agricultural landholding. The hall is occupied by Darby and Catherine Dennis who sued for compensation over Harrier noise from RAF Wittering.
