= William Chetwynd (MP for Wootton Bassett) =

William Chetwynd (c. 1691 – 24 July 1744), of Beddington, Surrey, was a British lawyer and politician who sat in the House of Commons from 1722 to 1727.

Chetwynd was the second son of John Chetwynd of Ludlow, Shropshire and brother of Walter Chetwynd. He was probably educated at Eton College between 1706 and 1707 and was admitted at Queens' College, Cambridge on 5 March 1708. He was also admitted at Middle Temple in 1707 and called to the bar in 1714.

At the 1722 general election Chetwynd was returned as Member of Parliament for Wootton Bassett, as a government supporter. He did not stand again at the 1727 general election.

Chetwynd married. Lady Elizabeth Carew, widow of Sir Nicholas Carew, 1st Baronet of Beddington, and daughter of Nicholas Hackett of North Crawley, Buckinghamshire on 30 May 1728. He died without issue on 24 July 1744.

Parliament of Great Britain
Preceded by Sir James Long; William Northey	Member of Parliament for Wootton Bassett; 1722–1727; With: Colonel Robert Murray	Succeeded by John St John; John Crosse
