= 1938 Lichfield by-election =

UK Parliamentary by-election

The 1938 Lichfield by-election was held on 5 May 1938. The by-election was held due to the death of the incumbent National Labour MP, James Lovat-Fraser. It was won by the Labour candidate Cecil Poole.

Lichfield by-election, 1938
Party	Candidate	Votes	%	±%
Labour	Cecil Poole	23,586	50.6	+4.4
National Labour	Beresford Craddock	22,760	48.8	−5.0
Majority		826	1.8	N/A
Turnout		46,616	68.5	+4.3
Registered electors				
Labour gain from National Labour		Swing	+4.4	
