= John Levett =

English landowner, investor, and Tory politician

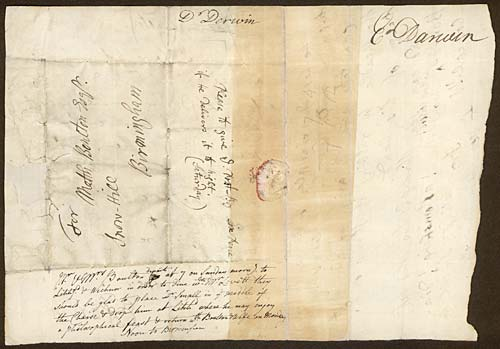
Letter from Erasmus Darwin to Matthew Boulton requesting Boulton bring along fellow member of the Lunar Society William Small on his visit to member John Levett at Wychnor, 1766

John Levett (1721–1799) of Wychnor Park, Staffordshire, was an English landowner and investor, and a Tory politician.

== Biography ==
John Levett was the son of Theophilus Levett (1693–1746), Lichfield attorney and town clerk, and his wife Mary Babington, daughter of Zachary Babington. The Levett family had common roots in Sussex, and the branch had moved to Staffordshire. Levett was educated at Westminster School and Brasenose College, Oxford, and served for a time as a barrister at the Middle Temple and the Inner Temple in London.

Levett was elected Member of Parliament for Lichfield for one term only (1761–1762). After his election to Parliament, Levett is not recorded having spoken or voted while there. Questions were raised about his election and he was unseated after a petition by his opponent Hugo Meynell, who re placed him as MP. After being unseated by petition, he is not known to have stood for Parliament again.

John Levett lived at Wychnor Park from 1765, when he purchased the estate while living in Lichfield. Levett was a sometime member of the Lunar Society, and an early investor in the industrial projects of Birmingham inventor Matthew Boulton. In his will, John Levett assigned part of the revenues he derived from his Soho Manufactory investments to the Prebendary of Curborough, Staffordshire, to which his mother's family the Babington's had ancestral connections.

John Levett never married and is buried in Whittington, Staffordshire, where his Babington ancestors had resided, and where the Levett family continued to hold land.

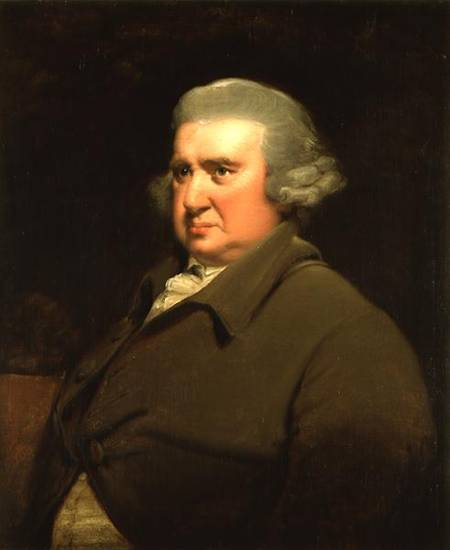
Erasmus Darwin, friend and Lichfield contemporary of John Levett

Parliament of Great Britain
Preceded by Thomas Anson; Henry Vernon	Member of Parliament for Lichfield; 1762–1768; With: Thomas Anson	Succeeded by Thomas Anson; Hugo Meynell
