= Thomas Gilbert (politician) =

British lawyer, soldier, land agent and politician

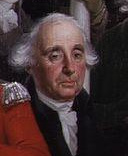
- Born: 1720, 1719
- Died: 18 December 1798 (aged 77–78)
- Occupation: Politician

Thomas Gilbert (c. 1719 – 18 December 1798) was a British lawyer, soldier, land agent and politician who sat in the House of Commons from 1773 to 1794. As one of the earliest advocates of poor relief, he played a major part in the Relief of the Poor Act 1782.

== Early life ==
Gilbert was the son of Thomas Gilbert of Cotton, Staffordshire. He entered Inner Temple in 1740 and was called to the bar in 1744. In 1745 he accepted a position in the regiment created by Lord Gower, the brother-in-law of the Duke of Bridgewater. His first wife was named Miss Phillips whom he married between December 1761 and January 1762. When he married her he bought her a lottery ticket, and she won one of the largest prizes in the country. She died on 22 April 1770 and he married secondly to Mary Crauford daughter of Lieutenant-Colonel George Crauford.

== Political career ==
Gilbert was a Member of Parliament for Newcastle-under-Lyme from 1763 to 1768 and for Lichfield from 1768 to 1795. He held many titles throughout his career in parliament and was a very active member. In 1765 the title Sinecure Place of Comptroller of the Great Wardrobe was given to him, and he kept it until it was eliminated by Burke's bill which reformed the civil list. Gilbert also held the long named office of Paymaster of the Fund for Securing Pensions to the Widows of Officers in the Navy. On 31 May 1784 he received his most important post, the Chairmanship of Committees of Ways and Means. Although he became the chairman of these offices, his passion was helping the poor. He dedicated the majority of his life's work to aiding the less fortunate. In 1765 he brought to the House of Commons a bill that would group parishes for poor-law purposes in greatly populated districts, but it was rejected in the House of Lords by 66 votes to 59. In 1778, while Britain was still at war with the American colonies, he proposed to parliament a tax of twenty-five per cent should be enforced upon all government places and pensions. Many people were against a tax this high and called it absurd but it was still carried in the committee but later turned down.

== Relief of the poor ==
Gilbert then turned his attention to improved highways, but was only able to pass acts for local roads. In 1776 a committee of the House of Commons wrote a report on conditions in factories and workhouses. During the 1780s there was an increase in unemployment which was attributed to an increase in food prices, low wages, and a decrease in available land. These factors led to an increase in the poor population and wealthy landowners turned to Gilbert. In 1782, his name was given to the Relief of the Poor Act 1782

In 1787 Gilbert introduced another bill related to poor relief. It proposed grouping many parishes together, for tax purposes, and imposing an additional charge for the use of turnpikes on Sundays. He also advocated the abolition of ale-houses in the country districts, except for the use of travellers, and their stricter supervision. He also wished to do away with imprisonment for small debts, implemented by a bill passed in 1793.

== Later life and legacy ==
Gilbert died at Cotton in Staffordshire on 18 December 1798. His friend John Holliday printed anonymously a monody on his death, praising his generosity in building and endowing in 1795 the chapel of ease of St. John the Baptist at Lower Cotton. Gilbert and his first wife had two sons, one joined the navy and the other became a clerk to the privy council.

== Gilbert's publications on his schemes of reform ==
- 1775 – Observations upon the Orders and Resolutions of the House of Commons with respect to the Poor and A Bill intended to be offered to Parliament for the better Relief and Employment of the Poor in England
- 1781 – Plan for the better Relief and Employment of the Poor
- 1781 – Plan of Police
- 1782 – Observations on the Bills for amending the Laws relative to Houses of Correction

Parliament of Great Britain
Preceded by John Waldegrave; Sir Lawrence Dundas, Bt	Member of Parliament for Newcastle-under-Lyme; 1763–1768; With: Sir Lawrence Dundas, Bt	Succeeded by Alexander Forrester; John Wrottesley
Preceded by Hugo Meynell; Thomas Anson (1)	Member of Parliament for Lichfield; 1768–1795; With: Thomas Anson to 1770; George Anson 1770–1789; Thomas Anson (2) from 1789	Succeeded by Lord Granville Leveson-Gower; Thomas Anson (2)
