= Hugo Meynell =

English country landowner and politician

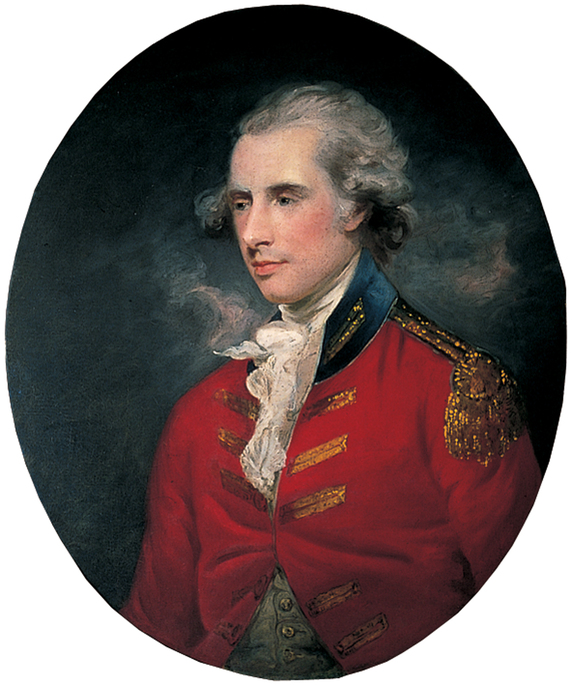
- Meynell by John Hoppner c. 1789
- Born: June 1735
- Died: 14 December 1808 (aged 73)

Hugo Meynell (June 1735 – 14 December 1808) was an English country landowner and politician who sat in the House of Commons between 1762 and 1780. He is generally seen as the father of modern fox hunting, became Master of Fox Hounds for the Quorn Hunt in Leicestershire in 1753 and continued in that role for another forty-seven years (the hunt is so called after Meynell's home, Quorn Hall in Quorndon, North Leicestershire).

== Life ==
He was born the son of Littleton Pointz Meynell in June 1735.

Meynell pioneered an extended chase at high speeds through open grassland. Borrowing the pioneering breeding techniques of his neighbour, the sheep farmer Robert Bakewell, Meynell bred a new form of hound, with greater pace and stamina and a better sense of scent.

In 1762 Meynell was elected as one of the two Members of Parliament for Lichfield, after filing an election petition challenging the election of John Levett of Wychnor, Staffordshire. Meynell took the seat of Levett, a Tory. But apparently the Levett family held no grudge, because successive generations of Levetts were included in the Meynell hunts and became close family friends.

He represented three constituencies as Member of Parliament in the House of Commons between 1762 and 1780 (Lichfield 1762-1768, Lymington 1769-1774 and Stafford 1774-178) and served as High Sheriff of Derbyshire in 1758-1759.

He died in 1808, having married twice. He was succeeded as occupant of Quorn Hall and Master of the Quorn Hunt by his son Hugo, who died two years later after a hunting fall.

Parliament of Great Britain
Preceded by Thomas Anson; John Levett	Member of Parliament for Lichfield; 1762–1768; With: Thomas Anson	Succeeded by Thomas Anson; Thomas Gilbert
Preceded by Sir Harry Burrard; Adam Drummond	Member of Parliament for Lymington; 1769–1774; With: Sir Harry Burrard	Succeeded by Sir Harry Burrard; Edward Morant
Preceded by William Neville Hart; Richard Whitworth	Member of Parliament for Stafford; 1774–1780; With: Richard Whitworth	Succeeded by Edward Monckton; Richard Brinsley Sheridan
