= Daniel Watson =

Daniel Watson (c. 1617 – June 1683) was an English politician who sat in the House of Commons.

Watson was the son of Henry Watson, a tanner of Burton upon Trent and his wife Anne. He became a lawyer. In the English Civil War, he became one of the most prominent Burton parliamentarians. He was a captain of dragoons in the Derbyshire cavalry. He was living in Burton in 1649, when he was appointed a J.P. for the county, and he acquired Nether Hall where he was probably living by at least 1656.

In 1659, Watson was elected Member of Parliament for Lichfield in the Third Protectorate Parliament. He sat in the corporation interest. In 1660, he was elected MP for Lichfield in the Convention Parliament, but was unseated on petition in favour of Thomas Minors on 27 June 1660. He was recorder of Newcastle-under-Lyme from 1660. The house he occupied in Burton in 1666 (presumably Nether Hall) was one of the largest in the town, being assessed for tax on eight hearths.

Parliament of England
| Preceded by Thomas Minors | Member of Parliament for Lichfield; 1659; With: Thomas Minors | Succeeded by Not represented in restored Rump |
