= Roy Wilson (British politician) =

British politician and banker

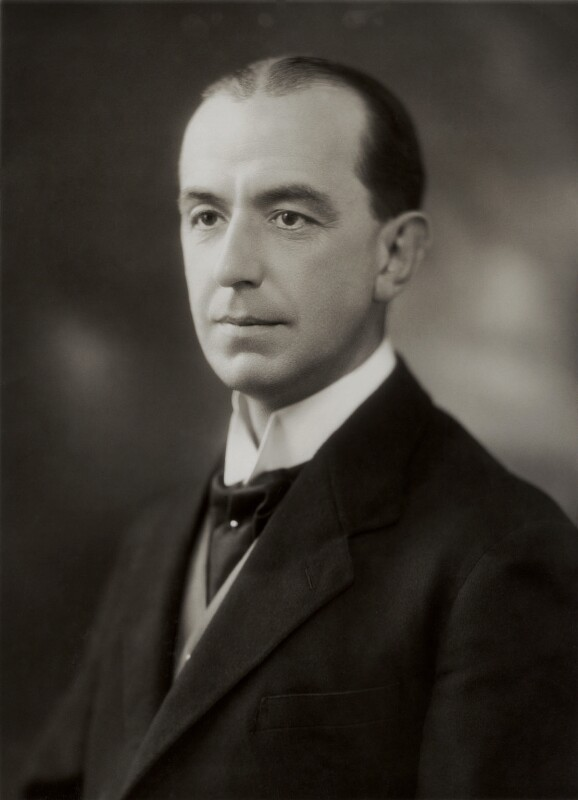
Wilson in 1925

Sir Roderick Roy Wilson (10 August 1876 – 27 August 1942) was a British banker and politician, Conservative MP for Lichfield from 1924 to 1929, and appointed Knight Bachelor in 1929. A portrait is in the National Portrait Gallery.

Wilson played cricket at minor counties level for Cheshire from 1909–1913, making six appearances in the Minor Counties Championship.

Parliament of Great Britain
Preceded by Frank Hodges	Member of Parliament for Lichfield; 1924 - 1929	Succeeded by James Lovat-Fraser
