= William de Lichfield =

English Member of Parliament

William de Lichfield (fl. 1313), was an English Member of Parliament (MP).

De Lichfield was a Member of the Parliament of England for Lichfield in 1313. A William the Taverner was MP in 1320 for Lichfield, it is thought they are the same person.
