= George Whetstone =

16th-century English playwright and writer

George Whetstone (1544? – 1587) was an English dramatist and author.

== Biography ==
Whetstone was the third son of Robert Whetstone (d. 1557), a member of a wealthy family that owned the manor of Walcot at Barnack, near Stamford, Lincolnshire. George appears to have had a small inheritance which he soon spent, and he complains bitterly of the failure of a lawsuit to recover a further inheritance of which he had been unjustly deprived. In 1572 he joined an English regiment on active service in the Low Countries, where he met George Gascoigne and Thomas Churchyard. Gascoigne was his guest at Walcot when he died in 1577, and Whetstone commemorated his friend in a long elegy.

Whetstone's first published work, the Rocke of Regard (1576), consisted of tales in prose and verse adapted from the Italian, and in 1578 he published The right, excellent and famous Historye of Promos and Cassandra, a play in two parts, drawn from the eighty-fifth novel of Giraldi Cinthio's Hecatomithi. To this he wrote an interesting preface addressed to William Fleetwood, recorder of London, to whom he claimed to be related, in which he criticizes contemporary drama.

In 1582 Whetstone published his Heptameron of Civil Discourses, a collection of tales which includes The Rare Historie of Promos and Cassandra. From this prose version William Shakespeare apparently drew the plot of Measure for Measure, though he was probably familiar with the story in its earlier dramatic form. (Shakespeare probably used another Whetstone book for his Much Ado About Nothing). Whetstone accompanied Sir Humphrey Gilbert on his expedition in 1578–1579, and the next year found him in Italy.

The Puritan spirit was now widespread in England, and Whetstone followed its dictates in his prose tract A Mirour for Magestrates (1584), which in a second edition was called A Touchstone for the Time. Rather than abusing the stage as some Puritan writers did, he merely objected to the performance of plays on Sundays.

In 1585 Whetstone returned to the army in the Netherlands, and was present at the Battle of Zutphen (1586). His other works are a collection of military anecdotes entitled The Honourable Reputation of a Souldier (1585); a political tract, the English Myrror (1586), numerous elegies on distinguished persons, and The Censure of a Loyall Subject (1587). No information about Whetstone is available after the publication of this last book, and it was conjectured that he died shortly afterwards. Papers in State Papers Holland show Whetstone was killed in a duel outside Bergen op Zoom in 1587.
