= Pulteney (surname) =

Pulteney is a surname. Notable people with the surname include:

- Daniel Pulteney (c. 1684–1731), English government official and politician
- Harry Pulteney (1686–1767), English soldier and politician
- James Pulteney (1755 - 1811), Scottish soldier und British politician
- Michael Pulteney
- Richard Pulteney (1730–1801), English botanist and physician
- William Pulteney (British Army officer) (1861–1941), British general in World War I
- William Pulteney, 1st Earl of Bath (1684–1764), British politician
