= Boundaries of Parliamentary Constituencies 1885–1972 =

1972 text

- Title page for Boundaries of Parliamentary Constituencies 1885–1972 (1972)
- Author: F. W. S. Craig
- Language: English
- Publication date: 1972
- Publication place: United Kingdom
- ISBN: 0-900178-09-4

Boundaries of Parliamentary Constituencies 1885–1972 (ISBN 0-900178-09-4), F. W. S. Craig, Political Reference Publications, Chichester, Sussex, 1972, provides text and outline map descriptions of United Kingdom Parliament constituencies in Great Britain for the period 1918 to 1983 and in Northern Ireland for the period 1922 to 1983. Also, it includes maps outlining constituencies in Great Britain for the period 1885 to 1918.

It succeeds in covering a period later than 1972 because boundary changes which became effective in 1974 (for the February general election) had been decided in 1971. Only the dates for which the new boundaries would be effective were unknown in 1972. Boundaries described under 1955-1970 remained effective until 1974, and boundaries described under 1971- were effective 1974 to 1983.

The maps divide England into three areas, southern, central and northern, and boundaries between these areas appear to have been very stable throughout the 1885 to 1983 period. Wales is mapped as Wales and Monmouthshire. (Note: See Monmouthshire)

Craig makes clear that a work of this kind is unlikely to be free from error, and error is apparent in the way district of burghs constituencies are shown in the maps. Kilmarnock District of Burghs, for example, is shown as if a single area in Ayrshire: in fact, when abolished in 1918, it consisted of two parliamentary burghs in Ayrshire, two in Renfrewshire and one in Lanarkshire.

Craig attributes the maps to David Bird and Peter Westley, saying they prepared the diagrams and frequently had to work from inadequate maps not always free from error.

Craig points also to inadequacies in boundary commission reports, which may have generated errors in the text and maps, despite efforts to check details. He draws particular attention to Leeds South, which commissioners had listed as having a major boundary change in 1955: in fact the constituency boundaries were unaltered, although the official description of it changed.

== See also ==
- Former United Kingdom Parliament constituencies
- The Parliaments of England (ISBN 0-900178-13-2), Henry Stooks Smith 1844 to 1850, second edition F W S Craig 1973
