= James Lovat-Fraser =

British politician (1868–1938)

James Alexander Lovat-Fraser (16 March 1868 – 18 March 1938) was a British Labour Party and then National Labour politician. He sat in the House of Commons from 1929 to 1938.

== Political career ==
He unsuccessfully contested Llandaff and Barry at the 1922 general election, and Bristol Central at the 1924 general election. He was elected at the 1929 general election as the Member of Parliament (MP) for the Lichfield division of Staffordshire.

When the Labour Party split in 1931 over the budget, Lovat-Fraser was one of the minority of Labour MPs who supported the Prime Minister Ramsay MacDonald in forming a National Government with Conservative Party support. He was re-elected as a National Labour candidate in 1931 and in 1935 and held the seat until his death in March 1938, aged 70.

Parliament of Great Britain
Preceded by Roderick Roy Wilson	Member of Parliament for Lichfield; 1929 – 1938	Succeeded by Cecil Charles Poole
