= Thomas Minors =

Thomas Minors (16 October 1609 – September 1677) was an English merchant and politician who sat in the House of Commons at various times between 1654 and 1660.

Minors was the only son of Robert Minors of Uttoxeter and his wife Gertrude Hunt, daughter of Edmund Hunt of Marchington. He became a draper in Lichfield and was sheriff of Lichfield from 1642 to 1643. He did not take part in the Civil War, while the city was held by the Royalists, but he was a Presbyterian and probably supported the parliamentarian cause. He was commissioner for assessment from 1647 to 1652 and was bailiff from 1648 to 1649. In 1653 he was commissioner for poor prisoners and became J.P. for Staffordshire until July 1660.

In 1654, Minors was elected Member of Parliament for Lichfield for the First Protectorate Parliament. He was also commissioner for scandalous ministers. In 1656 he was re-elected MP for Lichfield in the Second Protectorate Parliament. He was commissioner for assessment in 1657 and bailiff again from 1657 to 1658. He was commissioner for assessment from Jan. 1660 to 1661 and commissioner for militia in March 1660. In 1660 he was initially defeated as MP for Lichfield but won the seat again on petition in June 1660. In 1664 he was commissioner for assessment again and held the role until his death. In 1669 he appeared before the Privy Council for keeping unlawful meetings in his house. His house was later licensed for Presbyterian worship under the Declaration of Indulgence.

In 1670 Thomas Minors founded a school for 30 poor boys to be taught to read English (Minors' school) providing a house in Bore Street, Lichfield for the purpose. He continued to maintain this school until his death in 1677. In his will he left the property with land as an endowment "... a school house, wherein may be taught thirty poor boys to spell and read English until they could well read chapters in the bible, without any reward from parents or friends".

He died at the age of 67 and was buried in St Mary's church, Lichfield on 30 September 1677.

Minors married firstly Sarah Burnes daughter of John Burnes, mercer of Lichfield and had a son. She died in 1667 and he married secondly Dorothy Jesson, who was the sister of William Jesson of Lichfield.

Parliament of England
Preceded by Not represented in Barebones Parliament	Member of Parliament for Lichfield; 1654–1659; With: Daniel Watson 1659	Succeeded by Not represented in Restored Rump
