= The Parliaments of England =

Compendium of U.K. election results from 1715 to 1847

The Parliaments of England (ISBN 0-900178-13-2) is a compendium of election results for all House of Commons constituencies of the Parliament of Great Britain and the Parliament of the United Kingdom from 1715 to 1847, compiled by Henry Stooks Smith.

The compendium was first published in three volumes by Simpkin, Marshall and Company, London, 1844 to 1850. A second edition, edited by F. W. S. Craig, was published in one volume by Political Reference Publications, 18 Lincoln Green, Chichester, Sussex, in 1973.

As compiled by Smith, The Parliaments of England appears to be the first reference work of its kind and, according to Craig, in his introduction to the second edition, "a random check of the book reveals relatively few errors and omissions considering the difficulty in collecting results during a period when no official records, other than the actual Writs, were preserved".

Craig describes the 1973 edition as a facsimile, "reproduced from the best available copy". This 'facsimile', however, is in one volume instead of three, with consecutive page numbering. Also, "a new and more detailed index to constituencies" is included, and lists showing the duration of each parliament and the names of Prime Ministers have been "revised and corrected".

== See also ==
- Boundaries of Parliamentary Constituencies 1885-1972 (ISBN 0-900178-09-4), F. W. S. Craig 1972
