= John Goodman (MP) =

English politician

John Goodman (c. 1540–1604), of Lincoln's Inn, London, was an English member of Parliament.

He was a member (MP) of the parliament of England for Lichfield in 1586.
