= Stephen Blund =

English politician

Stephen le Blount (fl. 1320s), was an English Member of the Parliament of England for Lichfield from 1326–1327.

He was probably the same person as Stephen Blund, a bishop's steward in the 1320s.
