= Cecil Poole (politician) =

Cecil Charles Poole (1902 – 2 February 1956) was a Labour Party politician in the United Kingdom, and a Member of Parliament (MP) from 1938 to 1955.

At the 1935 General Election, he contested Shrewsbury constituency, coming second. He was first elected at a by-election in 1938 for the Lichfield constituency in Staffordshire, following the death of the National Labour MP James Lovat-Fraser. Poole held the seat at the 1945 general election, and when the Lichfield constituency was abolished for the 1950 general election, he was elected for the new Birmingham Perry Barr seat.

In 1951, Poole was parliamentary private secretary to President of the Board of Trade (PBT), Harold Wilson. When Wilson resigned from the government in April 1951 in protest at the introduction of National Health Service charges to meet the financial demands imposed by the Korean War, Poole was offered the same role with the new PBT, Hartley Shawcross, but declined to serve, saying "I declined because I support the views of the three ministers who resigned in opposition to the dentures and spectacles charges and the general rearmament question".

He retired from the House of Commons at the 1955 general election, and died the following year, aged 53.

Parliament of the United Kingdom
Preceded by James Lovat-Fraser	Member of Parliament for Lichfield; 1938–1950	Constituency abolished
New constituency	Member of Parliament for Birmingham Perry Barr; 1950–1955	Succeeded by Charles Howell
