= Michael Pulteney =

Michael Pulteney (died 1567), of Misterton, Leicestershire, was an English Member of Parliament (MP).

He was a Member of the Parliament of England for Lichfield in 1563.
