= Anthony Dyott =

English politician

Anthony Dyott (c. 1560 – 1622) was an English lawyer and politician who sat in the House of Commons between 1601 and 1614.

Dyott was the eldest son of John Dyott of Freeford, bailiff of Lichfield, and his first wife Margaret Hill, daughter of Robert Hill of Lichfield. He was admitted at Inner Temple in 1576 and was called to the bar in 1587. In 1580, he succeeded to the Freeford estate on the death of his father. He became recorder of Tamworth on 24 July 1598. He was bencher of the Inner Temple in June 1599.

In 1601, Dyott was elected Member of Parliament for Lichfield. One of his contributions in that parliament was opposing a clause in the bill for better observing of the sabbath day which imposed fines on husbands whose wives failed to attend church service on Sunday. He argued "What if wives were wilful and would not go? Every man can tame a shrew but he that hath her". He was Lent reader at Inner Temple in 1602. In 1604 he was re-elected MP for Lichfield. He became J.P. for Staffordshire in 1609. He was treasurer of his Inn from 1611 to 1612. In 1614 he was elected MP for Lichfield again in a by-election.

Dyott died at the age of about 61 and was buried in St Dunstan's chapel on 27 September 1622.

Dyott married Catherine Harcourt, daughter of John Harcourt of Ronton Abbey in 1589. He at least one son Richard who was also MP for Lichfield.

Parliament of England
Preceded by Sir John Egerton; William Wingfield	Member of Parliament for Lichfield; 1614; With: William Wingfield	Succeeded by William Wingfield; Richard Weston
Preceded by Joseph Oldsworth; William Fowkes	Member of Parliament for Lichfield; 1601–1611; With: Robert Browne 1601; Thomas Crewe 1604–1611	Succeeded by William Wingfield; Sir John Egerton
Preceded by William Wingfield; Sir John Egerton	Member of Parliament for Lichfield; 1601; With: William Wingfield	Succeeded by William Wingfield; Richard Weston
