= F. W. S. Craig =

Scottish election expert (1929–1989)

Frederick Walter Scott Craig (10 December 1929 – 23 March 1989) was a Scottish psephologist and compiler of the standard reference books covering United Kingdom Parliamentary election results. He originally worked in public relations, compiling election results in his spare time which were published by the Scottish Unionist Party. In the late 1960s he launched his own business as a publisher of reference books, and also compiled various other statistics concerning British politics.

Craig also had a political career of his own, initially as an election agent and then as a candidate. Efforts to get elected in his native Glasgow being unsuccessful, after he moved to Chichester in 1970 he was first elected to the District Council and later to West Sussex County Council. However he fell out with a faction in the local Conservative Party and launched a rebel group which led to his expulsion. Late in his life he suffered severe depression and he committed suicide at the age of 59.

== Early life ==
Craig was a native of Glasgow. He became interested in election statistics while still at school. He was active in the Scottish Unionist Party Association, and in 1954 began to contribute the 'Scottish Parliamentary Election Manual' of election results to the Yearbook for Scotland, which the party published. Craig was unhappy with existing sources for election statistics and undertook research himself to correct the vote figures and discover the source of independent candidates, and his election manual became highly respected.

== Political activity ==
As a paid agent for the Unionist Party, Craig was the election agent for James Hutchison in Glasgow Scotstoun in the 1955 general election and for the Unionist parliamentary candidate in Rutherglen in 1964. He twice fought for election to the Glasgow City Corporation in the mid-1960s. His first attempt was in May 1966 when he came forward as an Independent Conservative candidate against the 'Progressive Party', a local alliance between Conservatives and Liberals which controlled the council, in Kelvinside ward. Craig offered to withdraw if the Progressive councillor would repudiate that party's policy on council house rents, and to sit as a Conservative if the party split up; the offer was rejected.

In September 1967 Craig was selected as official Conservative candidate for Gorbals ward in a byelection; he was one of seven candidates and attempted to stand out by distributing on the eve of poll 5,000 'wage packets' containing an appeal to vote for him. However Craig came third in the poll.

== Reference books ==
His research into elections continued and widened from Scotland to the whole of the United Kingdom, and he compiled a card index to all elections from 1918 onwards. In 1966 he had completed a manuscript of a reference book on statistics about elections since 1918, which was intended to be published in two volumes of 700 pages each to be part-funded by the Institute of Electoral Research; the calling of a general election annoyed him because he would have to add the statistics from it to the book. Craig took a decisive step in 1968 when he was paid off from his public relations job and set up Political Reference Publications, to publish his work. The first book to be published was British Parliamentary Election Statistics 1918–1968 which summarised the results of every general election as well as giving a wealth of other information. Critical reception was very positive and Craig always considered it his favourite book. It has continued to be updated, under the title British Electoral Facts.

His series of British Parliamentary Election Results began to appear the next year with the volume for 1918–1949. The series has been completed to run from the Reform Act 1832 to date. Craig also started the Political Companion, a quarterly update, which ran from 1969 to 1983. His work was a family affair with his wife Phyllis helping with the production and administration, and his daughters undertaking the proofreading. Craig pioneered the use of technology and put the source data onto computer readable tape; the distinctive clear layout of his books was a result of his use of early computer typesetting.

== Expanding company ==
In 1970 he moved from Anniesland Cross in Glasgow to Chichester in West Sussex and established another company, Parliamentary Research Services, which eventually took over all his activities. His public relations background led to new lines of business including compilation of activities of members of parliament from votes in the House of Commons. He was part of the BBC team, albeit behind the camera, on their programme covering the 1970 general election; in 1972 he was asked to help by both the BBC and ITV, and decided to transfer to commercial television. In 1973 he was elected to Chichester District Council, but with the pressure of work caused by the two elections of 1974 he resigned his seat. When the candidate selected to replace him dropped out, Craig found that his busy period was over and was himself nominated to fight the by-election caused by his own resignation.

Craig was a leading member of Chichester Concern, a group set up to oppose a pedestrianisation precinct in the centre of the city. He arranged for John Tyme, a lecturer in Environmental Studies at Sheffield Polytechnic who had made a name opposing motorway schemes, to come to a public inquiry and oppose it. Tyme was unable to persuade the inquiry to adjourn and consider alternatives, and had to return home.

=== Opinions ===
In 1975 Craig criticised the extension of postal votes to people on holiday at the time of elections, arguing that there were "very real dangers in any electoral system which permits extensive voting by post". He thought it absurd to increase postal voting facilities which might lead to widespread abuse because there were many ways of committing electoral fraud.

Craig used the prefaces and forewords of his books to express opinions on the electoral system, arguing in 1977 that the increasing numbers of fringe and frivolous candidates in Parliamentary elections made it necessary to raise the level of the deposit required for a nomination to be valid. He also criticised the ability of people with holiday homes to register to vote in two constituencies, on the grounds that they could choose to vote in the most marginal. Craig pointed out that while it was illegal for dual registered voters to vote twice, the penalties were minimal and the offence difficult to detect. In Chronology of British Parliamentary By-elections, Craig decried the "confusing and often misleading display of computer graphics" used on television election programmes, and also noted the decline in newspaper coverage of by-election campaigns by the broadsheet newspapers.

When the Home Affairs Select Committee conducted an inquiry into the Representation of the People Acts, Craig (through his company) submitted a memorandum calling for an increased deposit, prohibition of multiple registration, and prevention of candidates changing their names to ones similar to those of other candidates. He also pressed for Returning Officers to be compelled to send the official result of every Parliamentary election to the Clerk of the Crown.

== Conservative split ==
At the West Sussex County Council election in 1981, Craig was elected as a Conservative councillor in Chichester West division, while his wife Phyllis won Chichester South division. He had been the Chairman of the Chichester City branch of Chichester Conservative Association for many years, but at a stormy meeting on 1 March 1982 he was voted out of office. When he spoke in support of his re-election, Craig had noted the presence of many unfamiliar faces and declared "I will oppose wets and Left Wing infiltrators who would like to destroy this great party from within". In November 1981 the Association had adopted a new policy under which it refused to pay election expenses for sitting councillors, although new candidates would be funded. Craig and the other sitting councillors considered this amounted to deselection and formed the 'Association of Conservative Councillors' which would raise funds for their election expenses.

The Association of Conservative Councillors chose Craig as its election agent and declared its intention to nominate candidates against those of the Conservative Association. The resignation of a Liberal councillor led to a by-election for Chichester District Council in Chichester West ward in June 1982; Phyllis Craig was nominated in opposition to the official Conservative. The Liberal candidate held the seat with a majority of 149, with Phyllis Craig receiving 250 votes. It was widely perceived that her intervention had led to the Liberals winning a seat which otherwise would have been Conservative. Craig and his wife had their annual subscriptions returned by the Conservative Association in January 1983, which he denounced as "a back-door method of expulsion" and "a very nasty way of getting rid of someone."

Craig and his wife stood as Independent Conservative candidates for Chichester District Council in the 1983 council elections, but were not successful. He did not stand for re-election to the County Council in 1985 when his term ended. He later became a member of Chichester and Bognor Regis Samaritans.

== Suicide ==
Fred and Phyllis Craig separated in January 1988, placing the future of his business in jeopardy. The news was considered so important that the House of Commons Library issued a note to alert journalists to it. Craig sold his publishing business to Dartmouth Publishing, which later became part of Ashgate Publishing; he retained editorial control. He could not come to terms with living on his own, and attempted suicide in 1988 by taking an overdose of pills; the dedication of "Britain Votes 4" written in May 1988 records his thanks to family and friends as well as medical staff. However over the Easter holiday in 1989 he was found dead in his car having run a pipe from the exhaust. The cause of death was certified as carbon monoxide poisoning and the coroner returned a verdict of suicide as "from the circumstances and from the notes which have been left, I have no doubt he intended the result of what he did".

After his death, his papers were given to Professors Colin Rallings and Michael Thrasher of the University of Plymouth.

== Bibliography ==
- Craig, F. W. S. (1968). British parliamentary election statistics, 1918–1968 (1st ed.). Glasgow: Political Reference Publications. ISBN 0-900178-00-0.
  - Craig, F. W. S. (1971). British parliamentary election statistics, 1918–1970 (2nd ed.). Chichester: Political Reference Publications. ISBN 0-900178-04-3.
  - Craig, F. W. S. (1976). British electoral facts, 1885–1975 (3rd ed.). London: Macmillan. ISBN 0-333-19734-8.
  - Craig, F. W. S. (1981). British electoral facts, 1832–1980 (4th ed.). Chichester: Parliamentary Research Services. ISBN 0-900178-20-5.
  - Craig, F. W. S. (1989). British electoral facts, 1832–1987 (5th ed.). Aldershot: Dartmouth. ISBN 0-900178-30-2.
  - Subsequent editions edited by Colin Rallings and Michael Thrasher
- Craig, F. W. S. (1969). British parliamentary election results 1918–1949 (1st ed.). Glasgow: Political Reference Publications. ISBN 9780900178016.
  - Craig, F. W. S. British parliamentary election results 1918–1949 (2nd ed.).
  - Craig, F. W. S. (1983). British parliamentary election results 1918–1949 (3rd ed.). Chichester: Parliamentary Research Services. ISBN 0-900178-06-X.
- Craig, F. W. S. (1969–1983). The Political Companion (Serial). Glasgow (nos. 1–3); Chichester (nos. 4–33): Political Reference Publications (nos. 1–17); Parliamentary Research Services (nos. 18–33).
- Craig, F. W. S. (1971). Greater London Votes: 1. The Greater London Council 1964–1970. Chichester: Political Reference Publications. ISBN 0-900178-05-1. - despite the number in the title, no further volumes in this series were published
- Craig, F. W. S. (1971). British General Election Manifestos, 1918–1966 (1st ed.). Chichester: Political Reference Publications. ISBN 0-900178-03-5.
  - Craig, F. W. S. (1975). British General Election Manifestos, 1900–1974 (2nd ed.). London: Macmillan. ISBN 0-333-17154-3.
  - Craig, F. W. S. (1990). British General Election Manifestos, 1959–1987 (3rd ed.). Aldershot: Dartmouth. ISBN 0-900178-34-5.
- Craig, F. W. S. (1971). British parliamentary election results 1950–1970 (1st ed.). Chichester: Political Reference Publications. ISBN 9780900178023.
  - Craig, F. W. S. (1983). British parliamentary election results 1950–1973 (2nd ed.). Chichester: Parliamentary Research Services. ISBN 0-900178-07-8.
- Craig, F. W. S. (1972). Boundaries of Parliamentary Constituencies 1885-1972. Chichester: Political Reference Publications. ISBN 0-900178-09-4.
- Craig, F. W. S., ed. (1973). The Parliaments of England 1844 to 1850 (2nd ed.). Chichester: Political Reference Publications. ISBN 0-900178-13-2. – edited reprint of an election handbook which first appeared in three volumes, 1844–50
- Craig, F. W. S. (1974). British parliamentary election results 1885–1918 (1st ed.). London: Macmillan.
  - Craig, F. W. S. (1989). British parliamentary election results 1885–1918 (2nd ed.). Aldershot.
- Craig, F. W. S. (1974). Minor parties at British parliamentary elections 1885–1974. London: Macmillan. ISBN 0-333-17152-7.
- Craig, F. W. S. (1975). The Most Gracious Speeches to Parliament, 1900–74: Statements of Government Policy and Achievement (1st ed.). London: Macmillan. ISBN 0-333-18820-9.
- Craig, F. W. S. (1977). British parliamentary election results 1832–1885 (1st ed.). London: Macmillan.
  - Craig, F. W. S. (1989). British parliamentary election results 1832–1885 (2nd ed.). Aldershot: Parliamentary Research Services. ISBN 0-900178-26-4.
- Craig, F. W. S. (1977). Britain Votes. Chichester: Parliamentary Research Services. - setting out data from the two general elections of 1974 (including the one by-election held between the two), which was subsequently included in Craig's volume British Parliamentary Elections, 1974–1983 (1984)
- Craig, F. W. S. (1980). Britain Votes 2. Chichester: Parliamentary Research Services. ISBN 0-900178-18-3. - setting out data from by-elections held between the two general elections of October 1974 and 1979, which was subsequently included in Craig's volume British Parliamentary Elections, 1974–1983 (1984)
- Craig, F. W. S. (1980). Europe Votes: European Parliamentary election results, 1979. with Thomas T. Mackie. Chichester: Parliamentary Research Services. ISBN 0-900178-19-1.
- Craig, F. W. S. (1982). Conservative and Labour party conference decisions, 1945–81. Dartmouth.
- Craig, F. W. S. (1983). Britain Votes 3. Chichester: Parliamentary Research Services. - setting out data from the general election of 1983, which was subsequently included in Michael Thrasher and Colin Rallings's volume British parliamentary election results, 1983–1997 (Ashgate, 1999)
- Craig, F. W. S. (1984). British parliamentary election results, 1974–1983. Chichester: Parliamentary Research Services. ISBN 0-900178-23-X.
- Craig, F. W. S. (1984). City and Royal Burgh of Glasgow municipal election results 1948–73. Chichester: Parliamentary Research Services. ISBN 0-900178-29-9.
- Craig, F. W. S. (1985). Europe Votes 2: European Parliamentary election results, 1979–1984. with Thomas T. Mackie. Chichester: Parliamentary Research Services. ISBN 0-900178-24-8.
- Craig, F. W. S. (1987). Chronology of British by-elections, 1832–1987. Chichester: Parliamentary Research Services. ISBN 0-900178-31-0.
- Craig, F. W. S. (1988). Britain Votes 4. Chichester: Parliamentary Research Services / Gower. ISBN 0-900178-25-6. - setting out data on by-elections on by-elections held between the two general elections of 1983 and 1987, which was subsequently included in Michael Thrasher and Colin Rallings's volume British parliamentary election results, 1983–1997 (Ashgate, 1999)

As can be seen from the above list, Craig's chronological reference works on British elections, long considered definitive in their accuracy, are spread over five volumes, covering the years 1832–85, 1885–1918, 1918–49, 1950–73 and 1974–83.
