= William Timperley (politician) =

William Timperley (c. 1525 – c. 1606), of Lincoln's Inn, London and Monewden, Suffolk, was an English Member of Parliament (MP).

He was a Member of the Parliament of England for Lichfield in 1571.
