= Sir Rowland Hill, 1st Baronet =

English Member of Parliament

Sir Rowland Hill, 1st Baronet (baptised 28 September 1705 – 7 August 1783), of Hawkstone, Shropshire, was an English Member of Parliament.

He was a Member (MP) of the Parliament of Great Britain for Lichfield 1734–1741.
