= Sir Thomas Gresley, 5th Baronet =

Sir Thomas Gresley, 5th Baronet (1722-1753), of Drakelow, Derbyshire, was an English Member of Parliament.

He was a Member (MP) of the Parliament of England for Lichfield 30 November - 23 December 1753. He was of the Gresley baronets.
