= Edward Fitzgerald (Great Grimsby and Lichfield MP) =

English politician (1529–1590)

Edward Fitzgerald, Fitzgarrett, Garrett or Tarrat (1529–1590), of Stanwell, Middlesex, was an English Member of Parliament (MP).

He was a Member of the Parliament of England for Great Grimsby in 1563 and for Lichfield in 1571 and 1572.
