= Richard Broughton (MP) =

Member of the Parliament of England

Richard Broughton (1542–1604), of Lower Broughton and Owlbury, Bishop's Castle, Shropshire, was an English politician and judge.

He was born in 1542, son of Robert Broughton and his Welsh wife Jane, daughter of Reignold ap Griffith Vycha.

He was a Member (MP) of the Parliament of England for Stafford 1572, and for Lichfield 1586, 1589 and 1593.

By profession a lawyer who was called to the bar at the Inner Temple in 1568, he became active in the affairs of Staffordshire as well as with Shropshire and Wales. He was appointed Steward of the City of Lichfield by 1583; Deputy Justice of Chester by 1588; Recorder of Tamworth by 1584-98; Second Justice of North Wales from 1594 until removed ostensibly on grounds of age and health in 1602; Vice-Justice of Chester 1599-1600; Justice of the Peace (J.P) for counties of Anglesey, Caernarvonshire, Montgomeryshire and Merionethshire from 1594 and Shropshire from 1596. He was member of the Council in the Marches of Wales from c.1595 until being removed also from that post in 1602.

Broughton was a legal adviser to the family of Walter Devereux, 1st Earl of Essex, who were landowners in Staffordshire and influential patrons in his career, and a trustee during the minority of the latter's son the 2nd Earl, later the favourite of Elizabeth I. His removal from his last judicial post and membership of the Welsh Marches Council followed the latter Earl's rebellion and execution. Later in 1602 he sought a 'princely pension' from the secretary of state Robert Cecil.

He married on 30 June 1577, Anne daughter of Richard Bagot of Blithfield, Staffordshire, by whom he had a son who succeeded to his estates, and a daughter. Broughton died in 1604.
