= Robert Browne (died 1623) =

English politician

Robert Browne (died 1623), of Walcot Hall, Northamptonshire, was an English politician.

He shared his father's name, who died in 1572. His mother was Margaret, the daughter of Philip Bernard of Akenham, Suffolk. He married twice. First, to Anne, the daughter of Roger Capstock. Then, to Elizabeth, daughter of John Doyley of Chislehampton, Oxon.

He was a member (MP) of the parliament of England for Lichfield in 1601.
