= Samuel Hill (1691–1758) =

English Member of Parliament

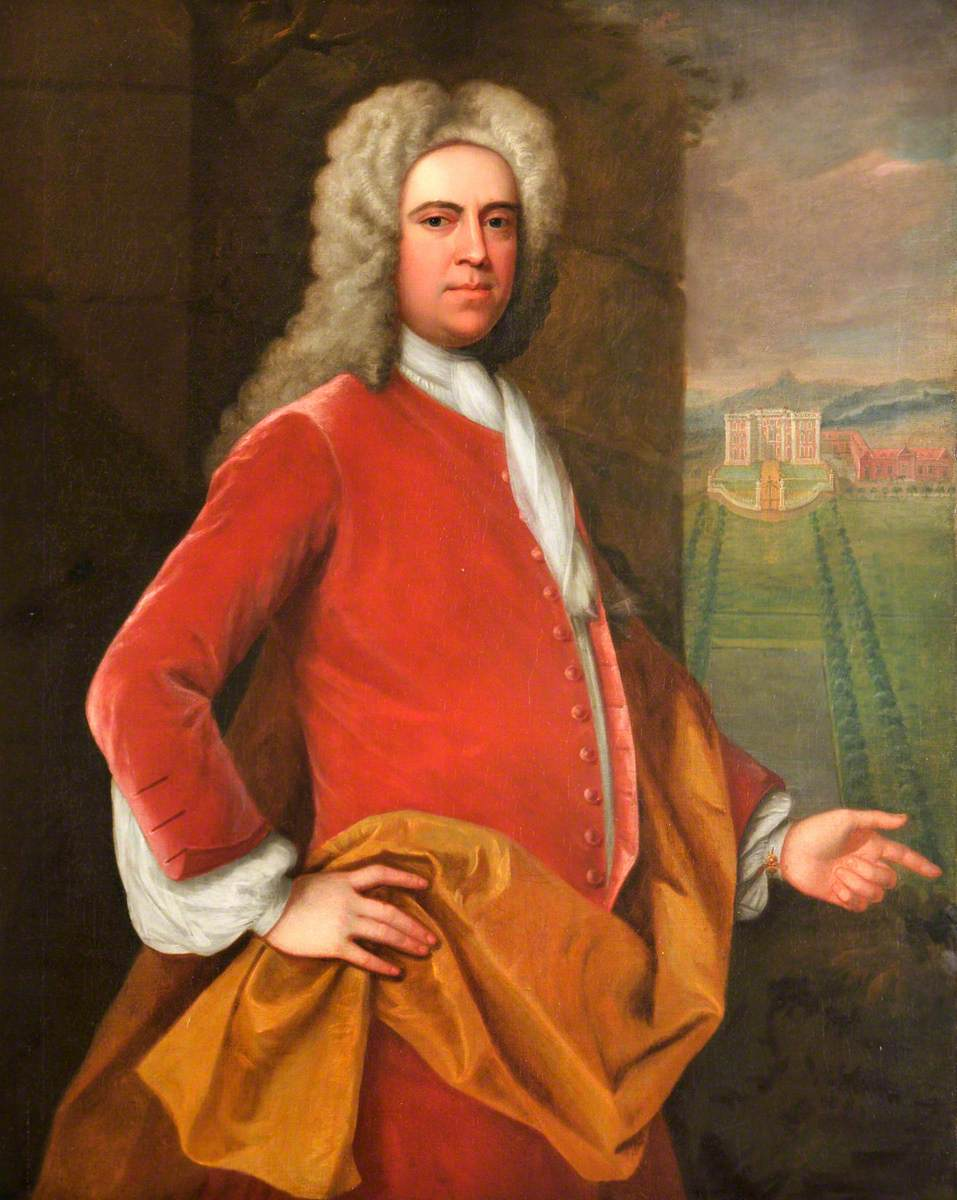
Image of Samuel Hill

Samuel Hill (?1691-1758), of Shenstone Park, near Lichfield, Staffordshire, was an English Member of Parliament.

He was a Member (MP) of the Parliament of Great Britain for Lichfield 1715–1722.
