= William Wingfield (died 1639) =

William Wingfield (died 1639), of Chartley, Staffordshire and Essex House, The Strand, Westminster, was an English Member of Parliament (MP).

Wingfield was a Member of the Parliament of England for Lichfield in 1614, 1621, 1624, 1625, 1626 and 1628.
