= Sir Michael Biddulph, 2nd Baronet =

Sir Michael Biddulph, 2nd Baronet (c. 1652 – 20 April 1718), of Elmshurst, Staffordshire and Westcombe, Kent, was an English Whig politician who sat in the English and British House of Commons between 1679 and 1710.

== Early life ==
Biddulph was the son of Sir Theophilus Biddulph, 1st Baronet and Susanna Highlord. He was educated at St Paul's School and Christ's College, Cambridge.

He succeeded to his father's baronetcy in April 1683.

== Career ==
Biddulph stood for Parliament at Lichfield at a by-election of 1678, but was defeated in a hard-fought and costly contest. He was returned as Member of Parliament (MP) for Lichfield at the two general elections of 1679 and at the 1681 English general election. He did not stand at the 1685 English general election, but gave his interest to Thomas Orme. He regained his seat at the 1689 English general election but lost it again at the 1690 English general election. He was returned again as MP for Lichfield at the 1695 English general election and signed the Association in February 1696. He voted to fix the price of guineas at 22 shilling in March 1696 and for the attainder of Sir John Fenwick on 25 November 1696. He built and lived at Elmhurst Hall just north of Lichfield during his time as MP for the city.

Biddulph was returned again in a contest at the 1698 English general election but was defeated at the first general election of 1701. He was returned again at the second general election of 1701.

Biddulph had stood surety for his wife's cousin Morgan Whitley, who had been appointed receiver general of Cheshire and North Wales. In January 1702, Whitley was found to be owing the Crown a total debt of £43,000, and by February 1702 Biddulph was facing severe financial penalties on account of Whitley's failures. When he was returned at the 1702 English general election, he was in prison at Stafford, presumably on account of his debts. He was able to obtain release from prison, but had to keep a low profile to avoid being detained again. He voted with the Whigs in Parliament in February 1703 but was in prison again by September, after which he was released again. His estates, in which he only held a life interest, were taken over by the Crown, but his time in prison had been detrimental to his health. Eventually an act of Parliament was passed to allow the Lord Treasurer to compound with him for the debt and the marriage of Biddulph's son provided sufficient funds to cover it. He did not stand at the 1705 English general election, but was returned again as a Whig at the 1708 British general election. He was an inactive Member and did not stand in 1710.

== Personal life ==
On 31 December 1673, he married Henrietta Maria Witley, daughter of Col. Richard Witley, in Westminster Abbey in London. By his first wife, he had two daughters and a son:

- Sir Theophilus Biddulph, 3rd Baronet (1683–1743).

On 7 March 1697 or 1698 Biddulph married as his second wife Elizabeth D'Oyly, daughter of William D'Oyly. By his second wife, he had three daughters.

Biddulph died on 20 April 1718, and was buried in Greenwich in Kent on 1 May 1718. He was succeeded in the baronetcy by his son Theophilus Biddulph.

Parliament of England
Preceded by Sir Theophilus Biddulph, Bt; Sir Henry Lyttelton, Bt	Member of Parliament for Lichfield; 1679–1685; With: Sir Henry Lyttelton, Bt 1679; Daniel Finch	Succeeded by Thomas Orme; Richard Leveson
Preceded by Thomas Orme; Richard Leveson	Member of Parliament for Lichfield; 1689–1690; With: Robert Burdett	Succeeded by Robert Burdett; Richard Dyott
Preceded by Robert Burdett; Richard Dyott	Member of Parliament for Lichfield; 1695 – January 1701; With: Robert Burdett 1695–1698; Richard Dyott 1698–1701	Succeeded by William Walmisley; Richard Dyott
Preceded by William Walmisley; Richard Dyott	Member of Parliament for Lichfield; November 1701 – 1705; With: Richard Dyott	Succeeded by Sir Henry Gough; Richard Dyott
Parliament of Great Britain
Preceded by Sir Henry Gough; Richard Dyott	Member of Parliament for Lichfield; 1708–1710; With: John Cotes	Succeeded by John Cotes; Richard Dyott
Baronetage of England
Preceded by Theophilus Biddulph	Baronet (of Westcombe); 1683–1718	Succeeded by Theophilus Biddulph
