= Sir Robert Burdett, 3rd Baronet =

English baronet and Tory politician (1640–1716)

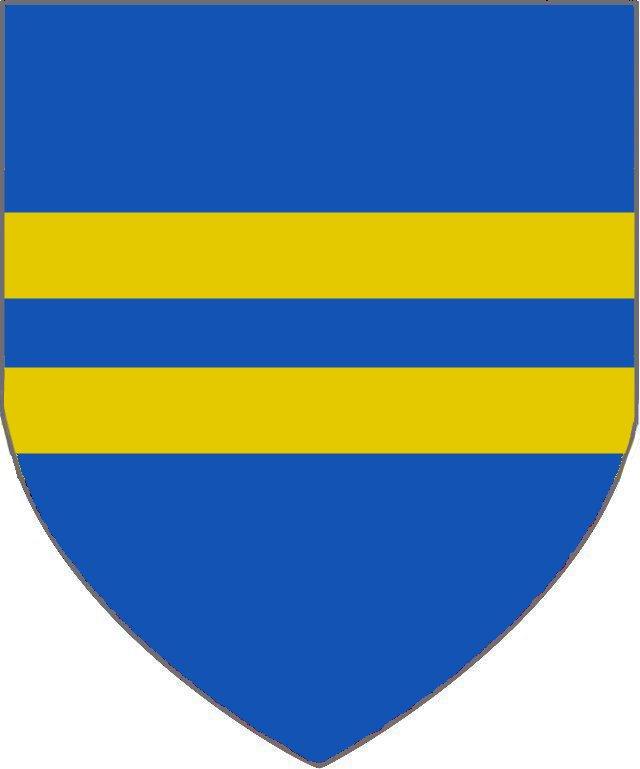
Arms of Burdett of Bramcote: Azure, two bars or (arms of their ancestor Sir William Burdet (died pre-1309) of Lowesby in Leicestershire)

Sir Robert Burdett, 3rd Baronet DL (11 January 1640 – 18 January 1716) was an English baronet and Tory politician.

== Background and education ==
Burdett was the offspring of a Warwickshire family, who had settled also in Derbyshire. He was oldest son of Sir Francis Burdett, 2nd Baronet and his wife Elizabeth, daughter of Sir John Walter, some time a Lord Chief Baron of the Exchequer. In 1659, he went to Queen's College, Oxford and then was called to the bar by Gray's Inn in 1662. On the death of his father in 1696, he succeeded to the baronetcy.

== Career ==
Burdett entered the English House of Commons in 1679, sitting for Warwickshire in the next both years. In 1689 he was elected for Lichfield, which he represented until his retirement in 1698. In Parliament he spoke unsuccessfully against the attainder of Sir John Fenwick, 3rd Baronet, who was beheaded shortly afterwards. He was nominated a Deputy Lieutenant in 1704, serving for Warwickshire.

== Family ==
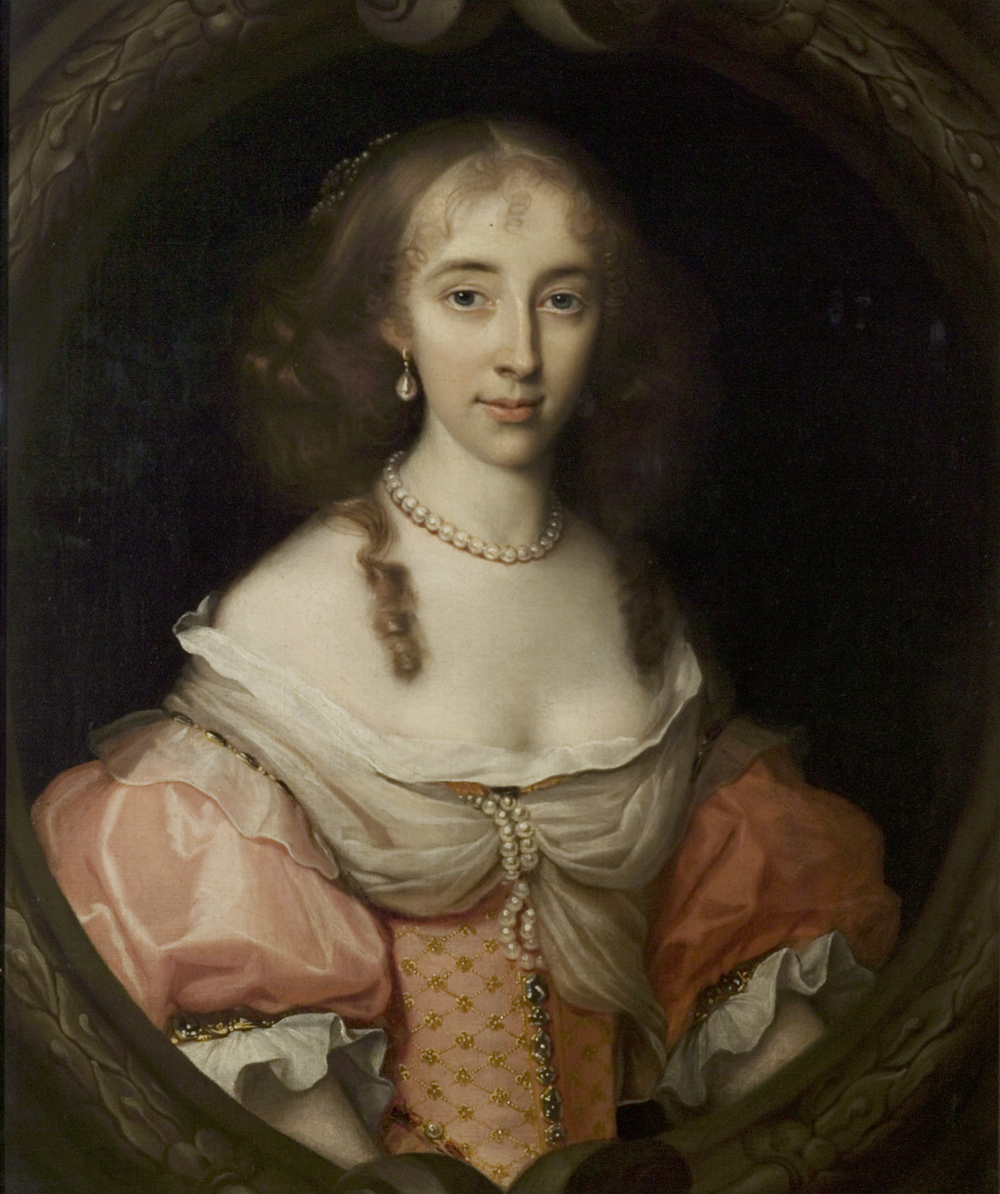
Portrait of Magdalen Aston by John Michael Wright

Burdett married firstly Mary, only daughter of Gervase Pigot in 1666 and had by her a son and a daughter. After her death two years later, he married again Magdalen Aston, daughter of Sir Thomas Aston, 1st Baronet and granddaughter of Sir Henry Willoughby, 1st Baronet, in 1676. By her Burdett had another four sons and as many daughters. Magdalen died in 1694. His third wife was Mary, daughter of Thomas Brome. Burdett died in January 1716, aged 76; he was survived by his last wife. Robert, his only surviving son had predeceased him for two week and so the title was claimed by the former baronet's younger brother Walter. Elizabeth, Robert's wife, however was pregnant at the time of his death and when her son Robert, named after his father, was born in May 1716, he succeeded to the baronetcy.

== Notes ==
Parliament of England
Preceded by Sir Robert Holte; Sir Henry Puckering	Member of Parliament for Warwickshire; 1679–1681; With: Sir Edward Boughton	Succeeded by Sir Richard Newdigate; Thomas Mariet
Preceded by Thomas Orme; Richard Leveson	Member of Parliament for Lichfield; 1689–1698; With: Sir Michael Biddulph 1689–1690; Richard Dyott 1690–1695; Sir Michael Biddulph 1695–1698	Succeeded by Sir Michael Biddulph; Richard Dyott
Baronetage of England
Preceded by Francis Burdett	Baronet (of Bramcott); 1696–1716	Succeeded by Robert Burdett
