= Alexander Cannon =

Alexander or Alex Cannon may refer to:

- Alex Cannon (Big Brother)
- Alex Cannon, producer on Surrogate Valentine
- Alexander Cannon (general), Scottish soldier
- Alexander Cannon (psychiatrist), British psychiatrist
- Zander Cannon, American cartoonist
