= Richard Dyott (died 1719) =

English landowner and politician

Richard Dyott (9 May 1667 – 13 May 1719) of Freeford Manor, near Lichfield was an English landowner and politician who sat in the House of Commons in three periods between 1690 and 1710.

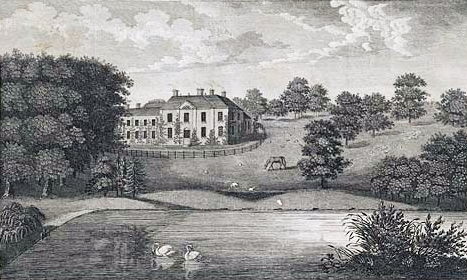
Freeford Hall (now Freeford Manor)

Dyott was the son of Richard Dyott of Freeford Manor and his second wife Anne Greene and succeeded his father in 1677.

In 1690 Dyott was elected Member of Parliament for Lichfield and held the seat until 1695. He was re-elected for Lichfield in 1698 and held the seat until 1708. He was elected again in 1710 and retained the seat until 1715.

Dyott married Frances Inge, daughter of William Inge of Thorpe Constantine on 20 September 1685. They had 2 sons, one of whom predeceased his father, and 4 daughters.

Parliament of England
Preceded by Robert Burdett; Sir Michael Biddulph, Bt	Member of Parliament for Lichfield; 1690–1695; With: Robert Burdett	Succeeded by Robert Burdett; Sir Michael Biddulph, Bt
Preceded by Robert Burdett; Sir Michael Biddulph, Bt	Member of Parliament for Lichfield; 1698–1707; With: Sir Michael Biddulph, Bt 1698–1701, 1701–1705; William Walmisley 1701; Sir Henry Gough 1705–1707	Succeeded by Parliament of Great Britain
Parliament of Great Britain
Preceded by Parliament of England	Member of Parliament for Lichfield; 1707–1708; With: Sir Henry Gough	Succeeded by Sir Michael Biddulph, Bt; John Cotes
Preceded by Sir Michael Biddulph, Bt; John Cotes	Member of Parliament for Lichfield; 1710–1715; With: John Cotes	Succeeded by Walter Chetwynd; Samuel Hill
