= Henry Gough (1649–1724) =

English politician (1649-1724)

Sir Henry Gough
- Born: 3 January 1649
- Died: 24 January 1724 (aged 75)

Sir Henry Gough (3 January 1649 – 24 January 1724) of Perry Hall, then in Staffordshire, was an English politician who sat in the House of Commons between 1685 and 1705.

Gough was the eldest son of John Gough (died 1665) of Old Fallings and his second wife, Bridget, the daughter of Sir John Astley of Woodeaton, Oxfordshire. He was the elder brother of Sir Richard Gough. He matriculated at Christ Church, Oxford, in 1666 and entered Middle Temple in 1667. He lived at Perry Hall in Staffordshire. He married Mary Littleton, the daughter of Sir Edward Littleton, 2nd Bt., of Pillaton Hall, Staffordshire in 1668.

Gough was High Sheriff of Staffordshire for the year 1671 to 1672. In 1678, he was knighted for services his grandfather rendered to Charles I in 1642. He was elected as a Tory Member of Parliament for Tamworth in 1685, 1689 and 1699. In 1705, he was elected MP for Lichfield.

Gough died on 24 January 1724 and was buried at Bushbury. Only three of his eleven sons survived including Harry Gough (1681–1751).

Parliament of England
Preceded by Sir Thomas Thynne, Bt; John Swinfen	Member of Parliament for Tamworth; 1685–1698; With: Richard Howe 1685–1689; Henry Sidney 1689; Henry Boyle 1689–1690; Michael Biddulph 1690–1695; Thomas Guy 1695–1698	Succeeded by Thomas Guy; John Chetwynd
Preceded by Thomas Guy; John Chetwynd	Member of Parliament for Tamworth; 1699–1701; With: Thomas Guy	Succeeded by Thomas Guy; Henry Thynne
Preceded by Richard Dyott; Sir Michael Biddulph, Bt	Member of Parliament for Lichfield; 1705; With: Richard Dyott	Succeeded by John Cotes; Sir Michael Biddulph, Bt
