= Richard Dyott =

Richard Dyott is the name of:

- Richard Dyott (1591–1660), English lawyer and politician who sat in the House of Commons between 1623 and 1640
- Richard Dyott (1619–1677), English landowner and politician who sat in the House of Commons between 1667 and 1677
- Richard Dyott (1667–1719), English landowner and politician who sat in the House of Commons in three periods between 1690 and 1710
- Richard Dyott (1808–1891), English Conservative politician who sat in the House of Commons from 1865 to 1880
