= Dyott =

Dyott is a surname. Notable people with the surname include:

- Anthony Dyott, English lawyer and politician who sat in the House of Commons between 1601 and 1614
- George Dyott, British pioneer aviator and explorer of the Amazon
- Richard Dyott (disambiguation), any of four different British politicians
