= Richard Dyott (died 1677) =

English landowner and politician

Richard Dyott (1619 – 5 November 1677) was an English landowner and politician who sat in the House of Commons between 1667 and 1677. He was a Royalist soldier who fought in the English Civil War.

Dyott was the son of Richard Dyott of Freeford Manor, near Lichfield and his wife Dorothy Dorrington, daughter of Richard Dorrington of Stafford. He was captain of the Lichfield Volunteers who fought for King Charles I at the Battle of Edgehill. He accompanied the royal family to the Netherlands during the Commonwealth and returned to England shortly before the Restoration.

In 1667 Dyott was elected Member of Parliament for Lichfield. He held the seat until his death in 1677.

Dyott married firstly on 7 February 1664 Katherine Gresley, daughter of Thomas Gresley of Drakelow. He married secondly on 28 April 1670 Anne Greene, by whom he had a son Richard.

Parliament of England
| Preceded by John Lane; Sir Theophilus Biddulph, Bt | Member of Parliament for Lichfield; 1667–1677; With: Sir Theophilus Biddulph, Bt | Succeeded by Sir Henry Lyttelton, Bt; Sir Theophilus Biddulph, Bt |
