= Statue of Thomas Guy =

Statue in Guy's Hospital, London

Coordinates: 51.5043°N 0.0879°W

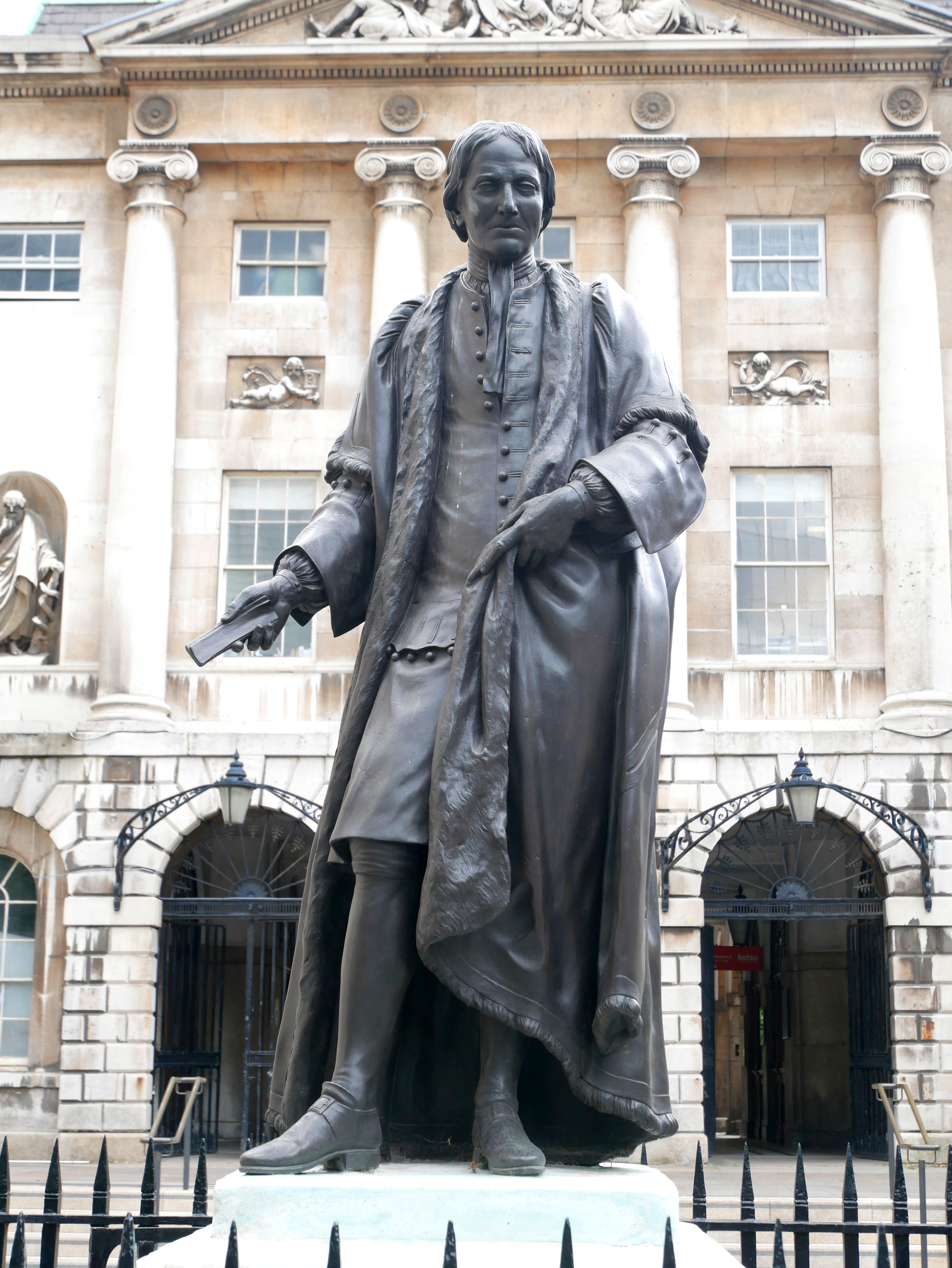
- The statue in 2020
- Artist: Peter Scheemakers
- Completion date: c. 1732
- Subject: Thomas Guy
- Location: London, England
- Owner: Guy's & St Thomas' Foundation
- Website: www.gsttfoundation.org.uk

A statue of Thomas Guy stands in the forecourt of Guy's Hospital in the borough of Southwark in Central London. The statue is Grade II listed.

Due to Guy's controversial connection with the Transatlantic Slave trade, the statue has come under scrutiny.

== History ==
Thomas Guy was a British member of Parliament, investor and bookseller. He held shares in the South Sea Company. Due to a brief period where the company attempted to sell slaves in Spanish America, he is seen as a controversial figure.

The bronze statue was cast by Peter Scheemakers between 1731 and 1734.

In June 2020, during the George Floyd protests in the United Kingdom following the murder of George Floyd in Minneapolis, Minnesota, many controversial statues became the target of attacks and scrutiny. The Mayor of London Sadiq Khan established the Commission for Diversity in the Public Realm in order to review statues and monuments in the city. The Guy's and St Thomas' NHS Foundation Trust announced that they would work with Khan on the issue. The Statue was boarded up on 12 June. In November 2022, the hoarding around the statue was removed and a plaque explaining Guy's role in the Transatlantic Slave Trade was erected.

== See also ==
- List of monuments and memorials removed during the George Floyd protests
- List of public art formerly in London
- List of public statues of individuals linked to the Atlantic slave trade
