= Freeford Hall =

Country house in Staffordshire, England

Coordinates: 52.6657°N 1.8008°W

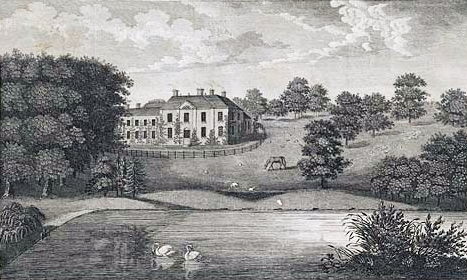
Freeford Hall c.1797

Freeford Manor (previously known as Freeford Hall) is a privately owned 18th-century country house at Freeford, near Lichfield, Staffordshire. It is the home of the Dyott family and is a Grade II listed building.

The Dyotts of Lichfield acquired interests in the manor of Freeford over many years from about 1606. When Richard Dyott, Member of Parliament for Lichfield 1690-1715 died in 1719, his son, also Richard decided to move from the city to live at Freeford.

In about 1730 he built a new small three bayed red brick house which was extended and improved throughout the 18th century. His son, another Richard was Recorder of Lichfield and in 1798 High Sheriff of Staffordshire. His nephew yet another Richard Dyott of Freeford, MP for Lichfield 1865-74, carried out substantial improvements to the house under the direction of Joseph Potter, the elder, architect of Lichfield in the mid 19th century and alterations later continued to create the existing mansion.

In 1891 a cousin Richard Burnaby, who changed his surname to Dyott, inherited the estate.

The Dyott family have a chapel dedicated to them in the north end of St Mary's Church, Lichfield.
