= Alexander Cannon (general) =

Scottish professional soldier

- Born: c. 1640; Kirkcudbrightshire, Galloway, Scotland
- Died: after 1708
- Military career
- Allegiance: Dutch Republic; England; Jacobite
- Branch: Army
- Rank: Major general
- Units: 2nd English Regiment, Scots Brigade (Note: Until 1689, the Brigade normally composed three Scottish and three English regiments but is usually referred to as 'Scots.'); Queen Consort's Light Dragoons, later 3rd King's Hussars
- Commands: Jacobite army in Scotland, July to December 1689
- Conflicts: Jacobite rising of 1689; Killiecrankie; Dunkeld; Cromdale

Alexander Cannon (c. 1640 – after 1708) was a Scottish professional soldier in the second half of the 17th century, who served in the armies of William of Orange and James VII and II.

He remained loyal to James at the 1688 Glorious Revolution, accompanied him into exile and was appointed Major-General of Jacobite forces in Scotland after the death of Viscount Dundee in July 1689. He was replaced by Thomas Buchan in early 1690 but served as his subordinate until both were given safe passage to France in 1692. Little is known of his later career; he was mentioned as still being in Jacobite service in 1708 and died sometime after that.

== Life ==
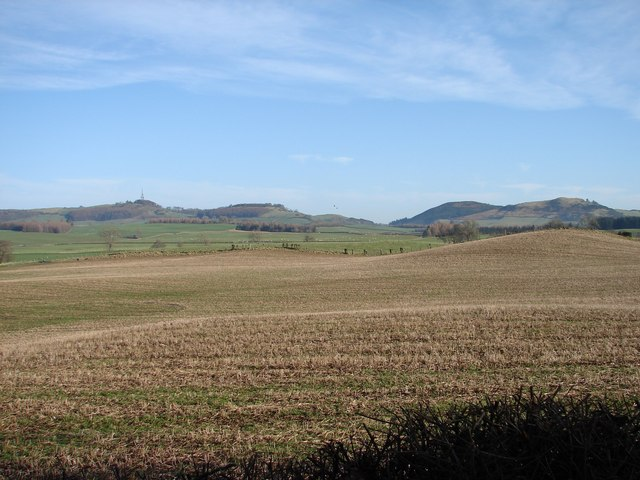
Arnmannoch

Alexander Cannon or Cannan was born in the Stewartry of Kirkcudbright, in the western province of Galloway; his family were members of the small Scottish Catholic community and in 1640 when Alexander was born, they were recorded as 'delinquents' by the Covenanter government that ruled Scotland.

Details of his background are scarce but the Cannan or Cannon family owned properties at Arnmannoch and Knocklea. This makes it likely they were involved in trading cattle between Ulster and Galloway, which may account for Alexander being referred to as 'Irish' by some writers.

== Career ==
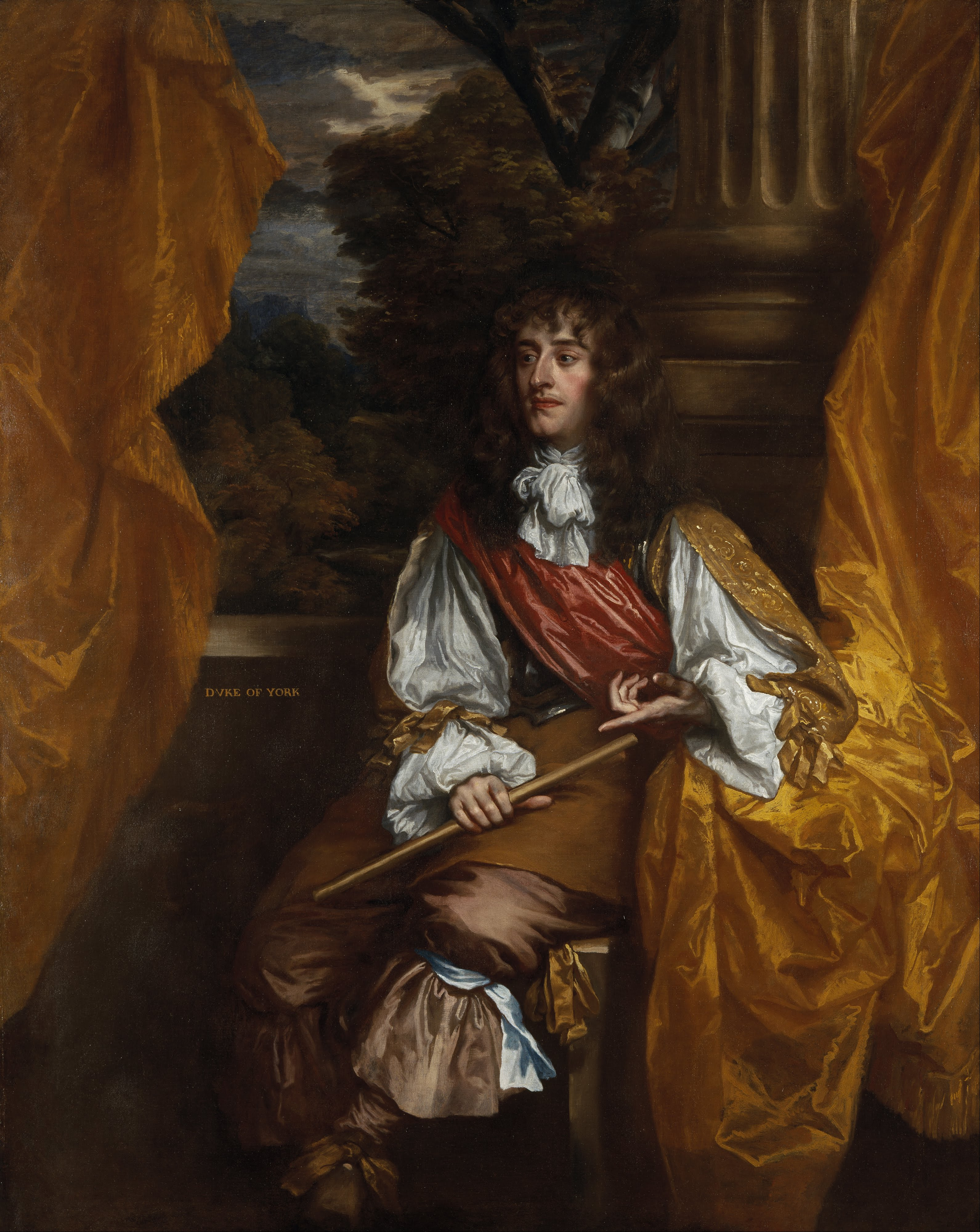
James VII and II

Cannon spent much of his career in the Scots Brigade, a unit in Dutch service under William of Orange; despite the name, for much of this period it contained three English and three Scottish regiments. (Note: The English regiments were recalled when the Second Anglo-Dutch War began in 1672, reinstated when it ended in 1674 then finally replaced with three additional Scottish ones in 1689.) In July 1680, he became Colonel of one of the English regiments and accompanied it to England in 1685 when the brigade was sent to help James II suppress the Monmouth rebellion. The revolt quickly collapsed and the brigade returned to the Netherlands without seeing action but Cannon remained and in August 1685, he was appointed Lt-Colonel of the newly formed Queen Consort's Light Dragoons, the Duke of Somerset filling the largely ceremonial post of Colonel.

In August 1687, Cannon succeeded Somerset as Colonel when the Duke fell from favour and was with James when William landed at Torbay on 5 November 1688, in the invasion known as the Glorious Revolution. The Royal army simply changed sides, including the majority of Cannon's regiment; he went into exile with James and on 31 December 1688, Richard Leveson replaced him as Colonel.

In March 1689, Cannon accompanied James when he landed in Ireland in an attempt to regain his throne, initiating the Williamite War in Ireland. A simultaneous rising in Scotland was launched by Viscount Dundee; this relied on support from Jacobite-controlled areas in County Antrim, which was far more difficult after the loss of Kintyre in May.

On 27 June 1689, Dundee wrote to Melfort, James' Secretary of State, asking for 3,000 to 5,000 troops and munitions of various kinds. However, this was impacted by the factional struggle between Jacobite Compounders and Non-Compounders who were reluctant to divert resources needed in Ireland. (Note: Non-Compounders urged James to refuse any concessions to regain his throne while Compounders saw it as a necessity. According to Daniel Szechi, Non-Compounders were almost exclusively Catholic while Compounders were without exception Protestant.) The Non-Compounders sought to replace Dundee with Thomas Buchan but he was needed for the siege of Derry.

Instead, Cannon and 300 men were ferried across the Irish Sea in small boats, landing at Duart on 21 July and reaching Blair Castle on 26 July in time for the Battle of Killiecrankie, where Dundee was killed in the closing stages. Cannon assumed command but contemporaries like Lochiel considered him a poor choice, handicapped by his unfamiliarity with Highland customs and inability to speak Gaelic. Lochiel later claimed he also spent much of his time drinking with the Earl of Dunfermline, although heavy drinking was hardly unusual in this period.

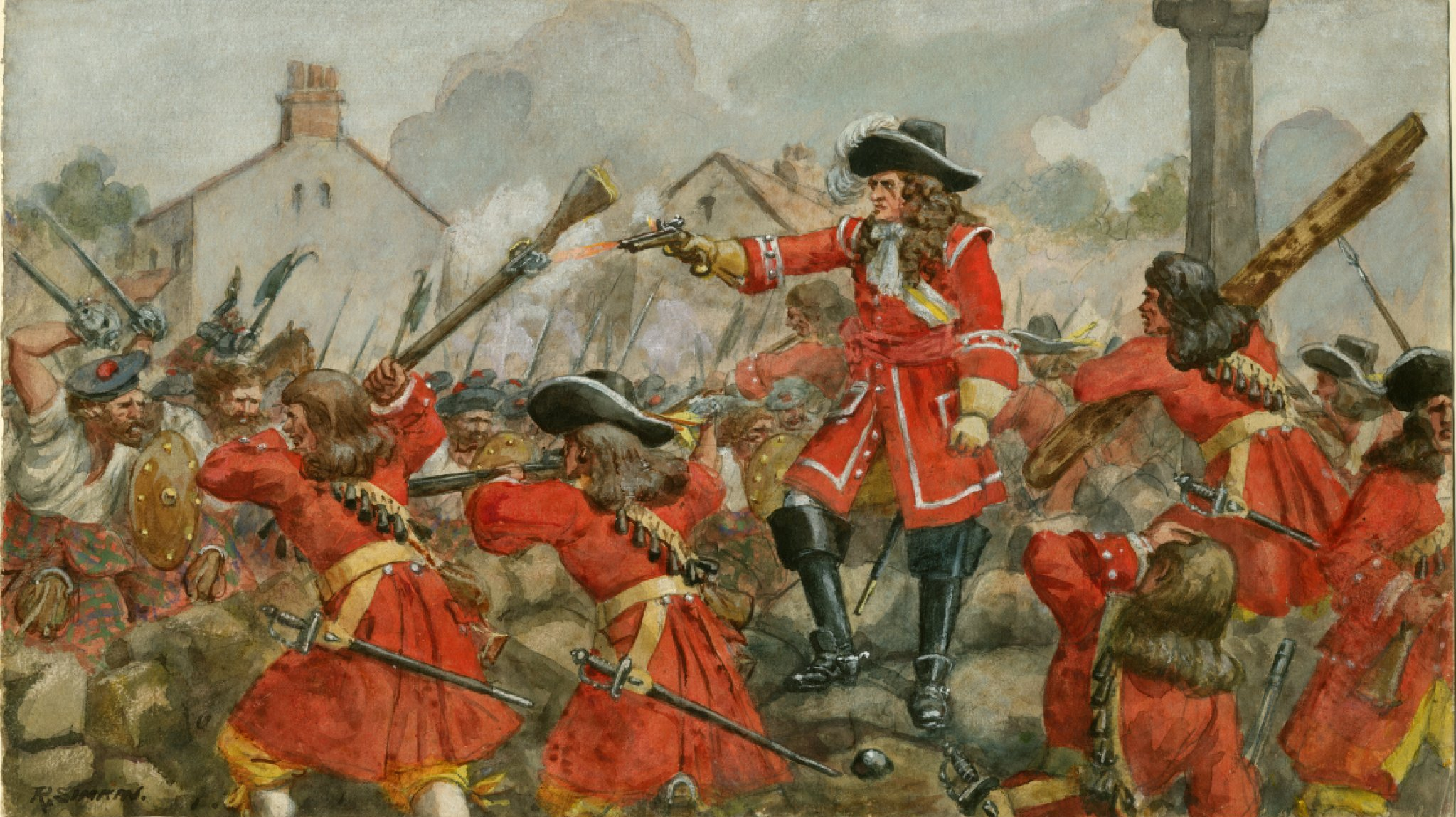
Dunkeld; the Cameronians repel the Highlander assault

Victory at Killiecrankie did little to change the strategic position; in February 1690, Buchan and Lochiel mirrored Dundee's letter of June 1689 by requesting money, weapons plus 4,000-foot and 1,000 cavalry. These demands were unrealistic, while the lack of support from the Scottish nobility led to a request that James' illegitimate son the Duke of Berwick be appointed leader. Obtaining supplies still required access to a major port; since the Royal Navy had re-established control over the Irish Sea by breaking the Siege of Derry, Cannon headed for Aberdeenshire, an area dominated by the Catholic Gordons and an Episcopalian and Royalist stronghold since the 1630s.

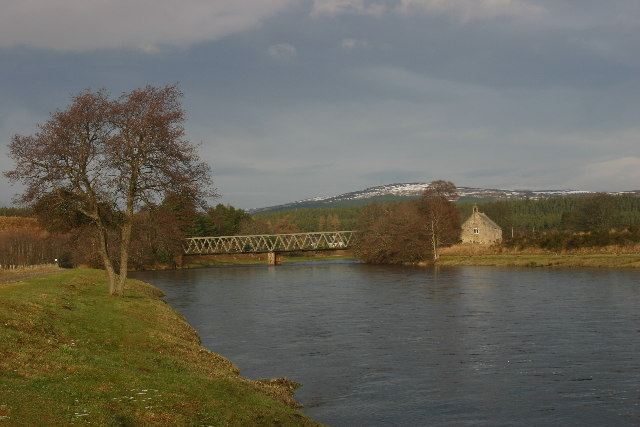
Bridge over the Spey at Cromdale; the Jacobites were taken by surprise and retreated across the river here in May 1690

However, an advance on Edinburgh was blocked by Stirling Castle which the Jacobites failed to capture in 1746 with considerably better siege equipment, while lack of cavalry made them vulnerable in the open. Even experienced leaders like Dundee found it hard to keep a Highland army in the field, while the increase in numbers after Killiecrankie to 4,000 – 5,000 did not necessarily improve fighting capacity. Supplying a force of this size was far more difficult and the new recruits included many like the MacGregors who saw it primarily as an opportunity for raiding.

Once Cannon was prevented from reaching Aberdeen, his options were limited; the Battle of Dunkeld on 21 August makes little strategic sense since Highland tactics were unsuited to urban warfare and they were repulsed with heavy losses. The Jacobite army now effectively disbanded itself by going home while Cannon and his remaining Irish troops spent the winter on the Island of Mull. In February 1690, Thomas Buchan assumed command but their force of 800 men were scattered at the Battle of Cromdale in May, although Cannon, Buchan and several others escaped. They now retraced Cannon's route the previous year by heading for Aberdeenshire and managed to assemble several hundred men but lacked the means to attack Aberdeen itself, while the government army continued to pursue him and his forces once more dwindled away.

Effective Jacobite resistance ceased with the surrender of Kenneth Mackenzie, 4th Earl of Seaforth; Cannon and Buchan took refuge first in Mull, then Lochaber, where they were protected by the MacDonald chief Glengarry. After the Highland chiefs swore allegiance to the new government in January 1692, Cannon and Buchan were given safe conduct passes to leave Scotland, landing at Le Havre in April.

Details of his later life are scarce but the exiled Jacobite politician and agent George Lockhart records being accompanied by Cannon on a visit to Scotland in March 1708.

== Bibliography ==
- Black, Jeremy (1998). Britain As A Military Power, 1688-1815 (2016 ed.). Routledge. ISBN 1138987913.
- Bolitho, Hector (1963). The Galloping Third: The Story of the 3rd the King's Own Hussars. Murray. ISBN 1135540497.
- Cannon, Richard (1846). Historical Record of the Third or King's Own Regiment of Light Dragoons (2015 ed.). Forgotten Books. ISBN 1-330-44220-2.
- Childs, John (2008). The Williamite Wars in Ireland. Bloomsbury. ISBN 978-1-84725-164-0.
- Glozier, Matthew (2004). Scottish Soldiers in France in the Reign of the Sun King. Brill. ISBN 900413865X.
- Lenman, Bruce (1995). The Jacobite Risings in Britain, 1689–1746. Scottish Cultural Press. ISBN 1-898218-20-X.
- Livingston, Alistair (2009). The Galloway Levellers - A Study of the Origins, Events and Consequences of their Actions. University of Glasgow PHD.
- Macpherson, James (1775). Original Papers: Containing the Secret History of Great Britain (2017 ed.). Hansebooks. ISBN 3-7434-3572-1.
- Mann, Alastair (2014). James VII: Duke and King of Scots, 1633–1701 (The Stewart Dynasty in Scotland). John Donald Short Run Press. ISBN 978-1-904607-90-8.
- Milne, Norman (2010). Scottish Culture and Traditions During the Late 17th and Early 18th Centuries. Paragon. ISBN 978-1-899820-79-5.
- Nicholson, James (1804). Minute Book kept by the War Committee of the Covenanters in the Stewartry of Kircudbright 1640 & 1641.
- Robertson, Barry (2014). Royalists at War in Scotland and Ireland, 1638–1650. Routledge. pp. 2–22 passim. ISBN 978-1409457473.
- Szechi, Daniel (1994). The Jacobites: Britain and Europe, 1688–1788. Manchester University Press. ISBN 0-7190-3774-3.
- Terry, Charles (1922). The Jacobites and the Union: Being A Narrative Of The Movements Of 1708, 1715, 1719 By Several Contemporary Hands (2014 ed.). Cambridge University Press. ISBN 1-107-42592-1..
