= Alexander Cannon (psychiatrist) =

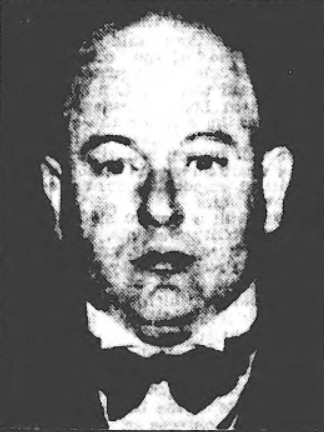
- Born: James Alexander Cannon; 4 August 1896; Leeds, England
- Died: 18 March 1963 (aged 66); Douglas, Isle of Man
- Citizenship: British
- Education: University of Leeds; University of London; University of Vienna; University of Hong Kong
- Known for: Influence on King Edward VIII
- Scientific career
- Fields: Psychiatry, Occult, Hypnosis
- Workplaces: Colney Hatch Mental Hospital; Isle of Man Clinic for Nervous Diseases

James Alexander Cannon (4 August 1896 – 18 March 1963) was a British psychiatrist, occultist, hypnotist and author. He became well known in the 1930s for his occult writings and claims, and more recently for his alleged influence on King Edward VIII shortly before his abdication.

== Early life and career ==
He was born in Leeds, England, and educated at Leeds, London, Vienna, Hong Kong, and several other universities, eventually receiving both an MD and PhD. Later he trained in various Eastern spiritual disciplines, acquiring or claiming such titles as "Kushog Yogi of Northern Thibet" and "Master-The-Fifth of the Great White Lodge of the Himalayas."

In Hong Kong in the late 1920s and early 1930s, he became vice-president of the Hong Kong Medical Society, medical officer in charge of prisons, head of the Department of Morbid Anatomy at the University of Hong Kong, and psychiatrist and medical jurist to the High Court of Justice.

He also served as British Consul and Port Medical Officer in Canton (Guangzhou). He studied occultism and yoga and travelled in India, China and Tibet. In his book The Invisible Influence (1933), he claimed that during his travels he was levitated over a chasm in Tibet, together with his porters and luggage. The book was structured as a conversation between Cannon and a series of mystics, yogis, and other sages, and includes anecdotes of crystal gazing, levitation, hypnotism, distant-touching, and other supposed phenomena. The book ran to at least 26 impressions by 1948.

After his return to England, he was awarded a Diploma in Psychological Medicine (DPM) from the Royal College of Physicians of London and Royal College of Surgeons of England in 1931. Cannon served as psychiatrist and research scientist at Colney Hatch Mental Hospital. After learning of his book, London County Council dismissed him on the grounds that he was unfit to practice in charge of a mental hospital, but he was reinstated after bringing action for wrongful dismissal. He then set up in private practice as a consultant in Harley Street, London, where he used hypnotherapy and psychic mediums in diagnosis. He became well known for prescribing exotic remedies such as electrotherapy and Tibetan hypnosis techniques as treatments for stress, alcoholism, sex and confidence problems.

In 1939, he was a vice-president of the British Phrenological Society.

== Influence on King Edward VIII ==
According to recent research, during this period King Edward VIII consulted Cannon, and received hypnotic treatment from him for a drink problem. This was drawn to the attention of Dr Cosmo Lang, the Archbishop of Canterbury. Two days before the King's abdication in December 1936, Lang wrote to another Harley Street doctor, William Brown, that he had been "informed by a credible person that a certain Dr Cannon... has been recently attending the King... Would you kindly tell me whether you think this Dr Cannon is a really trustworthy person? He seems from the accounts I have received to be one who encourages somewhat dangerous methods of treatment." Archived letters suggest that it was believed that Cannon — then known as "the Yorkshire Yogi" — was having an adverse influence on the King. Piers Compton, former literary editor of the Catholic newspaper The Universe, stated that he had been told that King Edward was in the grip of "the leader of black magic in England", who had been called in to treat him for drunkenness. However, Edward's biographer Philip Ziegler considered it more likely that the treatment may have been for a sexual problem.

== Later life ==
By the late 1930s, Cannon's London clinic, where he billed himself fraudulently as "His Excellency Sir Dr Alexander Cannon", had become highly lucrative. He continued to work and publish. In 1938, in his book Sleeping Through Space, he gave directions for bringing the dead back to life: "[administer] a severe kick with the knee between the shoulder blades" at the same time shouting in [the] left ear "Oye," "Oye," "Oye." He added: "It is rarely necessary to repeat the operation before life is again resumed, but this can be repeated up to seven times in long-standing cases."

In 1939, Cannon left London and established the Isle of Man Clinic for Nervous Diseases. In the Isle of Man, he was a friend of Captain George Drummond, a Nazi sympathiser who had entertained the Prince of Wales and was interned in his mansion on his island during the war. Cannon was himself suspected of being a Nazi sympathiser and German spy, his telephone conversations with Drummond were recorded by MI5, and he was forced out of his home. However, MI5 concluded that he was a "quack and compulsive liar" rather than a spy.

In October 1938, he falsely predicted that 1939 would see "the rapid wane of Hitler" and Mussolini. By 1941, he was being evicted from his Douglas mansion and was in trouble once again with medical authorities. He was brought up on disciplinary charges that in July 1941 he mailed a prison warden certificates attesting to his serious illness and that the man required immediate rest, even though Cannon had not seen him since March 1940. His solicitor claimed Cannon had diagnosed the man "hypnotically through a third person." The General Medical Council declined to revoke his licence, finding that although the charges were proven, Cannon's actions were not done with the intention to commit fraud but owing to his mistaken belief in his own abilities.

When the war ended, Cannon began to produce live magic shows using two assistants, Joyce and Rhonda Deronda (born Joyce and Eleanor Robson), who helped with performances. One act involved putting Rhonda into a hypnotic trance to diagnose physical and psychological problems, as she glared at the patient. Some of his apparently magical techniques were exposed in 1952 by David Norris.

Cannon was a member of the International Brotherhood of Magicians and The Magic Circle, and was Chairman of the Magicians of Mann. He created 'The Enchanted Hall', a small theatre at his home, Laureston Mansion House in Douglas. A number of tape recordings made by Cannon are on loan to the Manx Museum and National Trust.

He also claimed to have invented the lie detector and black light. He died in March 1963, in the Isle of Man.

== Bibliography ==
- Hypnotism, Suggestion and Faith Healing (1932)
- The Principles and Practice of Psychiatry, senior author (1932)
- The Invisible Influence (1933)
- The Principles and Practice of Neurology, senior author (1934)
- Powers That Be (1934)
- The Secret of Mind Power and How to Use It, co-authored with C. de Radwan (1935)
- The Power of Karma in Relation to Destiny (1936)
- The Science of Hypnotism (1936)
- Sleeping Through Space (1938)
- The Shadow of Destiny (1947)
- The Power Within (1953)
- The Secret Scroll (1950s; more likely 1925 and published by the author for private circulation)
