= Richard Leveson (died 1699) =

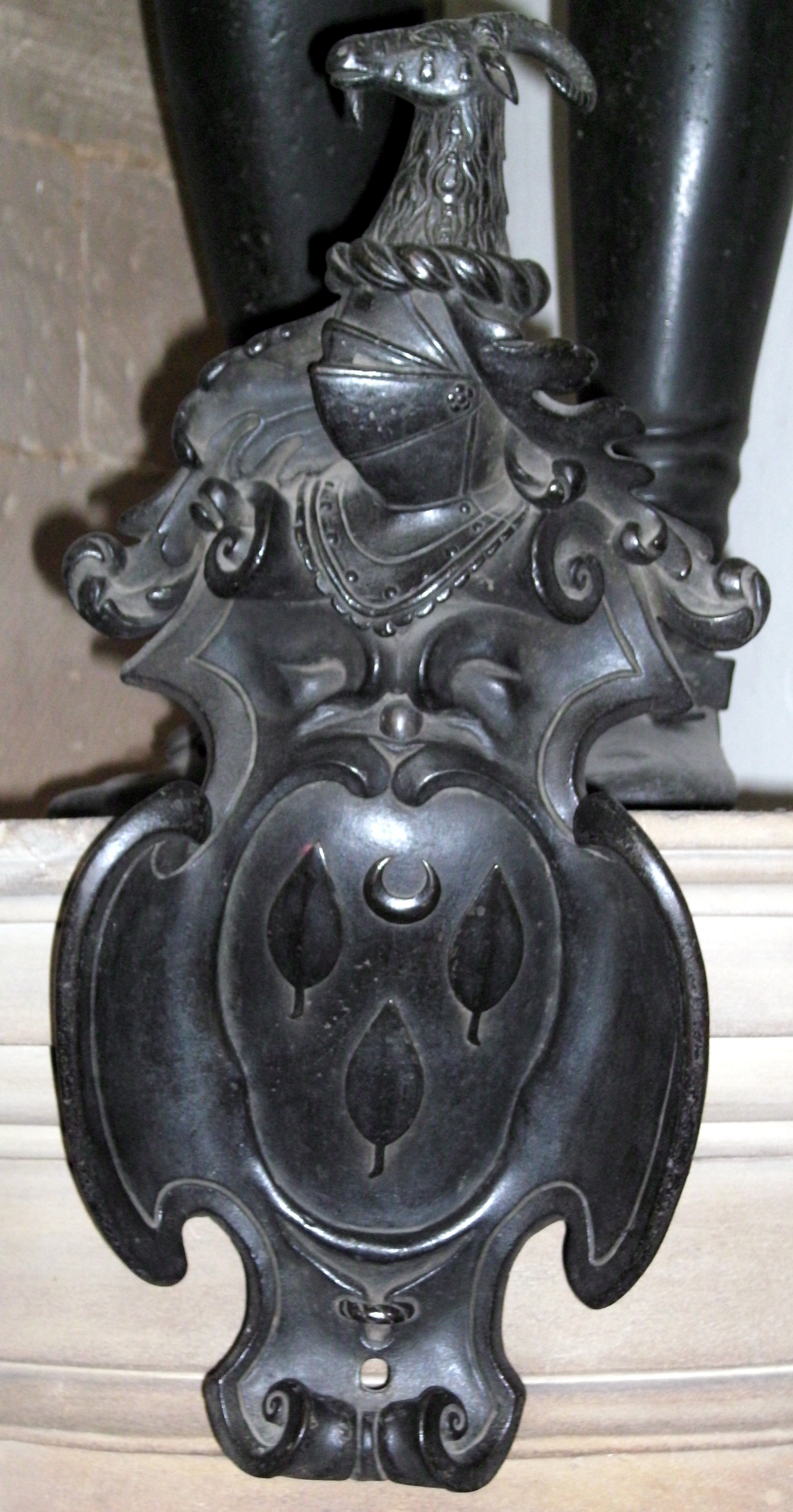
- Leveson coat of arms, on memorial in St Peter's Collegiate Church

Member of Parliament for Newport, Isle of Wight
- In office December 1692 – October 1695

Governor of Berwick-upon-Tweed
- In office 1691–1699

Member of Parliament for Lichfield
- In office May 1685 – July 1687

Personal details
- Born: 12 July 1659 Wolverhampton, Staffordshire
- Died: 24 March 1699 (aged 39)
- Children: Two illegitimate sons

Military service
- Rank: Brigadier-General
- Battles/wars: Monmouth Rebellion; Williamite War in Ireland; Battle of the Boyne; Battle of Aughrim; Nine Years War

Brigadier-General Richard Leveson (12 July 1659 – March 1699) was the son of a wealthy merchant from Wolverhampton, who served in the army of James II until the November 1688 Glorious Revolution, when he defected to join William III. He fought in Ireland and Flanders, sat as MP for Lichfield and Newport, and was Governor of Berwick-upon-Tweed from 1691 until his death in March 1699.

== Personal details ==
Richard Leveson was born on 12 July 1659, eldest of three sons of Sarah (d. 1707) and Robert Leveson (d. 1709), a wealthy merchant from Wolverhampton in Staffordshire. He does not appear to have married, although his will left money to two illegitimate sons, with the balance going to his two brothers.

His relatives included Sir Richard Leveson (1598-1661) of Trentham Hall, another Royalist, as well as the Leveson-Gower family.

== Career ==
During the Wars of the Three Kingdoms, his Catholic grandfather Thomas held Dudley Castle for Charles I from 1643 to 1646; one of 25 former Royalists named by Parliament in 1651 as subject to "perpetual banishment and confiscation", he died in exile on 8 September 1652. Despite the losses caused by the Civil Wars, in 1660 Robert Leveson's annual income was still around £700, a comfortable income for the period, while he was closely involved in Staffordshire politics, for example, helping the Government implement the 1661 Corporation Act in the boroughs.

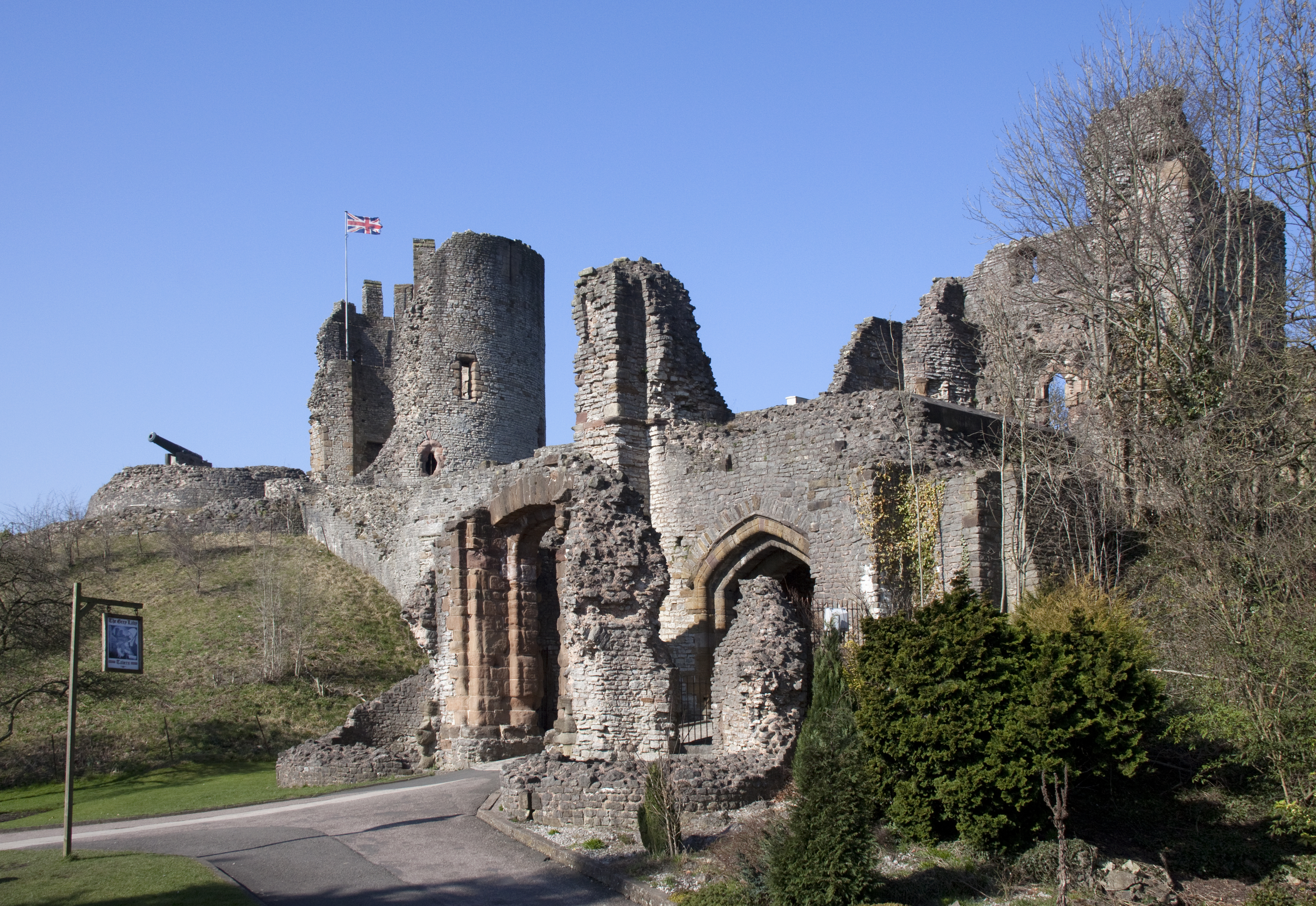
Dudley Castle; his grandfather Thomas commanded the Royalist garrison 1643–46.

While neither Richard nor his father Robert were Catholic, they were a substantial and important county family, connected to the future James II through Sarah's father Thomas Povey, his Treasurer from 1660 to 1668. (Note: Samuel Pepys records him as being 'a wretched accountant', and in 1668 Povey sold his position as James' Treasurer for £2,000.) When James became King in February 1685, Richard was appointed Groom of the Chamber; the function of such positions was less important than the status which indicated physical proximity and thus the King's favour. In May, he was elected as one of two MPs for Lichfield in what was known as the Loyal Parliament.

Leveson was Captain of a troop of dragoons when the Monmouth Rebellion broke out in June 1685. Although the revolt quickly collapsed, James used the opportunity to expand his army, and in August Leveson's troop became part of a new regiment, with Alexander Cannon as Lt-Colonel and the Duke of Somerset as Colonel. Cannon became Colonel when Somerset fell from favour in August 1687, with Leveson promoted to Lt-Colonel.

In late 1687, James tried to ensure a Parliament that would vote for his Declaration of Indulgence, by demanding that all candidates confirm their support for repealing the 1678 Test Act, a measure which required holders of public office to swear to uphold 'the Protestant religion.' Although Robert Leveson confirmed his willingness to do so, his son Richard refused; combined with the trial of the Seven Bishops for seditious libel in June 1688, many of James' supporters now viewed his policies as going beyond toleration for Catholicism into an assault on the Church of England. The vast majority now abandoned him; the seven signatories of the Invitation to William asking him to assume the English throne included representatives from the Tories, the Whigs, the Church and the Navy.

The Battle of the Boyne, which Leveson fought in

William III landed at Torbay on 5 November 1688 in the invasion known as the Glorious Revolution; with the exception of Cannon, Leveson and the majority of the Regiment defected, an action leading to his exclusion from a General Amnesty issued by James in May 1692. When William appointed him Colonel in place of Cannon, the regiment became known as 'Leveson's Dragoons,' since units were then considered the property of their Colonel, and changed names when transferred. The regiment served in the 1689-1691 Williamite War in Ireland and fought at the Boyne in July 1690, Leveson being promoted Brigadier-General.

While on leave in London in early 1691, he fought a duel with Sir Henry Belasyse, a fellow officer in Ireland. At this time, he was also appointed Governor of Berwick-upon-Tweed, a position he held until his death, although mostly absent. Jacobite defeat at Aughrim in August 1691 led to the Treaty of Limerick ending the war in Ireland; his regiment returned to England in February 1692 and December was returned as MP for Newport, Isle of Wight. On 19 January 1694, he transferred to the Third Regiment of Horse and returned to full-time military service in Flanders. He did not stand for Parliament in 1695 and remained in Flanders until the Treaty of Ryswick in 1697 ended the Nine Years War. He died in March 1699.

== Sources ==
- Cannon, Richard (1846). Historical Record of the Third or King's Own Regiment of Light Dragoons (2015 ed.). Forgotten Books. ISBN 1-330-44220-2.
- Chandler, David; Beckett, Ian (1996). The Oxford History of the British Army (2002 ed.). Oxford University Press. ISBN 0-19-280311-5.
- Halliday, Paul (2008). Dismembering the Body Politic: Partisan Politics in England's Towns, 1650-1730. Cambridge University Press. ISBN 978-0521526043.
- Miller, John (2012). "Book Review; James II and the Three Questions: Religious Toleration and the Landed Classes, 1687–1688 by Peter Walker". Catholic Historical Review. 98 (1). doi:10.1353/cat.2012.0053. S2CID 162247466.
- Smith, G (2003). The Cavaliers in Exile 1640-1660 (2014 ed.). Palgrave Macmillan. ISBN 1349510718.
- Watson, Paula (2002). LEVESON, Richard (1659-99), of Wolverhampton, Staffs in The History of Parliament: the House of Commons 1690–1715. CUP. ISBN 978-0521772211.
