= Thomas Orme =

Thomas Orme (c. 1637 – 1716), of Hanch Hall, Longdon, Staffordshire, was an English Member of Parliament (MP).

He was a Member of the Parliament of England for Lichfield in 1685.
