= William Walmisley =

William Walmisley or Walmesley (died 1713), of The Close, Lichfield, Staffordshire, was an English Member of Parliament (MP). He was a Member of the Parliament of England for Lichfield February to November 1701.
