= John Cotes (1682–1756) =

British Member of Parliament (1682–1756)

John Cotes (1682–1756), of Woodcote, Shropshire, was an English Member of Parliament.

He was a Member (MP) of the Parliament of England for Lichfield 1708–1715.
