= Sarah, Lady Holte =

English landowner (1723–1794)

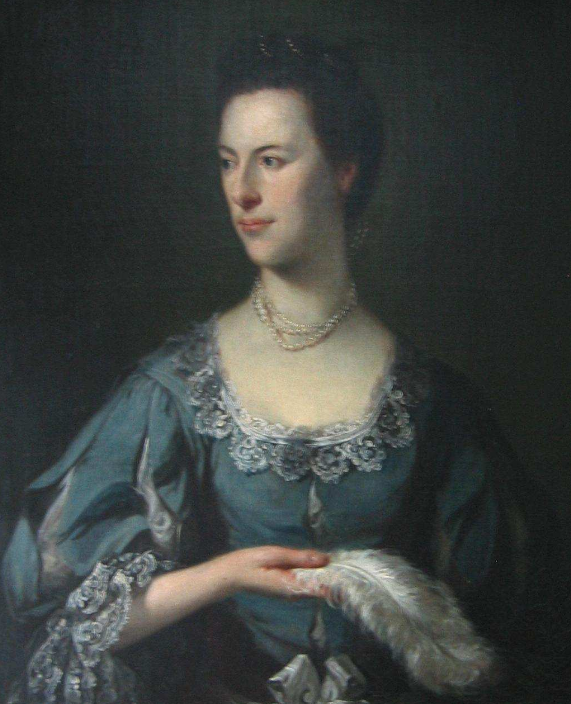
- Portrait c. 1763
- Born: Sarah Newton; December 1723
- Died: 1 April 1794 (aged 70); Aston Hall, Warwickshire, England
- Occupations: Landowner and heiress
- Spouse: Sir Lister Holte, 5th Baronet (m. 1755; died 1770)
- Parents: Samuel Newton (father); Elizabeth Fowler (mother)

Sarah, Lady Holte (née Newton; December 1723 – 1 April 1794), was an English landowner and heiress. She was raised in Staffordshire. Her family owned lands and hundreds of slaves cultivating sugar on the Caribbean island of Barbados. In 1755, she became the third wife of Sir Lister Holte, 5th Baronet, and lived with him at Aston Hall in Warwickshire.

Sir Lister's death in 1770 prompted a dispute regarding his will, which bequeathed her Aston Hall and most of his possessions and effectively disinherited his niece, Mary. Lister's brother and successor, Sir Charles, pursued legal action to dispute the will but Sarah prevailed in court. She later also inherited her family's properties in Barbados. She died childless and left her estates to various family members.

== Family background and early life ==
In the mid-17th century, Sarah's ancestors Robert and Samuel Newton acquired lands and established a plantation within the parish of Christ Church on the Caribbean island of Barbados. The estate was expanded and enriched the family by producing sugar, an increasingly profitable cash crop. Samuel Newton became one of the island's richest planters; by 1679, he owned 581 acres (235 ha) and 260 African slaves and used his wealth to purchase the neoclassical mansion Kings Bromley Hall in Staffordshire, which his descendants inherited and increased from 130 acres (53 ha) to over 2,000 acres (810 ha).

Sarah was Newton's great-granddaughter, the youngest of four children to Samuel Newton and his wife, Elizabeth Fowler. Born in 1723, she was raised at Kings Bromley Hall and only ever met one enslaved person. During her teenage years, the family had financial difficulties and her brother John was sent to Barbados to marry an heiress; the funds from his marriage would help fund the dowries for Sarah and her two sisters. Being the youngest, it was not expected that she would inherit her family's fortune.

== Marriage ==
On 30 June 1755, Sarah married Sir Lister Holte, 5th Baronet, as his third wife. He was thirty-five and she was unusually old for a first marriage, being thirty-two. While less wealthy than his previous two wives, she had a dowry of £2,000 and it was expected that she and her sisters would inherit their family's fortune, as John was childless despite 15 years of marriage. The Holte baronets were a prominent family in Warwickshire, England, that had owned lands in Aston since the 14th century. Their primary residence was at Aston Hall, which sat upon over 300 acres (120 ha) and was considered "the most superb in that neighbourhood, fit to grace the leading title of nobility". Lister had also been a Member of Parliament for Lichfield, and her family supported him during his 1741 election. A widower, he was considered to possess a "handsome face and good person" and she had known him for years.

Alfred Davidson, a Holte family historian, would later characterise Sarah as the controlling one in their relationship and described her as "haughty, cold and selfish". However, Davidson may have been biased due to his connection with Charles Holte's grandson. However, it is clear that a rift soon developed between the couple and Sir Lister's brother Charles and sister-in-law Anne. The historian Miranda Kaufman speculates that Sarah was possibly "insecure about her family background [and] jealously guarded and asserted her newfound status as a baronet's wife". For example, she appointed her friend, Ralph Pickstock, as steward of her husband's estates. The 1757 birth of a niece, Mary Elizabeth Holte, may have exacerbated tensions since Sarah had no children.

In 1763, the artist Tilly Kettle completed separate portraits of Sarah and her husband. In her portrait, which sits in a private collection, Sarah is described as "delicately painted, androgynous and pale, dressed to party in Van Dyck costume". By 1769, Lister's health was failing and they sought health treatments in Bath. However, upon their return to Aston Hall the following year, he was "far advanced in a dropsy, his legs, thighs and every surface of his body greatly swelled and distended with water". He pursued treatments with his doctors for three weeks before ultimately dying on 21 April 1770. None of his marriages produced any children, and his baronetcy was inherited by his brother.

== Inheritance ==
In Lister's will, described by the local historian William Hutton as "one of the most unaccountable assignments that ever resulted from human weakness," he left his widow the ownership of Aston Hall for life and most of his other possessions, as well as increasing her annuity to £1,500 a year. The will also disinherited his niece by dictating that she would be passed over in favour of his first wife's relatives. Only in the absence of their male children would Mary inherit the property. Sir Charles and his wife blamed Sarah and her family for influencing the terms of the will and sued in court to overturn it; by 1775 the case was settled in Sarah's favour.

While Sarah rarely resided at Aston Hall after Sir Lister's death, as she preferred to live on the Newton family's estate at Kings Bromley Hall, she still forbade her brother and sister-in-law from staying there. After the death of their brother in 1783, she and her unmarried sister Elizabeth inherited their family's Newton and Seawells estates in Barbados, becoming the owners of 430 enslaved people – including Dolly Newton – and controlling a fortune of £37,495. Living conditions for enslaved people at their Barbadian properties were harsh, as excavations at the Newton Slave Burial Ground would later reveal, with periodic starvation suffered by the slaves. The estate had recently experienced financial setbacks due to the Great Hurricane of 1780 and the American Revolution (1765–1783); after the war, their income recovered a few years later and was considered profitable relative to others in the region.

On 1 April 1794, at the age of seventy, Sarah died suddenly at Aston Hall in the presence of her sister. Elizabeth Newton commissioned Richard Westmacott to build a monument for Sarah and Sir Lister at the Church of SS Peter & Paul near Aston Hall "as a memorial of his virtues, and in compliance with the wishes of his Widow". As Sir Charles died before Sarah, he never resided at Aston. The residence was inherited by his first wife's nephew, Heneage Legge, as dictated in Lister's will. The family baronetcy went extinct. Upon Sarah's death, Elizabeth inherited their estates in Barbados. After her subsequent death nine months later, these estates were passed onto John and Thomas Lane, the sisters' second cousins. John had previously assisted Sarah with the legal dispute surrounding her husband's will. The Lane brothers divided the estates between them; the lands would remain in their family into the twentieth century, still cultivating sugar.
