= Sir Lister Holte, 5th Baronet =

British Member of Parliament (1720–1770)

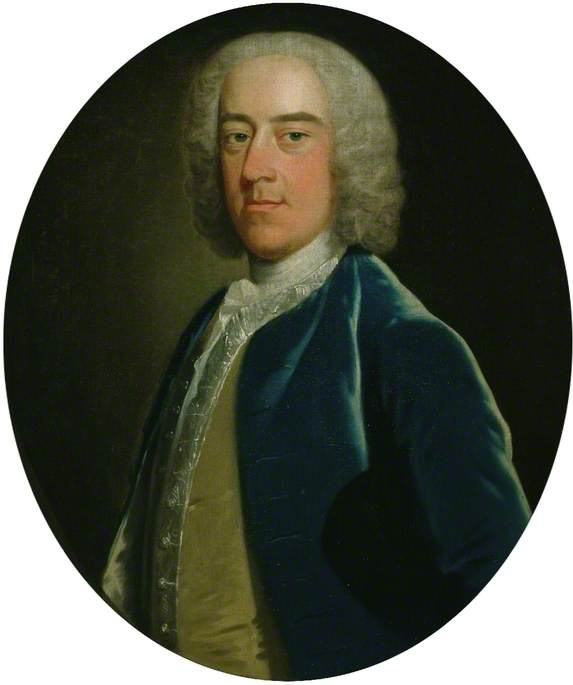
- Sir Lister Holte, portrait between 1750 and 1770
- Born: 26 April 1720
- Died: 21 April 1770 (aged 49); Aston Hall, Warwickshire, England
- Occupations: Politician and landowner
- Spouse(s): Lady Anne Legge; Mary Harpur; Sarah Newton
- Parents: Sir Clobery Holte, 4th Baronet (father); Barbara Lister (mother)

Sir Lister Holte, 5th Baronet (26 April 1720 – 21 April 1770) was an English landowner in Warwickshire and a Member of Parliament for Lichfield from 1741 to 1747. He was also High Sheriff of Cheshire.

The owner of Aston Hall for 40 years, Sir Lister married three times to well-connected or wealthy heiresses. After his death, his will was the subject of a legal dispute in the 1770s between members of his family which ended in his widow's favour. He was childless and the Holte baronetcy was inherited by his brother, Sir Charles.

== Family background and early life ==
The Holte baronets were a prominent family in Warwickshire, England, that had owned lands in Aston since the 14th century. In 1612, Thomas Holte – like many others – was raised to 1st Baronet by King James I as a means to raise funds and defence forces for the English Crown, in particular to help during a rebellion in Ireland. Their primary residence was at Aston Hall, built by Holte between 1618 and 1635. Sitting upon over 300 acres of park grounds, the estate was considered "the most superb in that neighbourhood, fit to grace the leading title of nobility".

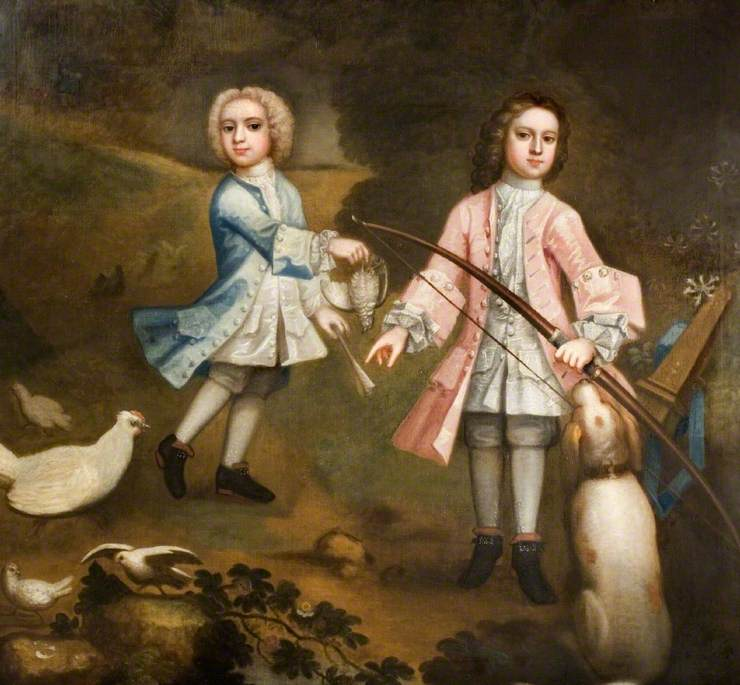
Sir Lister and his brother, by an anonymous artist (Birmingham Museums Trust)

Holte's descendant, Lister, was born on 26 April 1720 and baptised two days later. He had a brother named Charles who was one year younger. Their parents were Sir Clobery Holte, 4th Baronet and his wife Barbara Lister, daughter and heiress of Thomas Lister, Esq. The young Lister inherited his mother's maiden name. The marriage was apparently unhappy, and after the death of Sir Clobery on 25 July 1729, Lister succeeded to his father's baronetcy and estates. Due to the boys' young age, a guardianship was necessary. Their grandmother Anne, Lady Holte – rather than their mother – was appointed to this role. In 1735, Anne barred Barbara, who had remarried, from staying at Aston Hall for longer than seven consecutive days and no more than fourteen total days in a year.

Sir Clobery left very little to his wife, and his son would be the owner of Aston Hall for the next 40 years. Lister and his brother were close and studied together at Eton College and then at Magdalen College, Oxford. Sometime before Lady Holte's death in 1738, she sought out another guardian, engaging "the Earl of Dartmouth in the [boys'] affairs as far as he will please to concern himself in them". Dartmouth was a major landowner in the county, and she wrote him a letter estimating her grandson's income to be £4,000 per annum, suggesting that he marry the earl's daughter, and saying that "he is now as much master of his estate as a gentleman under age can be".

== Political career ==
A Tory, Sir Lister was a Member of Parliament (MP) for Lichfield from 1741 to 1747. Aged twenty-one, he ran unopposed and his connection to the Earl of Dartmouth likely helped his election. During his first year, Sir Lister donated funds to exempt Lichfield from market tolls and to help establish a market house. Once elected, he attended Parliament regularly and voted against the Whigs. Due to shifting trends in local politics, the 1747 election in Lichfield was described as "one of the roughest of the eighteenth century," with Sir Lister being an "old-style Tory swimming against a changing electoral tide". Outspent, he failed to win re-election, losing by 35 votes. The other Lichfield Tory MP also lost the election.

During the Jacobite rising of 1745, Sir Lister was a supporter of the Hanoverians led by King George II. The St James's Evening Post reported that he sent 250 horses from his Aston estate to aid the Duke of Cumberland's forces on their march north to Chester. His reported zeal for the cause was so great that he included his own carriage horses in the December 1745 event. However, Holte's true sympathies may have lain with Jacobitism; he equivocated on the subject. After his electoral defeat in 1747, Lister accompanied his supporters to a Jacobite demonstration at Lichfield Races. Dressed in plaid and wearing white roses made of ribbon, they sang Jacobite songs such as "Highland Laddie".

Lister did not enter politics again, but by 1767 he held the office of High Sheriff of Cheshire.

== Marriage and death ==
In October 1739, Lister married the Earl of Dartmouth's youngest daughter, Lady Anne Legge, whom he previously knew. She brought a dowry of £12,000 into the marriage but died the following year of smallpox, an event that brought great grief to him and her family. After his first wife's death, he married Mary Harpur, youngest daughter of Sir John Harpur, 4th Baronet. She was well-connected; a local newspaper described her as a "lady of great fortune, and possessed of all the valuable accomplishments that adorn her sex". She had a dowry of £10,000 and was expected to inherit an additional £2,000 upon the death of her mother. Mary died suddenly in July 1752 of an apoplexy.

Sir Lister married for a third time on 30 June 1755 to Sarah Newton. She was the younger daughter of Samuel Newton, a prominent landowner and slaveholder on the Caribbean island of Barbados. Sarah was unusually old for her first marriage, being thirty-two years old. She had a dowry of £2,000, a much smaller sum than his first two marriages. However, her brother was childless and it seemed increasingly possible that she and her two sisters would inherit their family's expanding wealth. They had known each other for years and her family supported him during his 1741 election. In 1763, the English artist Tilly Kettle completed separate portraits of the couple.

A later family historian, who was perhaps shaped by bias, would characterise Sarah as the controlling one in their relationship, noting that she was "haughty, cold and selfish". Charles also struggled to live within his financial means, angering his brother and providing another source of friction. A rift soon developed between the brothers and their wives. By 1769, Lister's health was failing and they sought health treatments in Bath. But upon their return to Aston Hall the following year, he was "far advanced in a dropsy, his legs, thighs and every surface of his body greatly swelled and distended with water". He pursued treatments with his doctors for three weeks before ultimately dying on 21 April 1770. None of his marriages produced any children, and his baronetcy was inherited by his brother.

== Will and legacy ==
In Lister's will, described by the local historian William Hutton as "one of the most unaccountable assignments that ever resulted from human weakness," he left his widow the ownership of Aston Hall for life and most of his other possessions, as well as increasing her annuity to £1,500 a year. The will also disinherited his niece, Mary Elizabeth Holte, by dictating that she would be passed over in favor of his first wife's relatives. Only in the absence of their male children would Mary inherit the property. Sir Charles and his wife blamed Sarah and her family for influencing the terms of the will and sued in court to overturn it; by 1775 the case was settled in Sarah's favour.

In 1783, Sarah and her sister Elizabeth inherited their family's estates in Barbados, becoming the owners of 430 enslaved people and controlling a fortune of £37,495. Sarah died on 1 April 1794 at the age of seventy. Her sister Elizabeth commissioned Richard Westmacott to build a monument for Sarah and Sir Lister at the Church of SS Peter & Paul near Aston Hall "as a memorial of his virtues, and in compliance with the wishes of his Widow". As Sir Charles died twelve years before Sarah, he never resided at Aston Hall as its owner. The residence was inherited by Heneage Legge, as dictated in Lister's will. The family baronetcy went extinct. Today, two streets in Duddeston bear the name of Lister.

Baronetage of England
Preceded by Clobery Holte	Baronet (of Aston Hall); 1729–1770	Succeeded by Charles Holte
