= Sarah Florry =

British businessman (1744 - 1832)

- Born: 1744; County Meath
- Died: 15 April 1832 (aged 87–88); Five Ways, Birmingham
- Occupation: businessperson

Sarah Florry (1744 – 15 April 1832) was a Birmingham businessperson. She dealt in metals from the age of 25 for forty years. She kept a diary which is of interest to historians.

== Life ==
Florry was born in County Meath in 1744. Her parents were Mary and John Florry and her father was an ironmaster. She came to Birmingham with her family as a child and she lived in the city for the rest of her life. She had three siblings but they did not survive to be adults.

Florry's family had a business in Birmingham until 1769 when they decided to stop trading and move out of the city. Her father moved to ?? where he again set up a new ironmaster business. She was the daughter who had never married and was therefore of legal age by English law at the age of 25. In the same year, she opened her own company.

She bought up metal for utility cartridges and sold it to the city's metal industry, a trade that was among the most lucrative at a time when the city was developing into one of Britain's industrial centers. As it was against social etiquette for a woman to deal with the mostly male players in the iron trade herself, she employed men who did this as middlemen, and from 1773 was in partnership with one of them a traveller named William Walker. The company was known as Mssrs Florry & Walker. Wiskin has noted that there was some hesitation in dealing with women, but not where they were established in business. Florry would borrow £100s of pounds for business purposes.

Florry became so wealthy that in 1798 she was able to sell her part of the company to Walker and then live a comfortable life for the rest of her life on the money she earned. She said she was enjoying the "comforts of ease and affluence". The plan was that she and her mother would move in with the widow of Sir Charles Holte, 6th Baronet. However Lady Holte and her mother died in 1799. She moved instead to the fashionable area of Edgbaston.

She left £4,000 mostly to women friends and she has left a diary, which has been the subject of research and is considered an important contemporary source. Florry died at her home in Five Ways in Edgbaston. Her diary is the subject of academic interest.
