= Holte baronets =

Extinct baronetcy in the Baronetage of England

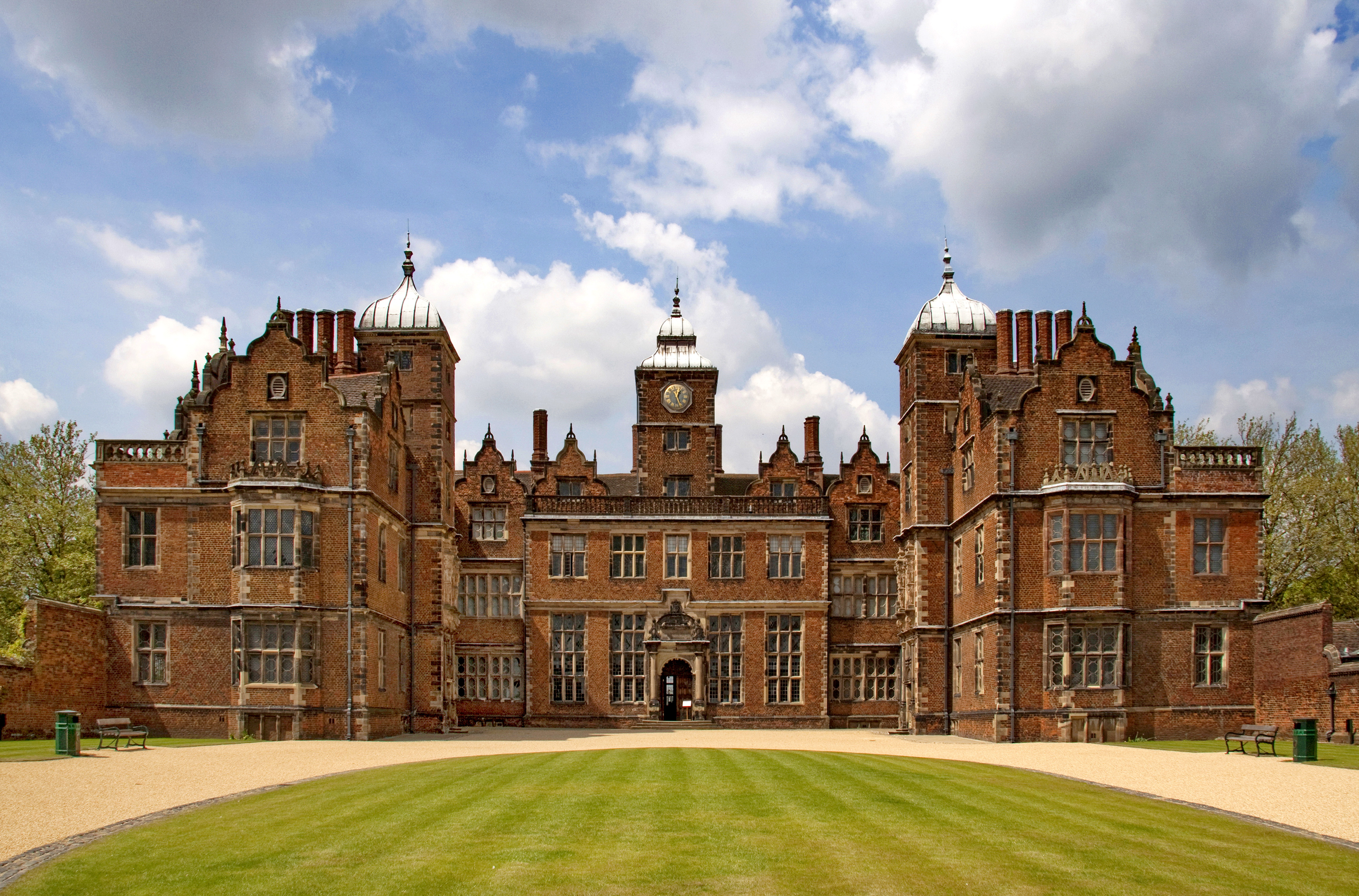
Aston Hall, the seat of the Holte family

The Holte Baronetcy, of Aston in the County of Warwick, was a title in the Baronetage of England. It was created on 25 November 1611 for Sir Thomas Holte, of Aston Hall, then in Warwickshire. He was High Sheriff of Warwickshire in 1599 and had been knighted by King James I in 1603. He was succeeded by his grandson, the second Baronet. He was Member of Parliament for Warwickshire. The third and sixth Baronets also represented Warwickshire in Parliament while the fifth Baronet was Member of Parliament for Lichfield. The title became extinct on the death of the sixth Baronet in 1782 and the substantial estate was broken up, under an Act of Parliament of 1817, in order to meet the interests of the various claimants.

Edward Holte, the father of the first Baronet, was High Sheriff of Warwickshire in 1583.

== Holte baronets, of Aston (1611) ==
- Sir Thomas Holte, 1st Baronet (1571–1654)
- Sir Robert Holte, 2nd Baronet (1625–1679)
- Sir Charles Holte, 3rd Baronet (1649–1722)
- Sir Clobery Holte, 4th Baronet (1682–1729)
- Sir Lister Holte, 5th Baronet (1720–1770)
- Sir Charles Holte, 6th Baronet (1721–1782)

== See also ==
- Holt baronets
- Holte (surname)

Baronetage of England
Preceded by Wyvill baronets	Holte baronets 25 November 1611	Succeeded by Grimston baronets
