= Industrial heritage of Barbados =

The industrial heritage of Barbados, an island nation in the Caribbean, is exemplified by a number of specific structures still standing.

Notable historical industrial buildings of Barbados include:

- Codrington College - A college that was first used as a sugar plantation. Built around ancient Amerindian archaeological sites, including burials.
- Morgan Lewis Windmill
- St Nicholas Abbey - One of only three extant Jacobean-style structures in the Western Hemisphere. Drax Hall Estate, another of the three examples, is also located in Barbados.
- Newton Slave Burial Ground - The remains of nearly 600 slaves were found on the grounds of the former Newton Plantation, in use from 1670–1833, at a cemetery consisting of low mounds.

== World Heritage Status ==
This collection of sites was added to the UNESCO World Heritage Tentative List on January 18, 2005, in the cultural category.
