= Thomas Holte =

English landowner (c. 1571–1654)

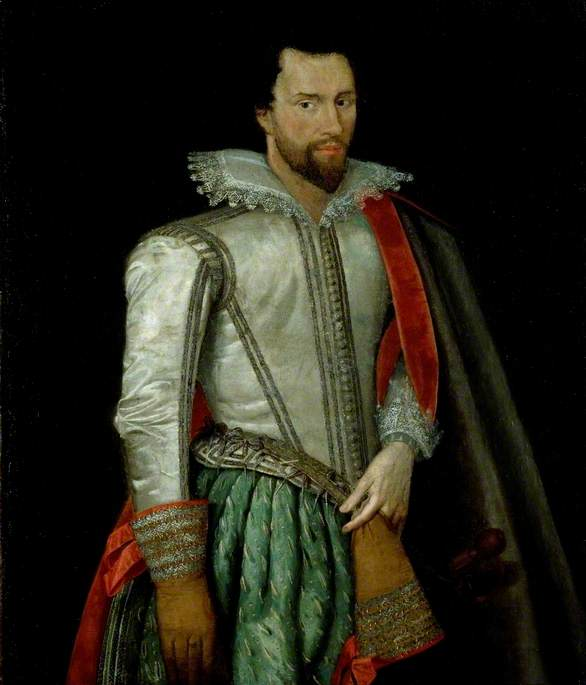
Thomas Holte

Sir Thomas Holte, 1st Baronet (c. 1571 – 14 December 1654) was an English landowner, responsible for building Aston Hall, in the parish of Aston in Warwickshire. The "Holte End" stand of Villa Park, the stadium of Aston Villa Football Club, sits on land originally part of the Aston Hall gardens and is named after Thomas Holte. The area also has a Holte School and Holte Road.

== Biography ==
He was born the son of Edward Holte of the Manor House, Duddeston, Warwickshire by his wife Dorothy Ferrars. The Holtes were a wealthy, land-owning family of some importance in Warwickshire. Their ancestors had owned land in the area for several hundred years and it had been considerably added to with the acquisition of monastic land during the Reformation. The Holtes served as High Sheriff of Warwickshire, Justices of the Peace and Deputy Lieutenants for the county. They had influential friends and relatives both locally and in London. His father died when Thomas was only 21, and as his successor, Thomas did much to further the family's fortunes.

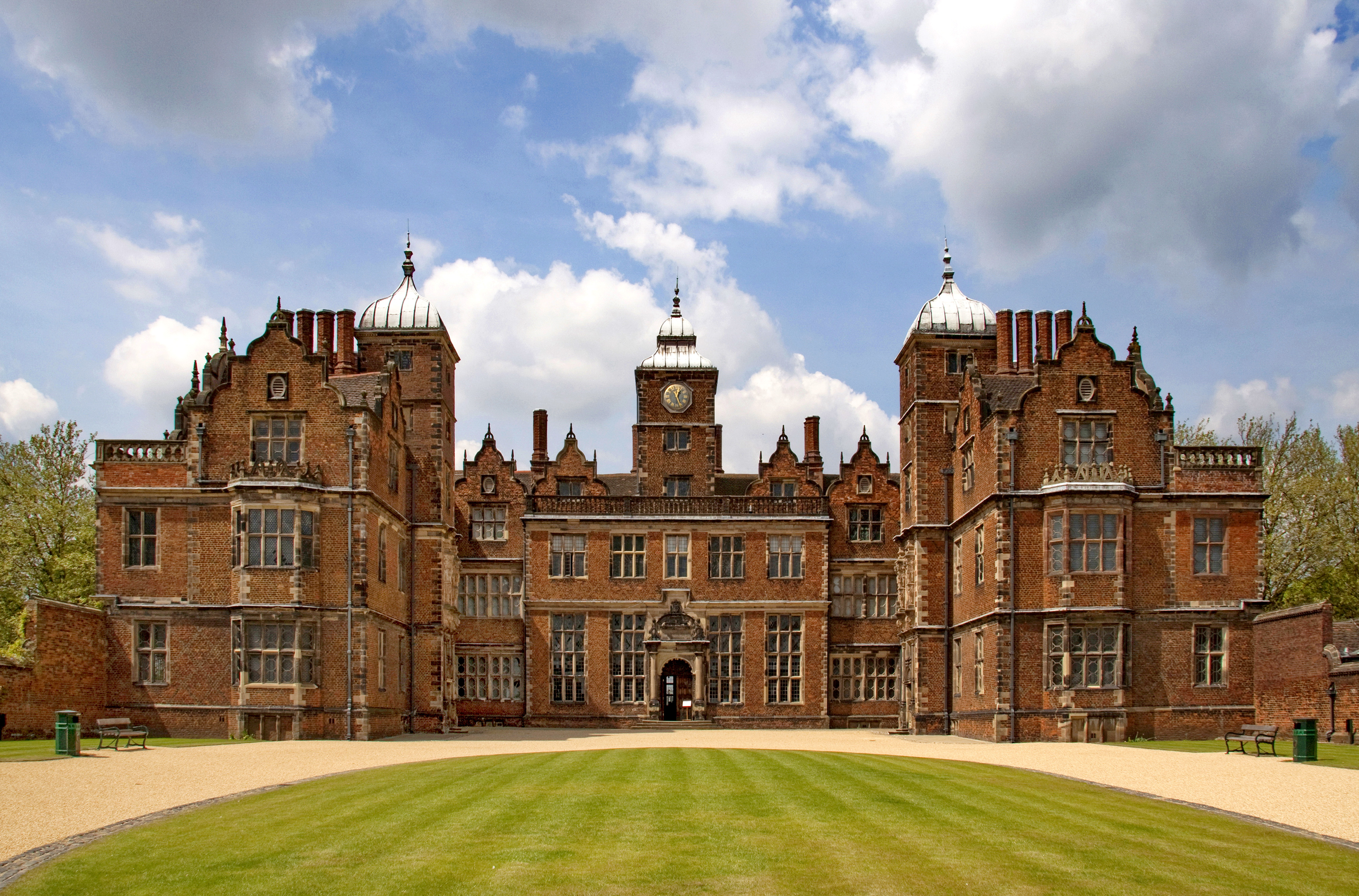
Aston Hall, built by Sir Thomas Holte, 1st Baronet

In 1599 he himself served as High Sheriff of Warwickshire. He received a knighthood in 1603 from James I as the King made his way from Scotland to London to claim his throne. In 1612 Sir Thomas was able to buy the title of baronet (James I sold these new titles in order to raise money to quell trouble in Ireland), being the first of the Holte Baronets. Sir Thomas now outranked all the local families and felt a grander home should be built to reflect both his wealth and status. The result of this desire was Aston Hall which he started building in 1618 and moved into in 1631. On 18 October 1642 King Charles I stayed the night at Aston Hall on his way to London. On his way to London he came across the Parliamentary Forces and the Battle of Edgehill was fought on 23 October. In December 1643, during the English Civil War, Sir Thomas requested the Hall be garrisoned by troops from Dudley Castle. Forty musketeers were sent by Colonel Leveson to protect Aston Hall but shortly after their arrival, they had to defend the hall against a 1200-strong force of Parliamentary soldiers sent from Coventry and local militia from Birmingham.

== Marriages and children ==
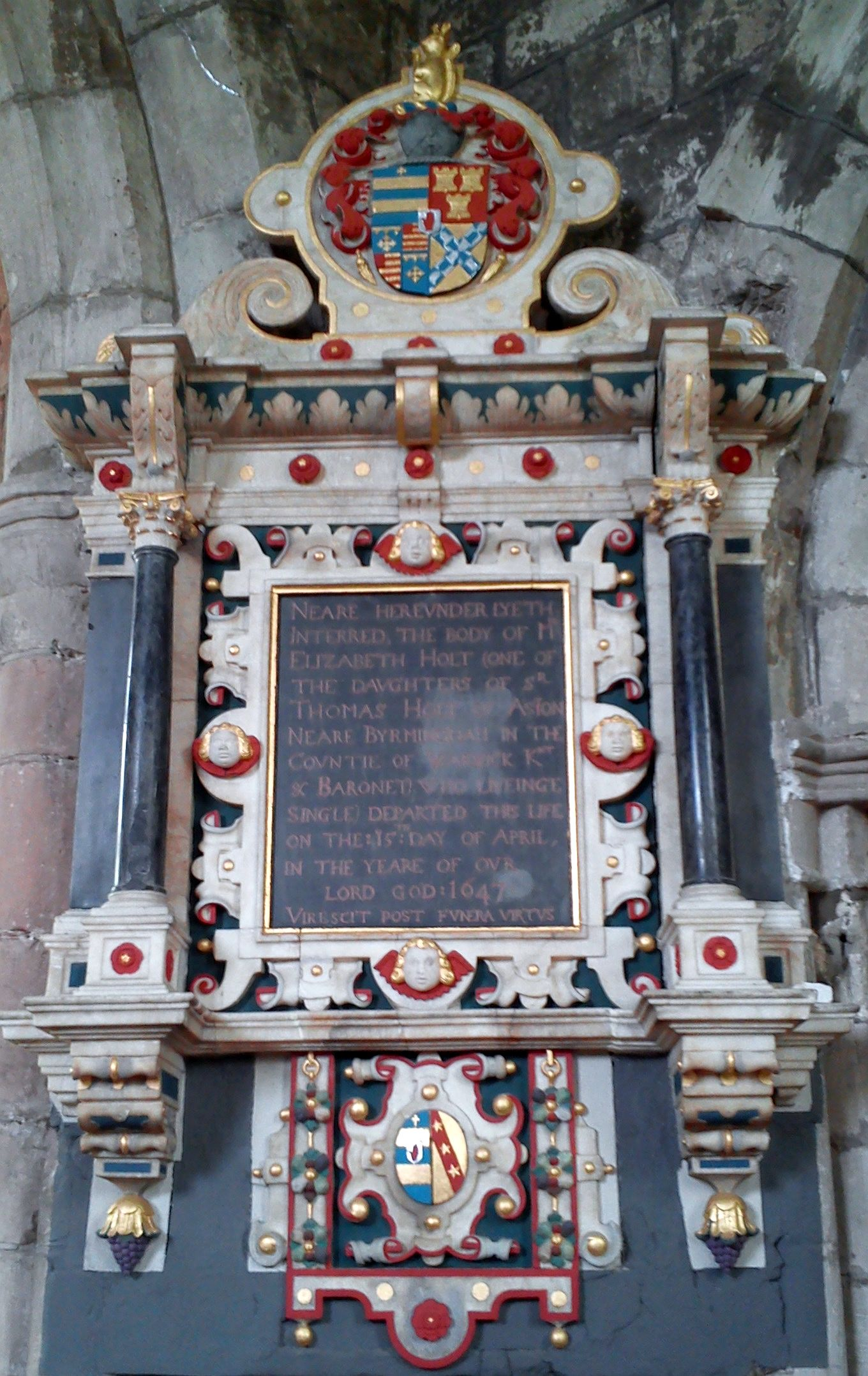
Monument in St Cassian's Church, Chaddesley Corbett, Worcestershire, to Elizabeth Holte (d.1647), unmarried daughter of Sir Thomas Holte, 1st Baronet

He married twice:

- Firstly to Grace Bradbourne (died 1627), a daughter and co-heiress of William Bradbourne of Hough, Derbyshire, by whom he had fifteen children, most of whom died young. His surviving children included:
  - George Holte (d.1641), eldest son and heir apparent, who predeceased his father;
  - Edward Holte (d.1643), second son, who predeceased his father. His father secured for him a position in the household of King Charles I. Whilst in London Edward met and married Elizabeth King, daughter of John King, Bishop of London, by his wife Joan Freeman. Sir Thomas did not give his permission for the marriage, and never forgave his son for proceeding regardless. Edward was entirely cut off from his inheritance, and despite pleas from the king himself, Sir Thomas never allowed reconciliation. After the death of his eldest brother George in 1641, Edward was his father's only surviving son. He died on military service in 1643, having never returned to the family fold despite his several attempts.
  - Grace Holte (d.1677), who married firstly Sir Richard Shuckburgh, by whom she had seven surviving children, including their eldest son Sir John Shuckburgh, 1st Baronet (1635–1661), and three daughters, Anne, Elizabeth and Grace; secondly she married Sir John Keating, Chief Justice of the Irish Common Pleas. She died in Dublin in 1677: her second husband erected a memorial to her in Palmerstown Church in Dublin.
  - Elizabeth Holte (d.1647), unmarried, to whom her father erected an elaborate monument in St Cassian's Church, Chaddesley Corbett, Worcestershire.
- Secondly he married Anne Littleton, the youngest daughter of Sir Edward Littleton, 1st Baronet of Pillaton Hall, Staffordshire, by his wife Hester Courten. He made great efforts to father another son, so that Edward could be permanently cut out of the estate. It was rumoured that Sir Thomas locked up a daughter because she refused to marry her father's choice of husband. The story goes that she starved to death. Many other stories were told of his violent rages: the best known, but probably untrue story was that he murdered his cook with a meat cleaver (or according to another version, with a roasting spit). Anne Littleton was able to give him another son, but the boy did not survive past childhood, in common with nine of the children from Sir Thomas' first marriage. Anne Littleton survived him and remarried to Charles Leigh, younger son of Thomas Leigh, 1st Baron Leigh.

== Death and burial ==
During his last days, he was finally persuaded to bequeath Aston Hall and all his estates to his grandson Robert Holte, Edwards's son, who inherited the baronetcy. Sir Thomas was buried in Aston Church, survived only by his wife Anne Littleton and his daughter Grace.

Baronetage of England
New creation	Baronet (of Aston); 1611–1654	Succeeded by Robert Holte
