= Dolly Newton =

18th century enslaved woman in Barbados

Dolly "Old" Doll Newton was an elite enslaved woman on the Newton Plantation in Barbados. Doll was the matriarch of her family and achieved a high status among her fellow enslaved and petitioned many times for freedom as a result of her elite status. She was born into slavery during the mid-18th century on the Newton Plantation.

== Early life ==
Not much is known about the early life of Dolly. Dolly was established as the matriarch of her family, and as the head of her family she managed their affairs. Karl Watson notes that she and her family had "a kind of right to be idle", which meant they did not have the same duties as others enslaved on the plantation. Her family was known to enjoy more comfort then the other enslaved people on the plantation and regularly held events for others on the plantation. They also had a love-hate relationship that reflected individual plantation communities.

== Life on the plantation ==
Life on the plantation was difficult and that is reflected in the Newton Slave burial ground in Barbados. The archeological evidence found in the burial ground shows that there was "... a gendering of health, wealth and energy on sugar plantations. The majority of field slaves were women and the majority of women worked in the field." Typically female and male slaves were put to work on the land and this is reflected in the archaeological evidence.

Dolly's life can be understood better by looking at the typical life of enslaved women on plantations in Barbados in the Caribbean. Slavery on Caribbean plantations consisted of many different types of work with women in the fields and in the household. The amount of work and labor needed far exceeded the white population in Barbados, and as a result, some enslaved people were able to advance their station within the community. The demand for labor created a unique situation in the Caribbean where, "a number of enterprising women of color actively used their connections with white men and women to their advantage—in effect negotiating their circumstances in order to achieve some semblance of freedom".

== Family dynamics/relationships ==
She was the daughter of Mary Hylas, and she and her sister, Mary Ann, functioned as the head of the family after their mother's death. Her mother, Mary Hylas, was a figure in the case of abolition and marriage when her husband, John Hylas, tried to sue to get her back, and the judge decided Mary belonged to her owner and was forced to go back to Barbados, where she gave birth to Doll and her sister.

Doll had three daughters; Dolly, Elizabeth, and Jenny. She also had two sons, Hercules and Hylas. We mainly know of her daughter Elizabeth, who achieved freedom later on in her life. Her daughter Dolly also achieved freedom in 1810 three months before Old Doll's death.

== Late life and death ==
Old Doll's later life was consumed with trying to free her daughters and she succeeded by 1810. After seeing her daughters to freedom she died three months later.

== Sources ==
- Watson, Karl "A kind of right to be idle: Old Doll, matriarch of the Newton Plantation. "Department of History, UWI / Barbados Museum and Historical Society, Barbados 2000.
- Roberts, Justin. "The 'Better Sort' and the 'Poorer Sort': Wealth Inequalities, Family Formation and the Economy of Energy on British Caribbean Sugar Plantations, 1750-1800." Slavery & abolition 35, no. 3 (2014): 458–473.
- Miles, D. M. (2010). Resisting in Their Own Way: Black Women and Resistance in the British Caribbean [Master's thesis, Ohio State University]. OhioLINK Electronic Theses and Dissertations Center.
- Paugh, K. (2014). "The Curious Case of Mary Hylas: Wives, Slaves and the Limits of British Abolitionism. Slavery & Abolition," 35(4), 629–651. https://doi.org/10.1080/0144039X.2014.929814
