= Newton Slave Burial Ground =

Heritage site in Barbados

Coordinates: 13.08713°N 59.53379°W

Newton Slave Burial Ground is an industrial heritage site and informal cemetery in Barbados. It was used by people enslaved at the adjacent Newton Plantation. The site has been owned by the Barbados Museum & Historical Society since 1993. It has been subject to excavations since the 1970s, which have produced information regarding slave lifeways including resistance, health, and culture.

== History ==
Officially colonized by the British in 1627, Barbados was by the end of the seventeenth century the richest possession of Britain's Caribbean empire. The Bajan economy was driven by, and dependent on, slave labor, which played out on cash-crop plantations throughout the island. One such site was the Newton Plantation, roughly 9.2 km (5.7 mi) east of the port of Bridgetown in the parish of Christ Church. The adjacent Newton Slave Burial Ground became the final resting place of over 570 African, Afro-Caribbean, and Afro-Bajan persons enslaved there from c. 1670-1833. Established by Derbyshire native Samuel Newton in the 1660s, the plantation grew sugarcane and produced rum and molasses, and its height of production coincided with Barbados' prominence in the British empirical economy during the seventeenth century. The plantation held slaves at least as recently as 1828, six years before slavery was abolished on the island in 1834.

Until the last quarter of the 17th century, the Newton Plantation was a major source of Maroon communities on the island. Increasingly draconian preventative tactics were implemented at the site to dissuade potential escapees, including slaves being branded with an "N" to indicate their status as property of the Newton Plantation. Slaves continued to escape in spite of these measures, settling in Barbados and acquiring fraudulent documents attesting to their freedom or escaping the island completely. Barbados was subject to such an extreme influx of slaves, though, that the plantation's authority did not always invest in pursuing escapees, and even manumitted elderly slaves no longer able to work in the cane fields. Indeed, people of African descent made up three-quarters of the island's population by 1700, and enslaved Black Africans made up between 70 and 90 percent of migration to the island between 1670 and 1720.

== Excavation ==
The site was initially excavated in the 1970s by American archaeologists Drs. Jerome Handler and Frederick Lange, who worked to elucidate colonial-era slave lifeways on Barbados. The Barbados Museum and Historical Society presides over the site's preservation.

Osteology has shed light on the quality of slave life and their cultural lifeways at the plantation. Examination of skeletal remains at the Newton burial ground suggests a life expectancy of 29 years, a figure in conflict with historical records indicating a life expectancy of 20 years. Despite the slightly longer lifespan, skeletal remains also yields evidence of periodic starvation among Newton's slave population. Moreover, osteological analysis suggests a low infant mortality rate, again in contrast with a historical demography that reports high rates of death among infants. Tooth analysis indicates slaves regularly smoked tobacco and exhibited incisor mutilations, the latter of which may have been a performative practice retained from the African continent or adopted by indigenous Caribbeans. Human remains at Newton were buried in a deliberate, non-arbitrary manner, possibly indicating the maintenance of systems of kinship among the site's slaves.

=== Retention of indigenous culture ===
Dated to the late 17th or early 18th centuries, archaeologists have been intrigued by the remains of a young adult woman enslaved at the site. The circumstances of her burial are abnormal, as she was interned in the largest artificial mound at the site without a coffin or other grave goods. Osteological analysis detected extremely high levels of lead in her body, which may have contributed to her death as she appears to have been otherwise healthy. The positioning of her body, too, is inconsistent with the rest of the remains at the burial ground, being the only person positioned face-down. This is characteristic of West African mortuary practices, and suggests that the slaves at Newton retained and maintained Indigenous cultural practices at the site.

== See also ==
- Dolly Newton elite enslaved woman on the Newton Plantation
