= Sir Charles Holte, 6th Baronet =

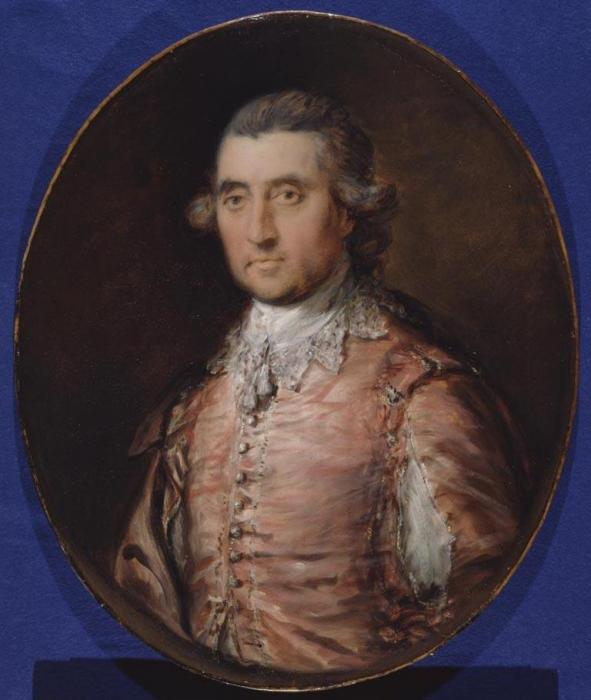
Sir Charles Holte, 6th Baronet, portrait by Thomas Gainsborough

Sir Charles Holte, 6th Baronet (bapt. 25 November 1721 – 13 March 1782) was a British politician who sat in the House of Commons from 1774 to 1780.

Holte was the second son of Sir Clobery Holte, 4th Baronet, of Aston Hall and his wife Barbara Lister, daughter of Thomas Lister of Whitfield, Northamptonshire. He was admitted at Magdalen College, Oxford on 13 February 1739, aged 17. In 1754 he married Anne Jesson, daughter of Pudsey Jesson of Langley, Warwickshire and had a daughter. He succeeded his brother Lister in the baronetcy on 21 April 1770.

In the 1774 general election he was returned after a contest as Member of Parliament for Warwickshire. His attendance in Parliament was not good as he suffered from poor health and he did not stand in 1780.

Holte died on 13 March 1782 and the baronetcy became extinct. The businessperson Sarah Florry and her mother intended to move in with his widow. The plan was abandoned when Sarah's mother and Lady Holte died in 1799.

== Sources ==
- Gainsborough, Thomas. "Birmingham Museums and Art Galleries - Portrait of Sir Charles Holte (1721-82)". bmagic.org.uk. Archived from the original on 23 February 2010.

Parliament of Great Britain
Preceded by Sir Charles Mordaunt, Bt; Thomas Skipwith, Bt	Member of Parliament for Warwickshire; 1774 general election–1780 With: Thomas Skipwith, Bt	Succeeded by Sir Robert Lawley, Bt; Sir George Shuckburgh, Bt
Baronetage of England
Preceded by Lister Holte	Baronet (of Aston Hall); 1769–1782	Extinct
