= Church of SS Peter & Paul, Aston =

St Peter & Paul, Aston juxta Birmingham
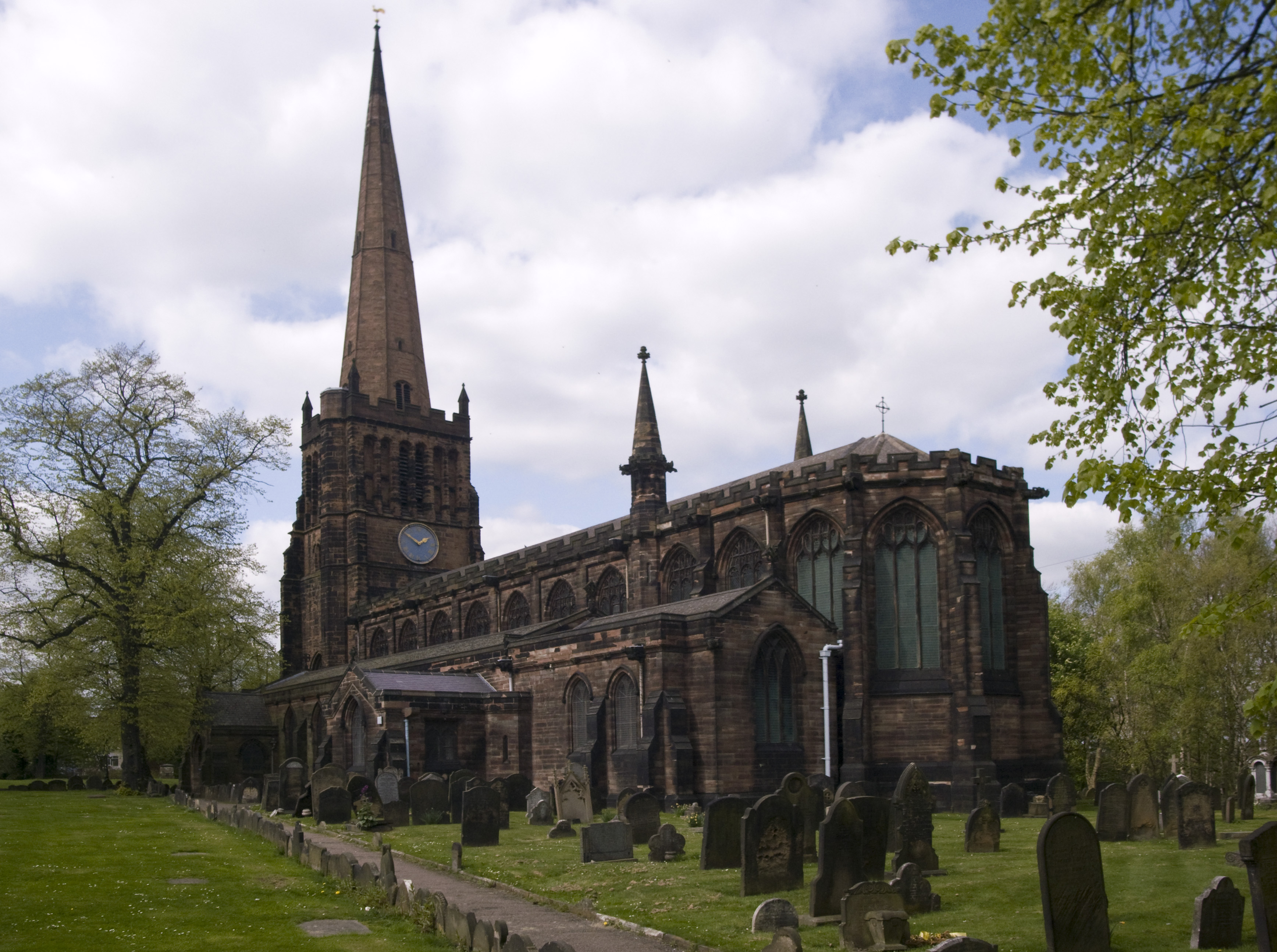
- St Peter & Paul, Aston juxta Birmingham
- 52°30′25″N 1°52′47″W
- OS grid reference: SP 08262 89910
- Denomination: Church of England
- Churchmanship: Evangelical
- Website: www.astonnechellscofe.org.uk

History
- Dedication: St Peter & St Paul

Specifications
- Height: 198 feet (60 m)

Administration
- Province: Canterbury
- Diocese: Birmingham
- Parish: Aston and Nechells

Clergy
- Vicar: Rev Dr Fiona Gregson
- Building details

Record height
- Tallest in Birmingham from 1838 to 1855^{[I]}
- Preceded by: Unknown, most likely a church
- Surpassed by: St Martin in the Bull Ring

General information
- Estimated completion: 1480

The Parish Church of St Peter and St Paul (grid reference SP082899) in Witton Lane, Aston, Birmingham, England, is a parish church in the Church of England.

== Background ==
The origin of Aston and its parish church is uncertain. A 2013 archaeological excavation on the site of the original village suggests there was a British Roman settlement. The Domesday surveyor (1086) gave Aston (Estone) 5 times the value of nearby Birmingham. Aston Hall was constructed in 1618. The area was wealthy during the agricultural era. It was overtaken by Birmingham's rising wealth from industrialisation. During the 19th century the area became residential and industrial. Generally the area prospered until the slum clearances in 1960s, the construction of the A38(M) motorway and the collapse of British industry in the last quarter of the 20th century. Aston is now one of the most deprived areas in the UK.

The church is in the Aston Hall and Church Conservation Area and is located between the A38(M) and Villa Park, home of Aston Villa Football Club. The building is grade II* listed.

== History ==
During the period of the Heptarchy, Aston was part of the Kingdom of Mercia, and documentary evidence from this period is scarce. The church was probably founded in the 9th century. The original building would have been wooden, and this was recorded in Domesday Book. The parish was extremely large. There were chapels of ease in Yardley, Water Orton and Castle Bromwich. It would have been impossible for these to be serviced by one priest, and it is likely that SS Peter & Paul was a minster church.

The first masonry structure was completed in 1120. It was the second largest church in the West Midlands (the original Coventry Cathedral being larger). There was a major reordering in 1480. The tower and spire remain from this church, although the spire was renovated by John Cheshire in 1776–1777).

The church was again reordered in 1879. The architect was J. A. Chatwin, a Birmingham architect who specialised in both neo-gothic and neo-classical styles. Minor changes have been made in more recent years: the most noticeable intervention was in 2008 when a masonry platform was constructed incorporating a unique cruciform immersion baptistry.

== Notable monuments ==
The church has many high quality monuments dating from 1360 to 2018. These include 3 chest tombs commemorating the Arden family who were ancestors of William Shakespeare. There is also a Shakespeare window.

Two tombs are associated with the Wars of the Roses. The effigy of William Harcourt (d. 1483) wears English armour. Sir Thomas de Erdington (d. 1449) is another fine memorial: Sir Thomas gave his name to the Erdington district of Birmingham.

There is a 19th-century bust commemorating John Rogers. Born in Aston in 1500 he was burnt at the stake in 1555. His crime was that he was responsible for the Matthew Bible, the first translation of the complete Bible from the original Greek into English. The King James is the best known edition of the Matthew Bible.

The most recent monument was installed in 2019 to commemorate the lives of Charlene Ellis (18), and Letisha Shakespeare (17) who were killed in a drive-by shooting in the early hours of 2 January 2003. The community was outraged, and led by the girls' mothers there is an ongoing crusade against gun and knife crime. The mosaic monument was originally installed at St George's School in Newtown and was moved to the church when the school closed. The community was involved in the construction of this monument.

The brass eagle lectern is a memorial to Joseph Ansell, founder of Ansells Brewery, who was churchwarden from 1867 to 1883. The memorial was manufactured by Jones and Willis, a notable Aston firm specialising in church furnishings.

There are some outstanding windows from the Victorian period. The recently renovated Plevins window in the south aisle depicts 4 episodes from the nativity story.

== Organ ==
The church had a 3 manual pipe organ. The original pipe organ was mounted in the tower of the 1480 church. It was replaced by the present organ that is located to the north of the chancel. The manufacturer was John Banfield & Son in 1891. It was rebuilt by Nicholson in 1967 with electric bellows and additional stops.

=== List of organists ===
- Henry Charles Heppenstall ca. 1852 - 1856
- Samuel Sparrow 1856 - 1868 (afterwards organist at St Stephen's Church, Redditch)
- Theophilus Barney ca. 1879 ca. 1881
- John Frederick Thomason, ca. 1885 - c. 1912
- Christopher Edmunds 1922 - 1957
- John Stratton ca. 1971

== Clock ==
The tower clock consists of an electric master clock installed in 1938 and four synchronous dials, one on the east face of the tower (the original dial), and a new one above the west porch inside the church, and new ones in each of the vestries. An electric motor provides the power for operating the Westminster chimes and striking mechanism. This clock was presented by Sir Frederick Smith to mark his golden wedding.

It replaced the previous timepiece which had failed in the early 1930s.

== Churchyard ==
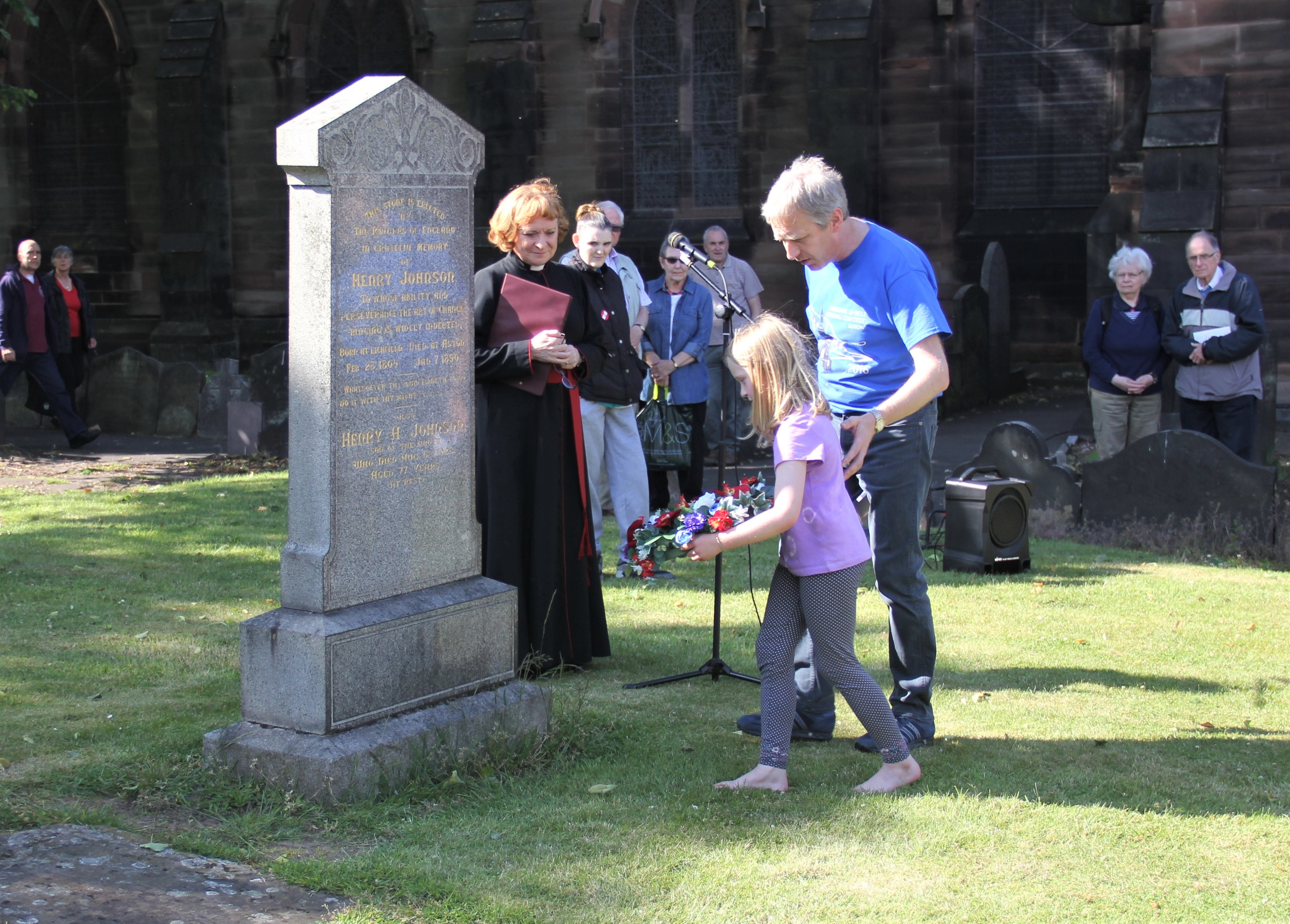
Henry Johnson memorial

The churchyard is closed to burials and maintenance is the responsibility of Birmingham City Council. It was partly cleared in the 1950s as a memorial to Rt Rev Henry McGowen a former vicar. Some parts are overgrown. Notable monuments are:

- 31 Commonwealth war grave memorials
- Alfred Wilcox VC (north of the church)
- The Ansell family vault, (north east of the church)
- Henry Johnson (1809–1890) (south of the church) was erected by the "Bell Ringers of England" to commemorate his work creating the Central Council of Church Bellringers
- The Aston War Memorial, dedicated as a peace memorial in 1921: a Grade II listed structure south west of the church

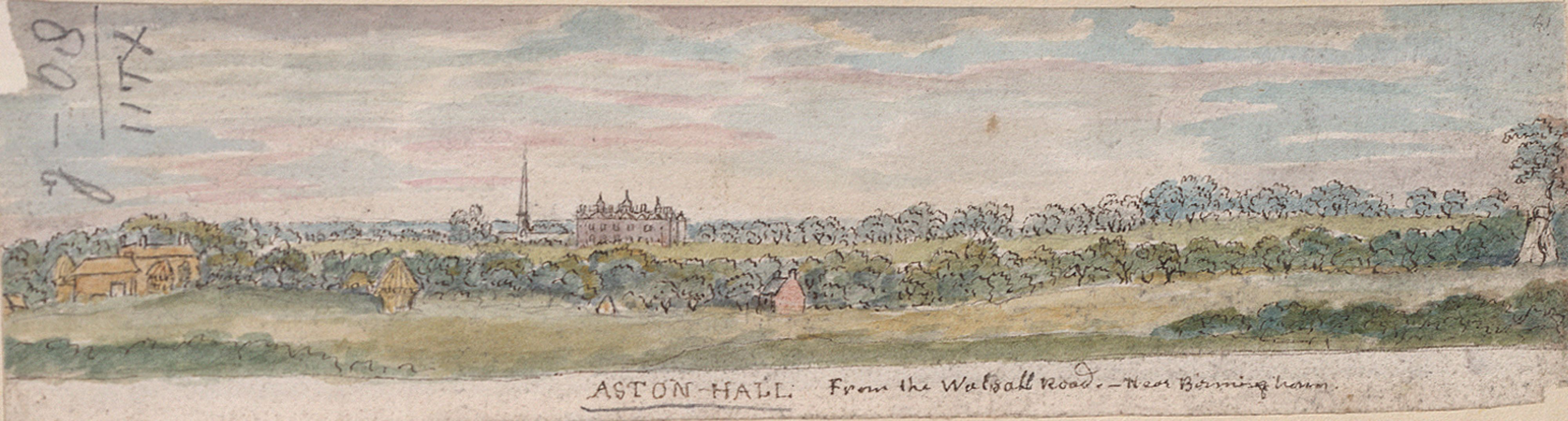
As can be seen in this 1775 watercolour by an unknown artist (now part of the British Library's King George III Topographical Collection), Aston Hall and the church were originally situated in open countryside.
