= Aston Hall =

Mansion in Birmingham, United Kingdom

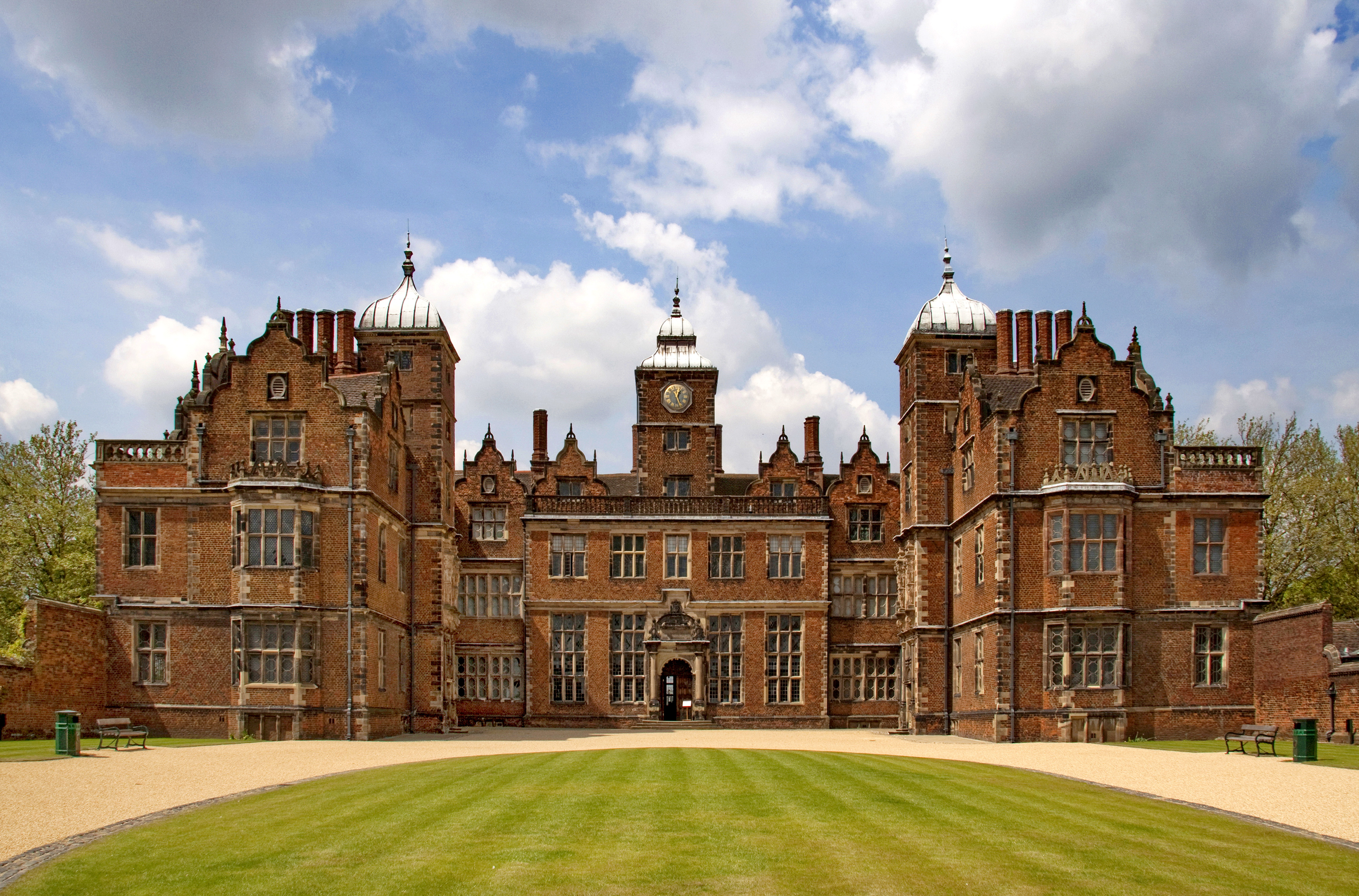

Quick reference
Location within West Midlands county
52°30′23″N 1°53′3″W
| Location | Aston, Birmingham, England |
History
| Built | April 1618-April 1635 |
Site notes
| Architect | John Thorpe |
| Architectural style | Jacobean |
| Owner | Birmingham City Council |
| Website | birminghammuseums.org.uk/aston |
Listed Building – Grade I
| Official name | Aston Hall |
| Designated | 25 April 1952 |
| Reference no. | 1219847 |
National Register of Historic Parks and Gardens
| Official name | Aston Hall |
| Designated | 1 July 1986 |
| Reference no. | 1001199 |

Aston Hall is a Grade I listed Jacobean house in Aston, Birmingham, England, designed by John Thorpe and built between 1618 and 1635. It is a leading example of the Jacobean prodigy house.

In 1864, the house was bought by Birmingham Corporation, the first historic country house to pass into municipal ownership, and is still owned by Birmingham City Council. It is now a community museum managed by the Birmingham Museums Trust and, following a major renovation completed in 2009, is open to the public.

== History ==
Using a design by John Thorpe, construction was commenced in April 1618 by Sir Thomas Holte, who finally moved into the hall in 1631. The house was completed in April 1635, and is now Grade I listed. It sits in a large park, part of which became Villa Park, the home ground of the Aston Villa football club. The park is listed Grade II in Historic England's Register of Parks and Gardens.

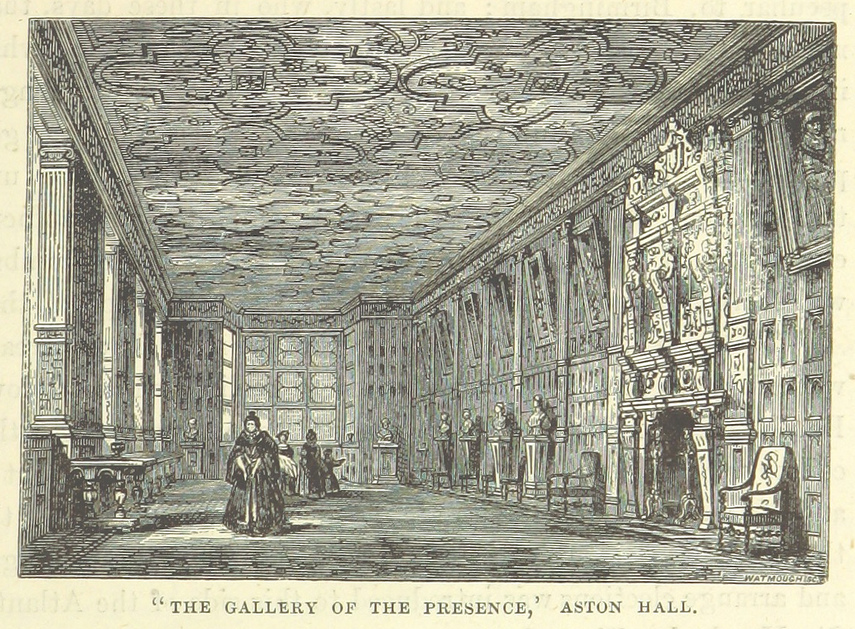
The Long Gallery

The house was severely damaged after an attack by Parliamentary troops in 1643. Some of the damage is still evident, and there is a hole in the staircase where a cannonball went through a window and an open door, and into the banister. The house remained in the Holte family until 1817, when it was sold and leased by James Watt Jr., son of industrial pioneer James Watt. The house was purchased in 1858 by a private company (the Aston Hall and Park Company Ltd) for use as a public park and museum. After the company ran into financial difficulties, the house was bought by the Birmingham Corporation in 1864, becoming the first historic country house to pass into municipal ownership.

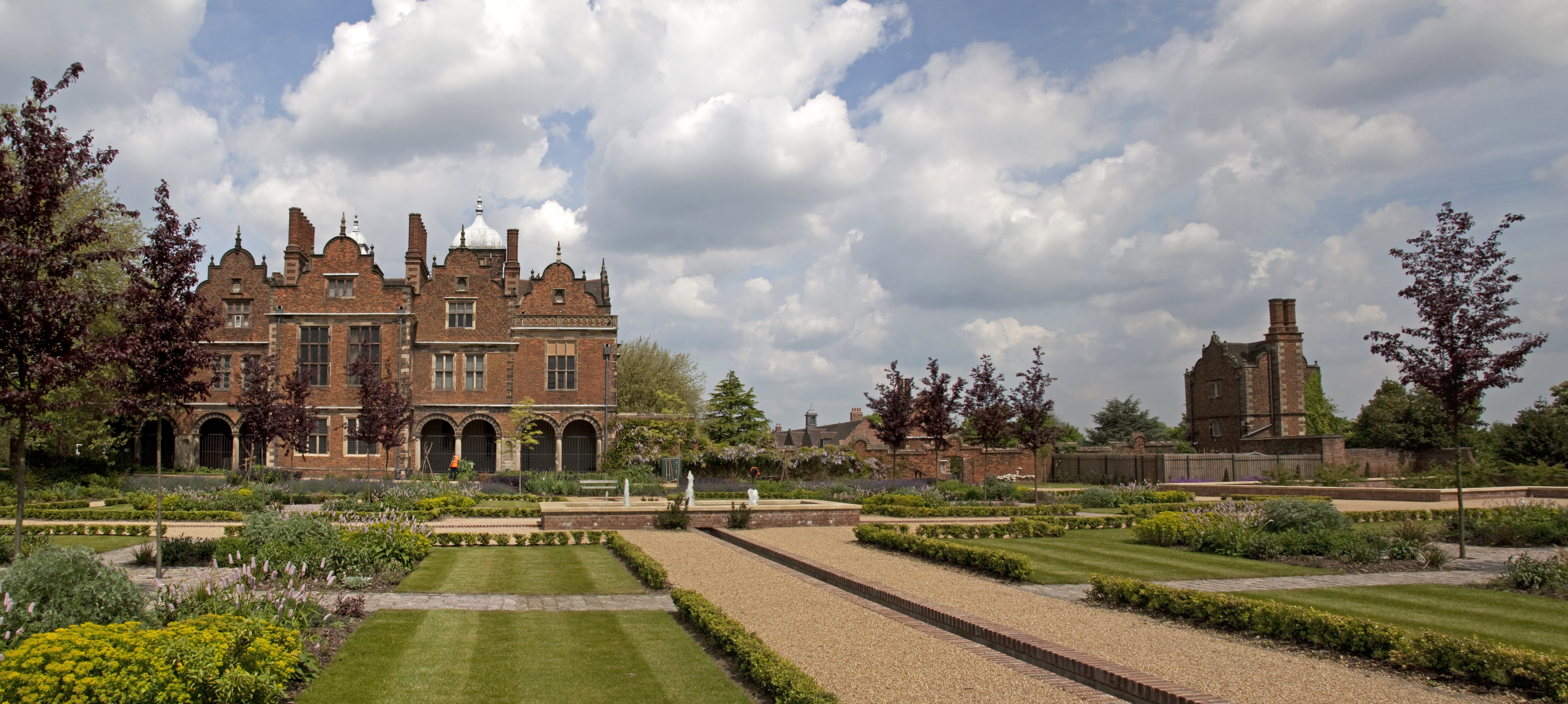
Aston Hall gardens

Aston Hall was visited by Washington Irving, who wrote about it as Bracebridge Hall, taking the name from Abraham Bracebridge, husband of the last member of the Holte family to live there. Irving's The Sketch Book stories described the harmonious warm-hearted English Christmas festivities he experienced while staying in Aston Hall, that had largely been abandoned. An Aston Hall custom the owners afforded the servants of the house on Christmas Eve appeared in The Gentleman's Magazine in 1795, which said: "the servants have full liberty to drink, dance, sing, and go to bed when they please."

For a few years from 1879, Birmingham's collections of art and the Museum of Arms were moved to Aston Hall after a fire damaged the municipal public library and Birmingham and Midland Institute, which shared a building in Paradise Street, until the building of the current Art Gallery in the Council House complex.

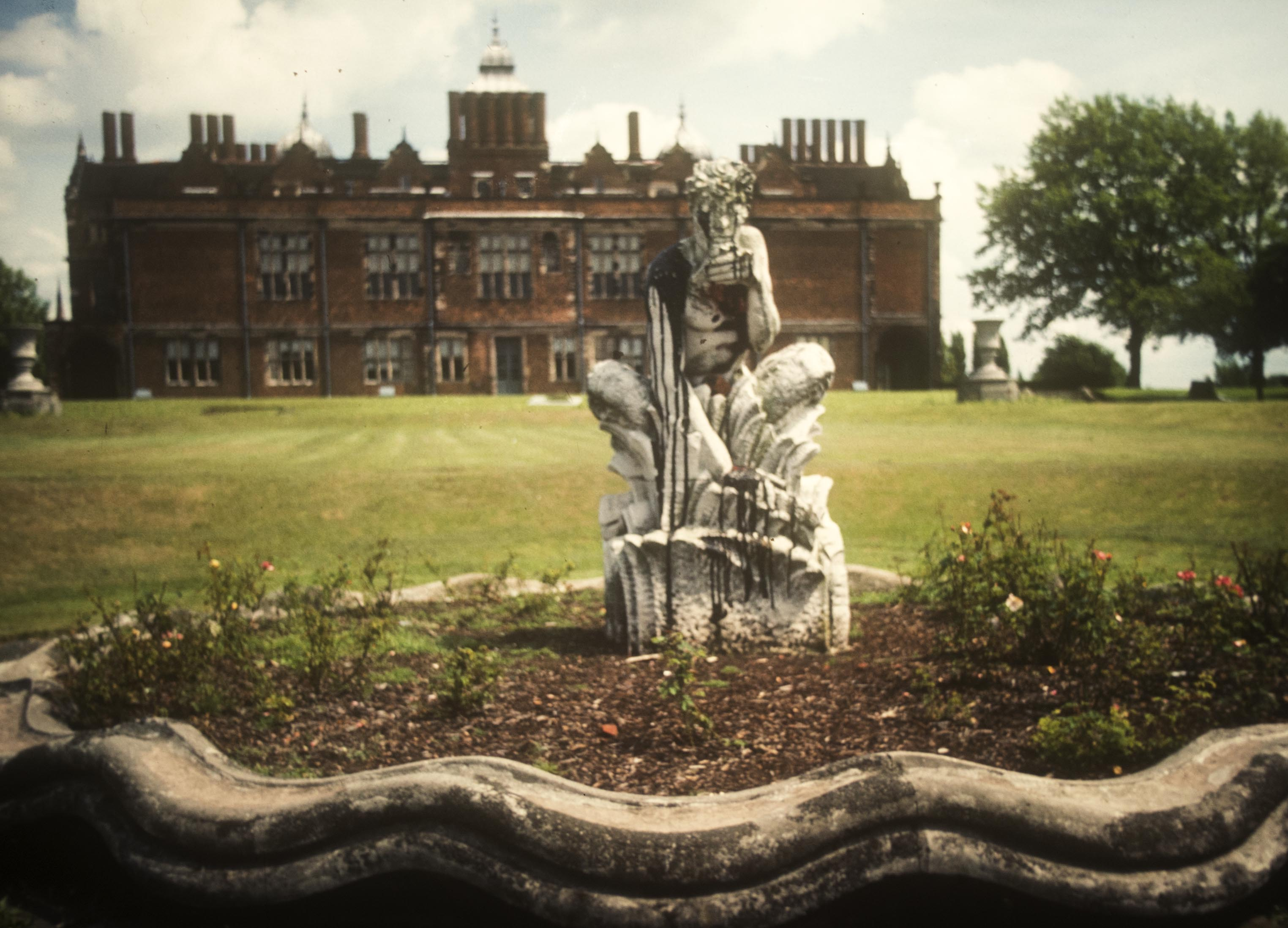
William Bloye's statue of Pan, in 1989

In the 1920s, the Birmingham Corporation was having financial troubles and had to choose between saving Aston Hall and the nearby Perry Hall. Aston Hall was saved, and in 1927, the Birmingham Civic Society designed formal gardens which were constructed by the city with a workforce recruited from the unemployed and paid for by government grants. The scheme included fountains, terracing and stone urns and a statue of Pan, by William Bloye, which the Civic Society paid for itself. In 1934 the finished work was presented to the City Parks Committee and unveiled by the Vice President of The Birmingham Civic Society, Gilbert Barling. As of January 2011, Birmingham City Council was working on the restoration of the statue, the head of which was missing. The council appealed for old photographs to assist in its reconstruction.

In 1938, the Pageant of Birmingham, with around 10,000 performers, was held in the grounds, to commemorate the centenary of Birmingham becoming a borough.

== Current status ==
Aston Hall is now a community museum managed by Birmingham Museums Trust, having previously been managed by Birmingham City Council until 2012. Aston Hall is open to the public during spring, summer and autumn months, following extensive renovation from 2006 to 2009. It boasts a series of period rooms which have furniture, paintings, textiles and metalwork from the collections of the Birmingham Museum & Art Gallery. Visible from the House less than 200 yards to the north is Aston Villa Football club stadium. The hall received 28,804 visitors in 2019.

The easternmost part of the grounds made way for the A38(M) motorway, also known as the Aston Expressway. This opened in 1972 and gave the city centre a direct link with the M6 motorway.

In October 2019, the mansion was named as the UK's top haunted heritage site, according to the Spectrum Paranormal Investigations and National Lottery.

In October 2023, Aston Hall became home to a parkrun, a free, weekly timed 5 km run which takes place every Saturday morning at 9am. The parkrun ceased running 10 months later in August 2024, however it is hoped this will restart again in the future.

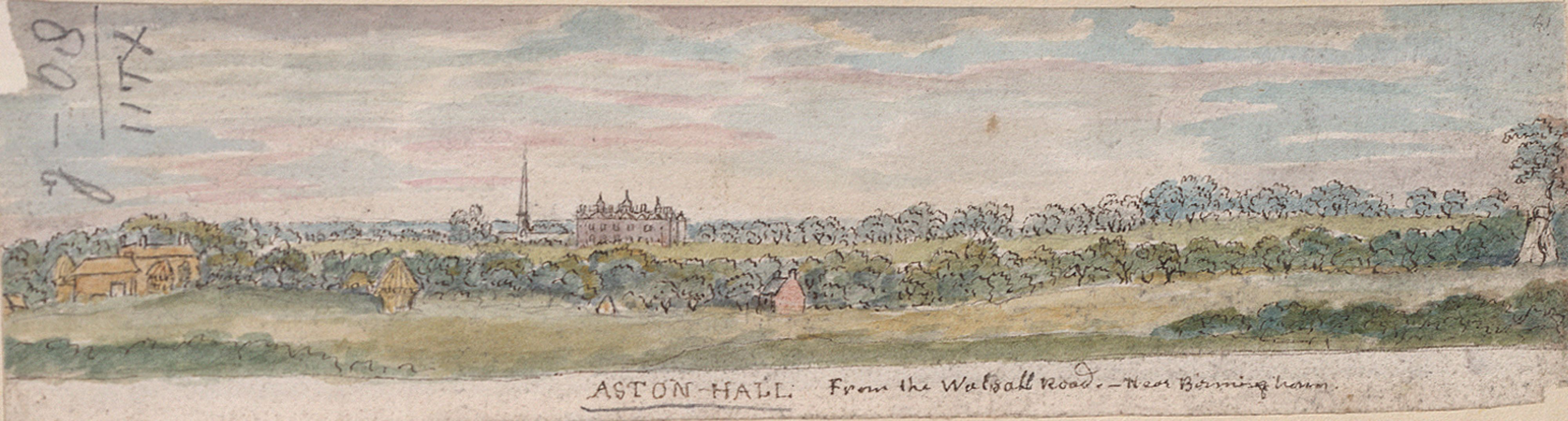
As can be seen in this 1775 watercolour by an unknown artist (now part of the British Library's King George III Topographical Collection), Aston Hall and the Church of SS Peter & Paul were originally situated in open countryside.
