= George Anson Starkweather =

George Anson Starkweather may refer to:

- George Anson Starkweather (New York politician) (1794–1879), United States Representative from New York
- George Anson Starkweather (Pennsylvania lawyer) (1821–1904), American lawyer, merchant, schoolteacher and local official in Pennsylvania
- George Anson Starkweather (Michigan businessman) (1826–1907), American merchant, schoolteacher, lawyer and member of the Michigan Legislature, nephew of the New York politician

== See also ==
- Starkweather (disambiguation)
- George Anson (disambiguation)
