= George Anson =

George Anson may refer to:

- George Anson, 1st Baron Anson (1697–1762), British admiral, noted for his circumnavigation of the globe
- George Anson (politician, born 1731) (1731–1789), British MP for Lichfield, nephew of the above
- Sir George Anson (British Army officer, born 1769) (1769–1849), British general and MP for Lichfield, son of the above
- George Anson (British Army officer, born 1797) (1797–1857), British general and MP for Great Yarmouth and Staffordshire South, nephew of the above
- George Edward Anson (1812–1849), British courtier and politician, first cousin of the above
- George Anson (priest) (1820–1898), Archdeacon of Manchester, first cousin of the above
- George W. Anson (1847–1920), British actor
- George Anson (doctor) (1850–1934), New Zealand cricketer and doctor

== See also ==
- Earl of Lichfield
- George Anson Starkweather (disambiguation)
