= Starkweather =

Starkweather may refer to:

== People ==
- Amelia Minerva Starkweather (1840–1926), American educator and author
- Charles Starkweather (1938–1959), spree killer in 1957–58
- David A. Starkweather (1802–1876), American politician and diplomat
- Gary Starkweather (1938–2019), American engineer and inventor
- George Anson Starkweather (Michigan businessman) (1826–1907), American merchant, teacher, and politician
- George Anson Starkweather (New York politician) (1794–1879), American politician
- George Anson Starkweather (Pennsylvania lawyer) (1821–1904), American lawyer, merchant, schoolteacher and public official
- Henry H. Starkweather (1826–1876), American politician
- John Amsden Starkweather (1925–2001), American clinical psychologist at University of California, San Francisco
- John Converse Starkweather (1829–1890), brigadier general in the Civil War and Washington, D.C., lawyer from Wisconsin
- Mary Ann Starkweather (1819–1897), American philanthropist
- Norris Garshom Starkweather (1818–1885), American architect; see Potter Building
- Samuel Starkweather (1799–1876), collector of the ports and mayor of Cleveland, Ohio

== Other ==
- Starkweather, North Dakota, United States
- Starkweather (band), an American hardcore / metal (metalcore) band
- Starkweather (film), a 2004 film based on Charles Starkweather
- Starkweather (comics), a comic series from Arcana Studio and Archaia Studios Press
