= Anson baronets =

Baronetcy in the Baronetage of the United Kingdom

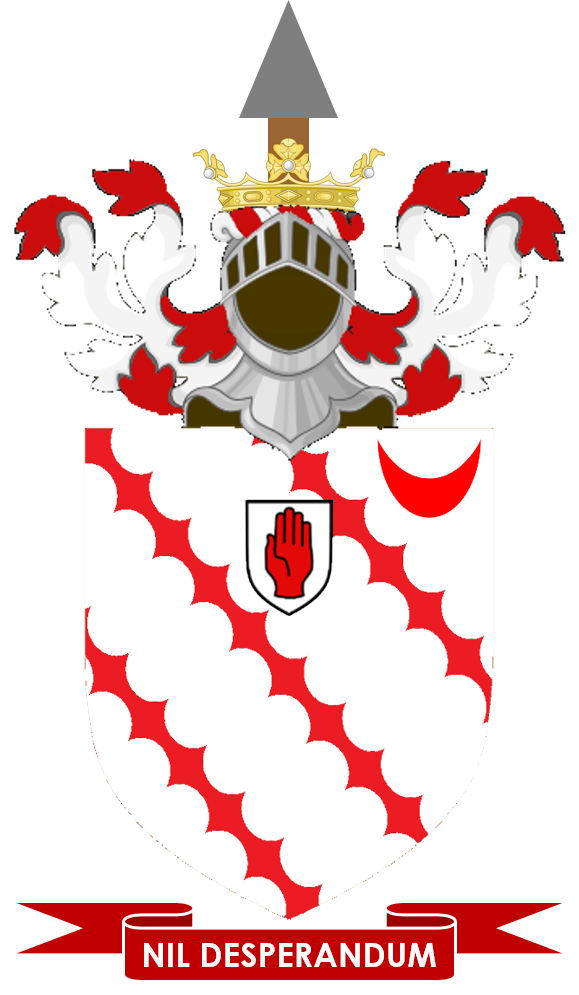
- Coat of arms of the Anson baronets of Birch Hall
- Creation date: 1831
- Status: extant
- Seat: Birch Hall
- Motto: Nil desperandum, Never despair
- Arms: Argent three Bendlets engrailed Gules in the sinister canton a Crescent of the second
- Crest: Out of a Ducal Coronet Or a Spear erect proper

The Anson baronetcy, of Birch Hall in the County Palatine of Lancaster, is a title in the Baronetage of the United Kingdom held by a branch of the Anson family.

The baronetcy was created on 30 September 1831 for William Anson. He was the third son of George Anson; his elder brothers were Thomas Anson, 1st Viscount Anson, and General Sir George Anson. Sir William was the uncle of Thomas Anson, 1st Earl of Lichfield, and Major-General George Anson and the great-nephew of George Anson, 1st Baron Anson (see Earl of Lichfield, 1831 creation, for more information on the Anson family). His grandson, the third Baronet, was a lawyer and Liberal Unionist politician. He never married and was succeeded by his nephew, the fourth Baronet. He was the only son of Frederick Arthur Anson, third son of the second Baronet. The fourth baronet drowned in the Thames on an outing of The Coterie in July 1914, after he jumped into the river encouraged by Lady Diana Manners. He had not married and on his death the title passed to his first cousin, the fifth Baronet, the eldest son of Rear-Admiral Algernon Horatio Anson (1854–1913), fourth and youngest son of the second Baronet. He was killed in action in the First World War. He was unmarried and was succeeded by his younger brother, the sixth Baronet. His elder son, the seventh baronet, was a Rear-Admiral in the Royal Navy. As of 2021 the title is held by the latter's son, the eighth Baronet, who succeeded in 2018.

== Anson baronets, of Birch Hall (1831) ==
- Sir William Anson, 1st Baronet (1772–1847)
- Sir John William Hamilton Anson, 2nd Baronet (1816–1873)
- Sir William Reynell Anson, 3rd Baronet (1843–1914)
- Sir Denis George William Anson, 4th Baronet (1888–1914)
- Sir John Henry Anson, 5th Baronet (1897–1918)
- Sir Edward Reynell Anson, 6th Baronet (1902–1951)
- Sir Peter Anson, 7th Baronet (1924–2018)
- Sir Philip Roland Anson, 8th Baronet (b. 1957)

The heir presumptive is the current holder's brother, Hugo William Anson (b. 1962). His heir apparent is his son Jack Jerome Anson (b. 2001).

== See also ==
- Anson family
- Earl of Lichfield (1831 creation)
- Major General Sir Edward Anson

Baronetage of the United Kingdom
Preceded by Greenhill-Russell baronets	Anson baronets of Birch Hall; 30 September 1831	Succeeded by Barrington baronets
