= General Anson =

General Anson may refer to:

- Edward Anson (1826–1925), British Army major general
- George Anson (British Army officer, born 1769) (1769–1849), British Army general
- George Anson (British Army officer, born 1797) (1797–1857), British major general
- Sir William Anson, 1st Baronet (1772–1847), British Army general
