= Talavera Vernon Anson =

Royal Navy Admiral (1809–1895)

Admiral Talavera Vernon Anson
- Born: 26 November 1809
- Died: September 8, 1895 (aged 85)
- Occupation: Royal Navy officer

Admiral Talavera Vernon Anson (26 November 1809 – 8 September 1895) was a Royal Navy officer from the Anson family. He took part in the Greek War of Independence and the First Opium War.

== Early life ==
Born in 1809, Anson was the second son of General Sir George Anson by his marriage to Frances Hamilton. A few months before his birth, his father had commanded a brigade at the Battle of Talavera. His uncles included Thomas Anson, 1st Viscount Anson, and General Sir William Anson. He had a sister, Mary Anne, who later married firstly Charles Gregory Okeover and secondly Robert Plumer Ward, a novelist. His younger brother Thomas Anchitel Anson (1818–1899) became a clergyman of the Church of England and a first class cricketer.

== Career ==
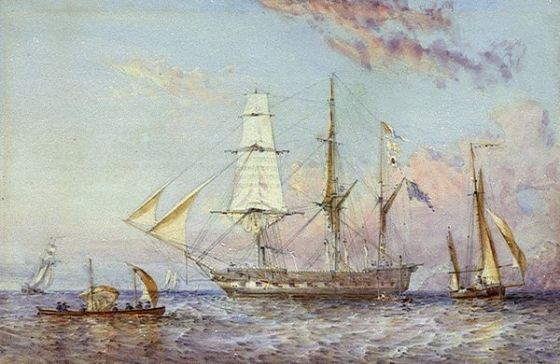
Rattlesnake, painted by Oswald Walters Brierly

Anson joined the Royal Navy on 16 June 1824, when he went aboard HMS Britomart, then under the command of his second cousin Captain Octavius Venables Vernon. He stayed with Vernon in Primrose, and went on to serve as a junior officer in Rattlesnake and Belvidera on the West India and Mediterranean stations. In his book The Navy in Transition, 1814–1864, Michael Lewis mentions Talavera Vernon Anson as "a peculiarly well-placed young man" and comments "What a name for an ambitious young officer in the first half of the nineteenth century!"

From 1827 to 1829 Anson kept the log of Rattlesnake, which for most of that time was cruising off the coasts of Greece, under the command of Charles Orlando Bridgeman, during the Greek War of Independence.

On 3 September 1831 Anson joined HMS Spartiate, in 1834 Blonde, and in 1837 Seringapatam. On 12 March 1833 he was promoted to Lieutenant and on 30 June 1838 to Commander. On 12 December 1839 he took command of HMS Pylades, an elderly eighteen gun sloop. He saw active service with her in China during the Opium War and took part in the Battle of Amoy. On 29 July 1840, under Anson's command, Pylades destroyed a "piratical junk" off the coast of China, an action which led to the distribution of bounty money. On 8 June 1841 he was promoted Captain. Returning to England in 1842, he took a long break from the sea, during which he got married. His next command was Euridice, an almost new 24-gun post ship, in 1846, after the death of his wife. Anson's final command, from 23 May 1856 to 23 April 1857, was James Watt, a 91-gun ship of the line.

Anson was promoted Rear-Admiral on the Reserved List (meaning half-pay) on 29 July 1861 and Vice-Admiral on the Reserved List on 6 April 1866. He retired on 20 October 1872 with the rank of admiral.

When he died in 1895 Anson was living at 7, College Crescent, St John's Wood. He left an estate valued at £320.

== Marriages and children ==
On 13 June 1843, Anson married Sarah Ann Potter, a daughter of Richard Potter, a Manchester merchant who had died the year before. She died on 5 May 1846. They had two sons.

On 24 August 1847, in Port Louis, Mauritius, Anson married secondly Caroline Octavia Emma Staveley, daughter of Major-General William Staveley, Commander British Forces in Hong Kong and with her had another four children.

In proceedings in the Court of Chancery in June 1873, Anson, as guardian of Mabel Alice, Maude, Ruth Isabel, Edith Mary, Ethel Blanche, Mercy Lilian, and Mary Beatrice Okeover, was one of the petitioners asking the Lord Chancellor to permit the sale of the Atlow estate in Derbyshire.
