= Charles Anson =

Charles Anson (born Adams; 1770 – 7 June 1827) was Archdeacon of Carlisle from 29 January 1805 until his death.

He was born in Stepney, the third son of George Adams (renamed Anson in 1773) of Sambrooke of Shugborough Hall, and Mary, the daughter of George Venables-Vernon, 1st Baron Vernon.

Anson was educated at Christ Church, Oxford. He was Rector of both Lyng (from 1794) and Mautby (from 1804) in Norfolk, having been presented to both livings by his elder brother Thomas Anson, 1st Viscount Anson before his appointment to the Archdeaconry by his uncle Edward Venables-Vernon-Harcourt, then Bishop of Carlisle. He died in Carlisle.

Church of England titles
Preceded by William Paley	Archdeacons of Carlisle; 1805 – 1827	Succeeded by William Goodenough
