= Peter Anson =

English non-fiction writer (1889–1975)

Anson in 1933.

Peter Frederick (Charles) Anson (22 August 1889 – 10 July 1975) was an English non-fiction writer on religious matters and architectural and maritime subjects. He spent time as an Anglican Benedictine monk before converting to Roman Catholicism.

== Biography ==
Peter Anson was born Frederick Charles Anson in Southsea on 22 August 1889, the son of Charles Eustace Anson (1858–1940), later a rear-admiral (son of Frederick Anson, Canon of Windsor and Caroline Maria, daughter of George Venables-Vernon, 5th Baron Vernon), and his wife, (Maria) Evelyn, née Ross (1863–1904). His brother was the electrical engineer Horatio St George Anson. He was educated at Wixenford School until the age of almost 15. His father's family had a history of prominence in the Anglican Church.

Anson converted to Roman Catholicism on 5 March 1913. In doing so, he followed the example of the members of the Anglican Benedictine monastery on Caldey Island (Ynys Bŷr), Pembrokeshire, Wales, under Aelred Carlyle, of which he had been one since 1910. He was received into the Third Order of the Franciscans in 1922, adopting the name Peter.

Anson was the author of some 40 books, many of them on religious subjects, and one of them a biography of Aelred Carlyle, who founded the first regular Anglican Community of Benedictines. He was also an accomplished artist.

In 1936, Anson moved to the north-east of Scotland, his mother's country of origin, living at Macduff, Banffshire from 1937 to 1952, and becoming involved in the early activities of Scottish nationalism. His acquaintance there included Neil M. Gunn and Compton Mackenzie.

== Selected bibliography ==
- The Catholic Church in Modern Scotland, 1560–1937. London: Burns, Oates & Washbourne. 1937. LCCN 38023161.
- The Benedictines of Caldey: The Story of the Anglican Benedictines of Caldey and Their Submission to the Catholic Church, with illustrations by the author. London: Burns, Oates & Washbourne. 1940. LCCN 40030835.
- Fishermen And Fishing Ways. London: Harrap. 1932.
- The Call of the Cloister: Religious Communities and Kindred Bodies in the Anglican Communion. London: Society for Promoting Christian Knowledge. 1956. LCCN 56000287.
- Abbot Extraordinary: A Memoir of Aelred Carlyle, Monk and Missionary, 1874–1955. London: Faith Press. 1958. LCCN 59017231.
- Fashions in Church Furnishings, 1840–1940. London: Faith Press. 1960. LCCN 60003044.
- Bishops at Large. London: Faber and Faber. 1964. LCCN 65005071.
- A Pilgrim Artist in Palestine. London: Alexander-Ouseley. nd. LCCN 32028915.
