= Charles Eustace Anson =

Royal Navy Admiral (1859–1940)

Admiral Charles Eustace Anson, CB, MVO (3 December 1859 – 28 April 1940) was a Royal Navy officer.

A member of the Anson family, Charles Eustace Anson was the son of the Rev Frederick Anson, Canon of Windsor, and of the Hon Caroline Maria, daughter of George John Venables-Vernon, 5th Baron Vernon. He entered HMS Britannia as a cadet in July 1872.

He was promoted to captain on 31 December 1901. Anson was the father of the electrical engineer Horatio St George Anson and the writer Peter Anson.
