= George Anson (politician, born 1731) =

British Whig politician and landowner

- Born: 25 July 1731
- Died: 27 October 1789 (aged 58)
- Occupation: Landowner
- Spouse: Mary Venables-Vernon
- Children: 8, including Thomas, George, Charles, William, Frederick

George Anson (25 July 1731 – 27 October 1789), known as George Adams until 1773, was a Staffordshire landowner from the Anson family and a British Whig politician who sat in the House of Commons between 1761 and 1769.

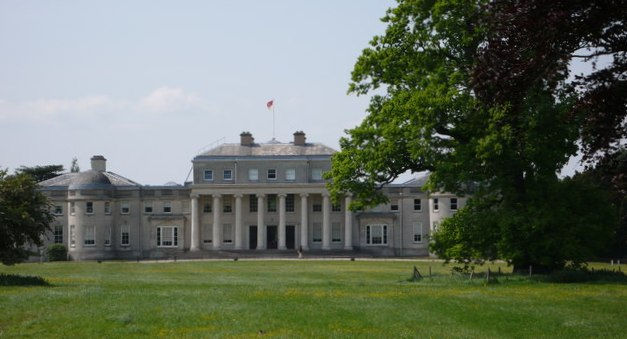
Shugborough Hall

== Background ==
Anson was the son of Sambrooke Adams and his wife Janette Anson, who was the daughter of William Anson and the sister of the naval commander Admiral George Anson, 1st Baron Anson, and the dilettante Thomas Anson.

== Public life ==
As George Adams, Anson was elected Member of Parliament for Saltash when his uncle died in 1761, a seat he held until 1768. He was returned to Parliament as one of two representatives for Lichfield in 1770, a seat he held until his death. In 1773, on the death of his uncle Thomas Anson he succeeded to the Anson estates, including the family seat of Shugborough Hall. He assumed by sign manual the surname and arms of Anson.

== Family ==
Anson married Mary Venables-Vernon, of Sudbury Hall, daughter of George Venables-Vernon, 1st Baron Vernon, in 1763. She was sister to Edward Venables-Vernon-Harcourt, Archbishop of York, and a descendant the Dukes of Norfolk. Anson died in October 1789, aged 58.

Several of their children gained distinction:

- Thomas Anson (1767–1818) was elevated to the peerage as Viscount Anson in 1806 and was the father of Thomas Anson, 1st Earl of Lichfield, and of Major-General George Anson
- Sir George Anson (1769–1849) was an army general and colonel of the 4th Dragoon Guards, Equerry to Victoria, Duchess of Kent, and Groom of the Bedchamber to Prince Albert. His son Talavera Vernon Anson joined the Royal Navy and became an admiral.
- Charles Anson (1770–1827) Archdeacon of Carlisle.
- Sir William Anson, 1st Baronet (1772–1847), was an army general who served in the Peninsular War and was created a baronet (see Anson Baronets) in 1831.
- Sambrooke Anson (1778–1846) became Lt-Colonel in command of the 1st Foot Guards throughout the Peninsula Campaign.
- Frederick Anson, D.D. (1779–1867), became Dean of Chester. He married Mary Anne Levett, daughter of Reverend Richard Levett of nearby Milford Hall, in 1807. Father of George Edward Anson and Frederick Anson.
- Mary Anson (died 1837) married in 1785 Sir Francis Ford, Bt., and died in 1837.
- Anne Anson (died 1822) married in 1792 Bell Lloyd of Crogan, younger brother to the Edward Lloyd, 1st Baron Mostyn, and was mother to William H. C. Lloyd, Archdeacon of Durban.

Parliament of Great Britain
Preceded by George Clinton; Charles Townshend	Member of Parliament for Saltash; 1761–1768; With: John Clevland 1761–63; Hon. Augustus Hervey 1763–68	Succeeded by Martin Hawke; Thomas Bradshaw
Preceded by Thomas Anson; Thomas Gilbert	Member of Parliament for Lichfield; 1770–1789; With: Thomas Gilbert	Succeeded by Thomas Gilbert; Thomas Anson
