= Hiram Walden =

American politician

Member of the U.S. House of Representatives from New York's 21st district
- In office March 4, 1849 – March 3, 1851
- Preceded by: George A. Starkweather
- Succeeded by: William W. Snow

Member of the New York State Assembly from Schoharie County
- In office January 1, 1836 – December 31, 1836 Serving with Alvin Wilkins
- Preceded by: John F. Hiller, Jonas Krum
- Succeeded by: Philip Mann, Reuben Merchant

Town Supervisor of Wright, New York
- In office 1846–1849
- Preceded by: None (position created)
- Succeeded by: Henry D. Rosekrans

Town Supervisor of Schoharie, New York
- In office 1842–1844
- Preceded by: John S. Brown
- Succeeded by: Daniel Larkin

Personal details
- Born: August 21, 1800 Pawlet, Vermont
- Died: July 21, 1880 (aged 79) Wright, New York
- Party: Democratic
- Spouse: Sophia Dominick (m. 1822-1880, his death)
- Children: 10
- Occupation: Businessman; Farmer

Military service
- Allegiance: United States; New York
- Branch/service: New York Militia
- Years of service: 1830s-1840s
- Rank: Major General
- Commands: 16th Division

Hiram Walden (August 21, 1800 – July 21, 1880) was an American businessman and politician from New York. He was most notable for his service as a United States representative from 1849 to 1851.

== Biography ==
Walden was born in Pawlet, Vermont on August 21, 1800. He attended the district schools of Pawlet and moved to Berne, New York in 1818. In 1821, he moved to the hamlet of Waldenville in what is now the town of Wright. Walden farmed and was involved in the manufacture of axes, a business he operated until it was destroyed in an 1846 fire.

He was a member of the New York State Assembly in 1836. In addition to his business interests, Walden was involved in the state militia and in 1839 he attained the rank of major general as commander of the 16th Division. He commanded the division until resigning in 1841. He was Schoharie's town supervisor from 1842 to 1844. When the town of Wright was created by separating it from Schoharie, Walden was Wright's first town supervisor, and he served from 1846 to 1849.

In 1848, Walden was the successful Democratic nominee for a seat in the United States House of Representatives. He served in the Thirty-first Congress (March 4, 1849 – March 3, 1851). During his House term, Walden was a member of the Committee on Invalid Pensions and chairman of the Committee on Patents. He was an unsuccessful candidate for re-nomination in 1850.

After leaving Congress, Walden was employed as an inspector in New York City's United States Custom House. After retiring, he was a resident of Waldenville until his death on July 21, 1880. He was buried at Berne and Beaverdam Cemetery (formerly Pine Grove) in Berne, New York.

== Family ==
In 1822, Walden married Sophia Dominick (1803-1893), daughter of John Dominick and Margaretha Ball. They were the parents of 10 children, of whom eight lived to adulthood.

Miner (b. 1823)
Hiram Jr. (b. 1828)
John D. (b. 1833)
Moses P. (b. 1835)
Albert D. (b. 1837)
Sylvanus (b. 1839)
Isaac D. (b. 1841)
Elmina Edna (b. 1844)

U.S. House of Representatives
| Preceded by George A. Starkweather | Member of the U.S. House of Representatives from New York's 21st congressional district 1849–1851 | Succeeded by William W. Snow |
