= Henry Wheatley =

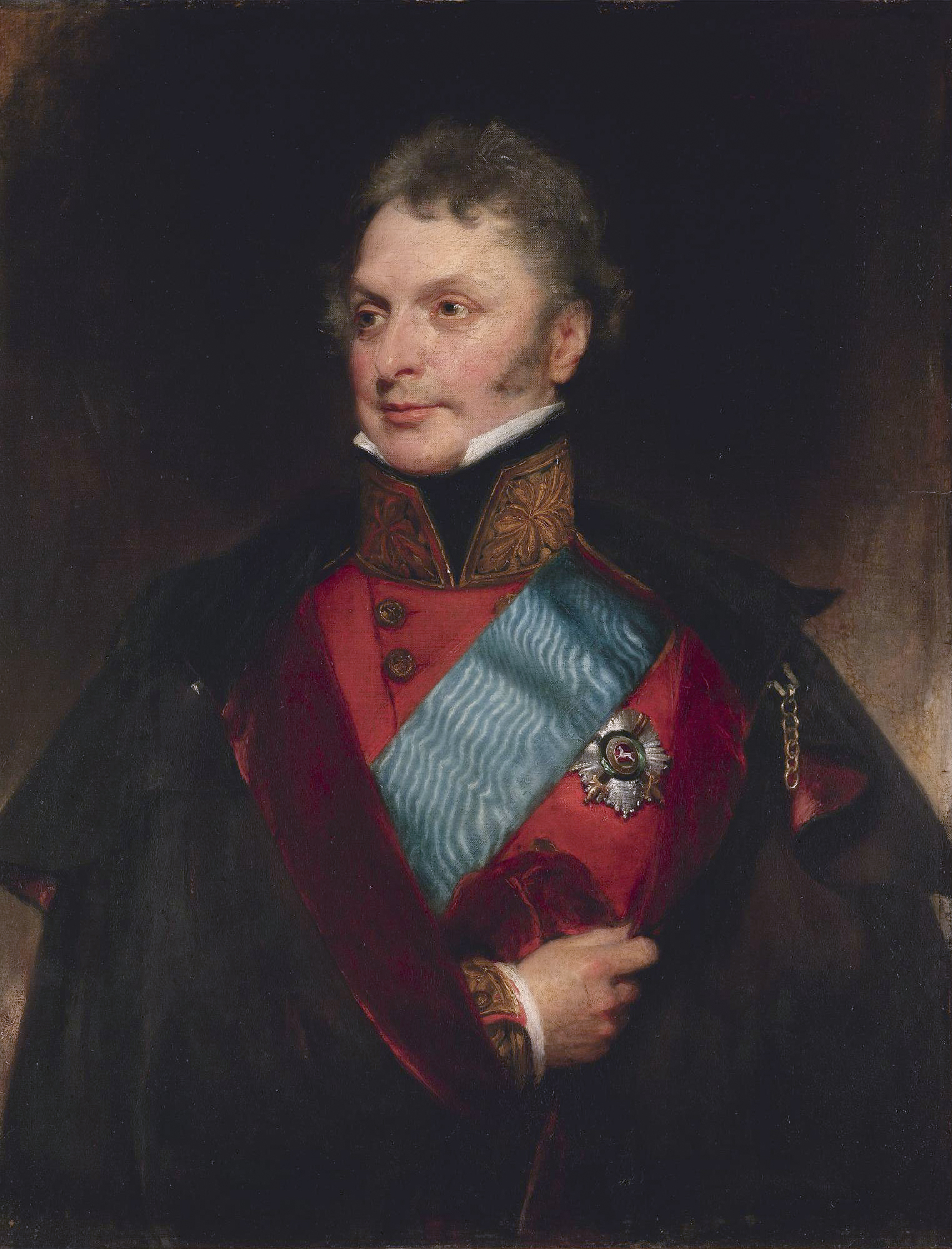
Major-General Sir Henry Wheatley (1777–1852) (Henry William Pickersgill)

Major-General Sir Henry Wheatley, 1st Baronet CB, GCH (1777 – 21 March 1852), was the Keeper of the Privy Purse for King William IV and Queen Victoria from 1830 to 1846.

== Life ==
He was the third son of William Wheatley, esq. of Lesney House, in the parish of Erith, Kent, where he was born in 1777, by Margaret, daughter of John Randall, esq. of Charlton, in the same county.

He entered the 1st Battalion of Grenadier Guards in 1795 and served in Holland under Prince Frederick, Duke of York and Albany, second son of George III. During this campaign, he was wounded in the neck on 19 September 1798. He was promoted from ensign to lieutenant that year.

In 1807, he served as aide-de-camp to Sir Harry Burrard during the Battle of Copenhagen. He was also present at the Battle of Vimeiro in 1808, was given a company in 1809, accompanied the Guards to Cádiz in 1810, and was engaged with that corps at Barrosa. He retired from the Army in 1812; his rank of major-general was in the Army of Hanover, and was conferred upon him by King William IV.

In 1830, William made him Keeper of the Privy Purse. He was also Receiver-General of the Duchy of Cornwall. Both of these offices remained with him upon the succession of Queen Victoria until his retirement in January 1847.

He was appointed Knight Commander of the Royal Guelphic Order and Knight Bachelor in 1831, promoted to Knight Grand Cross in 1834 and was created a baronet in February 1847, and nominated a Companion of the Order of the Bath of the civil division in 1848.

== Family ==
Wheatley married Louisa, daughter of George Edward Hawkins, serjeant surgeon to King George III on 13 February 1806. They had two sons who died young and five daughters: Georgiana-Louisa; Henrietta-Maria, who died young; Laura-Maria who died in 1841; Mary; and Sophia, Maid of Honour to Queen Adelaide. He died 21 March 1852 and his baronetcy expired with him.

Wheatley baronets
- Escutcheon of the Wheatley baronets
- Creation date: 1847
- Status: extinct
- Extinction date: 1852
- Seat: Hampton Court Green
- Motto: I trust in my God

Court offices
Preceded by Sir William Knighton, 1st Baronet	Keeper of the Privy Purse; 1830–1846	Succeeded by George Edward Anson
Baronetage of the United Kingdom
New creation	Baronet; 1847–1852	Extinct
