= Horatio Saint George Anson =

British electrical engineer

Horatio St George Anson (1 August 1903 – 30 June 1925) was a British electrical engineer who in collaboration with Stephen Oswald Pearson discovered the Pearson–Anson effect, inventing the neon lamp relaxation oscillator.

He was the son of Admiral Charles Eustace Anson, CB, MVO, Superintendent of the Royal Navy’s Chatham Dockyard (son of Frederick Anson, Canon of Windsor and Caroline Maria, dau. of George Venables-Vernon, 5th Baron Vernon) and Maria Evelyn, daughter of Horatio S. J. Ross. His brother was the writer Peter Anson. As a youth in the Royal Naval College, he developed an interest in research into radio. He subsequently joined Faraday House, the headquarters of the Institution of Electrical Engineers (now the Institution of Engineering and Technology), in London. There he discovered that the negative resistance of neon lamps could be exploited to create an electronic oscillator.

In 1924 he was appointed to the Research Department of the Royal Aircraft Establishment in Farnborough, Hampshire. He was immediately elected a fellow of the Physical Society of London. However, soon thereafter he died in a car accident.

== Publications ==
- S. O. Pearson and H. St. G. Anson, Demonstration of Some Electrical Properties of Neon-filled Lamps, Proceedings of the Physical Society of London, vol.34, no. 1 (December 1921), pp. 175–176 doi:10.1088/1478-7814/34/1/435
- S. O. Pearson and H. St. G. Anson, The Neon Tube as a Means of Producing Intermittent Currents, Proceedings of the Physical Society of London, vol. 34, no. 1 (December 1921), pp. 204–212 doi:10.1088/1478-7814/34/1/341
