= HMS Pylades (1824) =

Sloop of the Royal Navy

History

United Kingdom
- Name: HMS Plyades
- Builder: Woolwich Dockyard
- Launched: 29 June 1824
- Honours and awards: China 1839 - 42
- Fate: Broken up in 1845

General characteristics
- Tons burthen: 43137/94 (bm)
- Length: 90 ft 1 in (27.46 m)
- Beam: 30 ft 0 in (9.14 m)30ft
- Draught: 28 ft 2 in (8.59 m)
- Sail plan: Ship rig
- Armament: 2 × 9-pounder guns + 12 × 32-pounder carronades

HMS Pylades was an 18-gun sloop launched in 1824 and broken up in 1845.

Built at the Woolwich Dockyard and launched on 29 June 1824, she was armed with two 9-pounder guns and twelve 32-pounder carronades; she had a crew of 125 men.

Under the command of Talavera Vernon Anson, Pylades took part in the First Opium War and was present at the Battle of Amoy in 1841.

Pylades ran aground and capsized at Roona Point, County Mayo on 14 April 1831 but was later repaired. She was broken up in May 1845.
