= Frederick Anson =

British clergyman

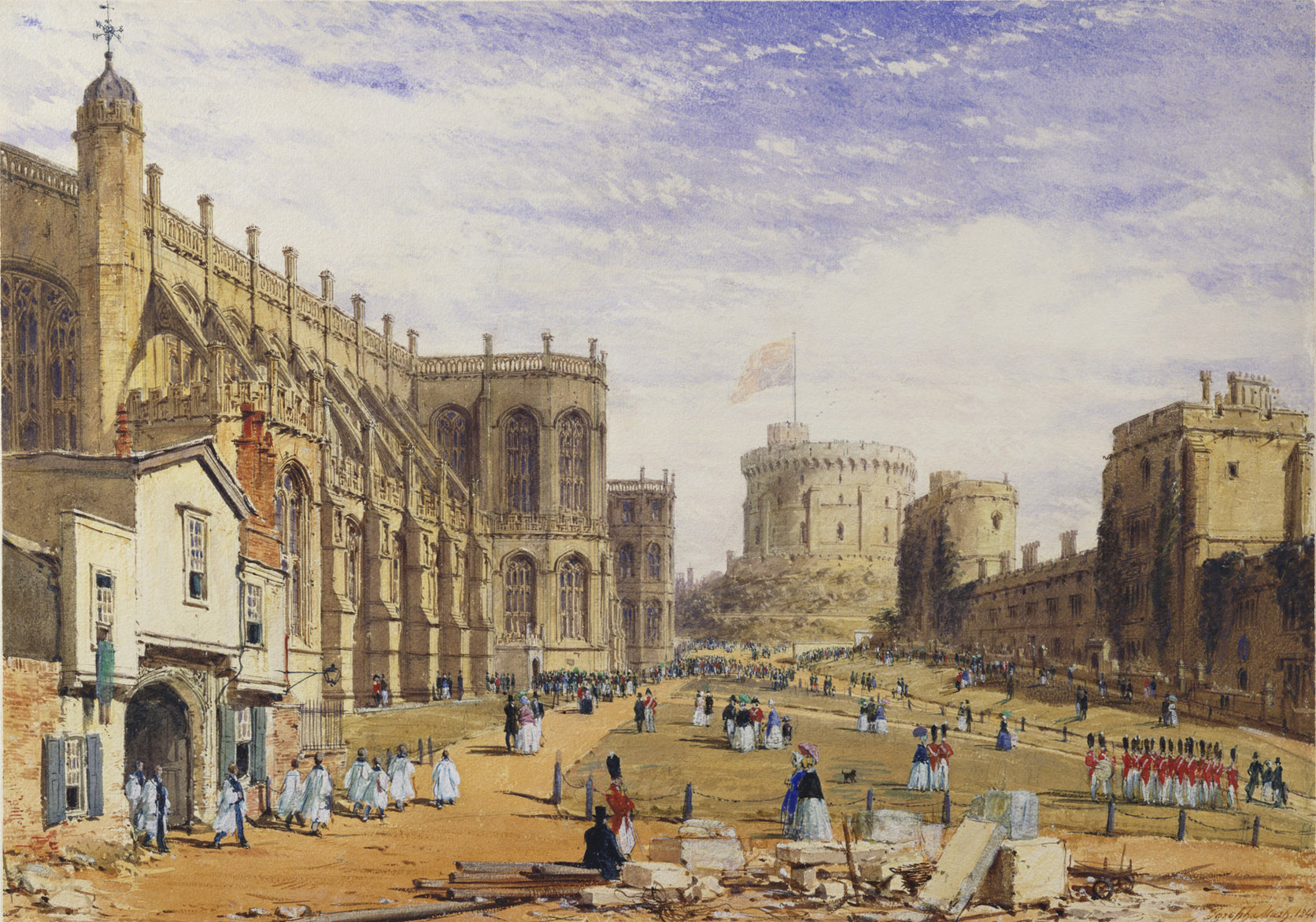
St George's Chapel at Windsor Castle, left, 1848.

Frederick Anson (1811–1885) was a British clergyman from the Anson family, who served as Canon of St George's Chapel, Windsor Castle.

== Early life and education ==
Anson was the son of Dean of Chester Frederick Anson (son of George Anson and Mary Vernon, daughter of George Venables-Vernon, 1st Baron Vernon) and Mary Anne, only daughter of Richard Levett (another priest) and Louisa Frances (Bagot) of Milford Hall, Staffordshire. His brother was George Edward Anson, Keeper of the Privy Purse to Queen Victoria, Treasurer of the Royal Household to Prince Albert, Treasurer and Cofferer of the Household of the Prince of Wales (later Edward VII), a member of the Council for the Duchy of Lancaster and the Prince of Wales's Council for the Duchy of Cornwall. George Edward Anson served as private secretary to Prince Albert for many years and was frequently employed on diplomatic missions for the royal family.

== Career ==
Anson was a fellow of All Souls College, Oxford. He was appointed a Canon of Windsor on 30 December 1844, by Queen Victoria; he also served as Rector of Sudbury, Derbyshire, the home of his wife's family.

== Personal life ==
Anson married to Caroline Maria, daughter of George John Venables-Vernon, 5th Baron Vernon of Sudbury Hall. Through his son Admiral Charles Eustace Anson, Anson was grandfather to the electrical engineer Horatio St George Anson and the writer Peter Anson. Anson's son Alfred William became an Episcopal priest in America, serving as Rector of Christ Episcopal Church in Martinsville, Virginia from 15 January 1894 until 1920.

Anson is memorialized at St George's Chapel in the font in the south aisle of the nave, fashioned in alabaster with a marble base.

== See also ==
- St. George’s Chapel, Windsor Castle, Shugborough, Thomas G. Burch
