= Thomas Anson (cricketer) =

English clergyman and cricketer

Personal information
- Full name: Thomas Anson
- Born: 14 October 1819; Westminster, England
- Died: 3 October 1899 (aged 79); Longford, England
- Batting: Right-handed

Domestic team information
- Years: Team
- 1839: Cambridge University

Career statistics
Competition	First-class
Matches	44
Runs scored	872
Batting average	12.28
100s/50s	0/1
Top score	72*
Catches/stumpings	29/19
- Source: CricketArchive, 15 August 2008

Thomas Anchitel Anson (14 October 1818 – 3 October 1899) was an English clergyman and cricketer from the Anson family. He played first-class cricket for Cambridge University from 1839 to 1842 and for Marylebone Cricket Club from 1839 to 1845.

Anson was the seventh son of General Sir George Anson and the younger brother of Talavera Vernon Anson. He was educated at Eton and Jesus College, Cambridge, where he was a cricketer and rower. He was awarded his cricket 'blue', in 1839 and was described as one of the best amateur wicketkeepers of his day. He also played for teams including Cambridge Town Club, England, Gentlemen, Gentlemen of England, Gentlemen of the South, Oxford and Cambridge Universities and Slow Bowlers. His highest score of 72 not out came when playing for Marylebone Cricket Club in a match against Oxford University in 1841. In the same year Anson rowed for the Cambridge Subscription Rooms crew that won the Grand Challenge Cup at Henley Royal Regatta.

Anson was ordained deacon (London) on 18 December 1842 and priest (Norwich) on 13 August 1843. He was curate of Mistley, Essex, from 1842 to 1843, rector of Billingford, Norfolk, from 1843 to 1850 and rector of Longford, Derbyshire from 1850 to 1899. He was rural dean from 1869 to 1899.

Anson died at the Longford rectory aged 80.

Anson married Ann Jane Packe, daughter of Lieutenant Colonel Henry Packe of Twyford Hall, Norfolk, on 5 August 1846.
