= William W. Snow =

American politician

Member of the U.S. House of Representatives from New York's 21st district
- In office March 4, 1851 – March 3, 1853
- Preceded by: Hiram Walden
- Succeeded by: Henry Bennett

Personal details
- Born: April 27, 1812 Heath, Massachusetts
- Died: September 3, 1886 (aged 74) Oneonta, New York
- Party: Democratic

William W. Snow (April 27, 1812 – September 3, 1886) was an American businessman and politician who served one term as a United States representative from New York from 1851 to 1853.

== Biography ==
Snow was born in Heath, Franklin County, Massachusetts on April 27, 1812. He attended the public schools before learning the trade of wool-carder and cloth dresser. He moved in 1841 to Oneonta, New York in 1831 and engaged in the wool-carding business. The following year entered the tin and hardware business and also engaged in agricultural pursuits.

=== Political career ===
He was member of the New York State Assembly (Otsego Co.) in 1844.

=== Congress ===
He was elected as a Democrat to the Thirty-second Congress (March 4, 1851 – March 3, 1853).

=== Politics after Congress ===
He was again a member of the New York State Assembly (Otsego Co., 2nd D.) in 1870.

He then served as supervisor of the town of Oneonta in 1873 and 1874.

=== Later career and death ===
He later served as State excise commissioner in 1877, then was member of the village board of trustees. He also engaged in banking.

Smith died in Oneonta, New York on September 3, 1886, and was interred in Riverside Cemetery.

U.S. House of Representatives
| Preceded by Hiram Walden | Member of the U.S. House of Representatives from New York's 21st congressional district 1851–1853 | Succeeded by Henry Bennett |
New York State Assembly
| Preceded by Clifford S. Arms | New York State Assembly; Ostego County, 2nd District; 1870 | Succeeded by J. Lee Tucker |
