= George Anson (priest) =

George Henry Greville Anson (20 February 1820, in Marylebone – 9 February 1898, in Winchester) was a clergyman and member of the Anson family. He was Rector of St James's, Birch-in-Rusholme and served as Archdeacon of Manchester from 30 May 1870 to 1890.

The son of Sir William Anson, 1st Baronet, he was educated at Eton College and Exeter College, Oxford and ordained in 1843. After a curacy at Leeds Parish Church he was, for many years, the incumbent at St James, Rusholme, retiring from the posts of Rector, and Archdeacon of Manchester, in 1890.

He married Augusta Agnes Hook on 27 June 1848.

Church of England titles
| Preceded by Richard Durnford | Archdeacon of Manchester; 1870–1890 | Succeeded by James Wilson |
