= Battle of Amoy =

1841 battle of the First Opium War

Coordinates: 24°27′28″N 118°4′24″E

- Part of the First Opium War
- The 18th (Royal Irish) Regiment of Foot storming Chinese fortifications during the battle
Date	26 August 1841
Location	Amoy, Fujian
Result	British victory

Belligerents
United Kingdom: British East India Company	Qing China

Commanders and leaders
Hugh Gough; William Parker	Unknown

Strength
15 ships 2,500 troops	26 junks 5,600–10,000 troops

Casualties and losses
2 killed 15 wounded	60+ killed 500 guns captured 26 junks captured

The Battle of Amoy was fought between British and Qing forces at Amoy (present-day Xiamen) on Xiamen Island, Fujian, in the Qing Empire on 26 August 1841 during the First Opium War. The British captured the forts at Xiamen and on nearby Gulangyu Island (formerly Kulangsu Island).

== Battle ==
Before the engagement, Qing forces prepared defenses along the shores of Xiamen and built batteries on Gulangyu Island. The British began the battle by bombarding the island's batteries for two to four hours (sources vary), with little effect. Land forces then disembarked their transports and took the batteries with little resistance. The day was noted as being very hot and fatiguing to the men. Qing forces withdrew and the city fell the next day. A garrison force of 550 men, mostly from the 18th, and three ships — the Druid, Pylades, and the Algerine— were left moored at Gulangyu to defend Xiamen.

Commander John Elliot Bingham (late first lieutenant of HMS Modeste) wrote a detailed first-hand account of the battle from a British perspective.

== British order of battle ==
	Officers	Enlisted men
Artillery	9	240
18th	30	648
26th	8	153
49th	24	460
55th	26	731
Madras Sappers	6	184
total	103	2416

Ships: Wellesley, 74; Blenheim, 74; Blonde, 44; Druid, 44; Modeste, 18; Cruizer, 18; Pylades, 18; Columbine, 16; Bentinck, 10; Algerine, 10; Sesostris, 4; Phlegethon, 4; Nemesis, 4; Queen, 4

== Gallery ==
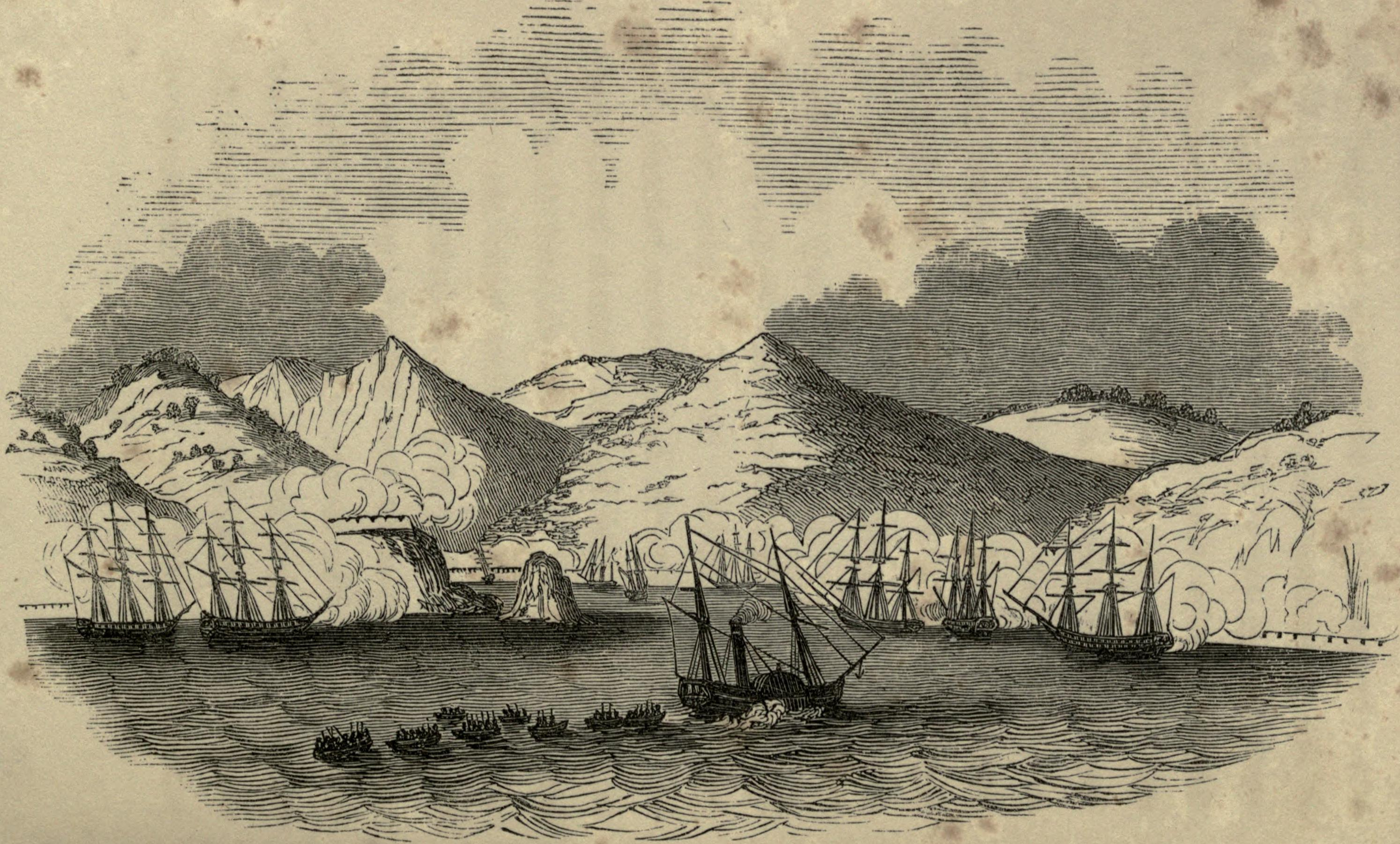
Storming of Xiamen by the British fleet

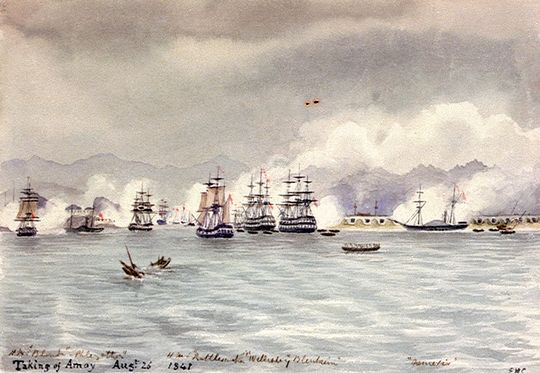
Taking of Xiamen

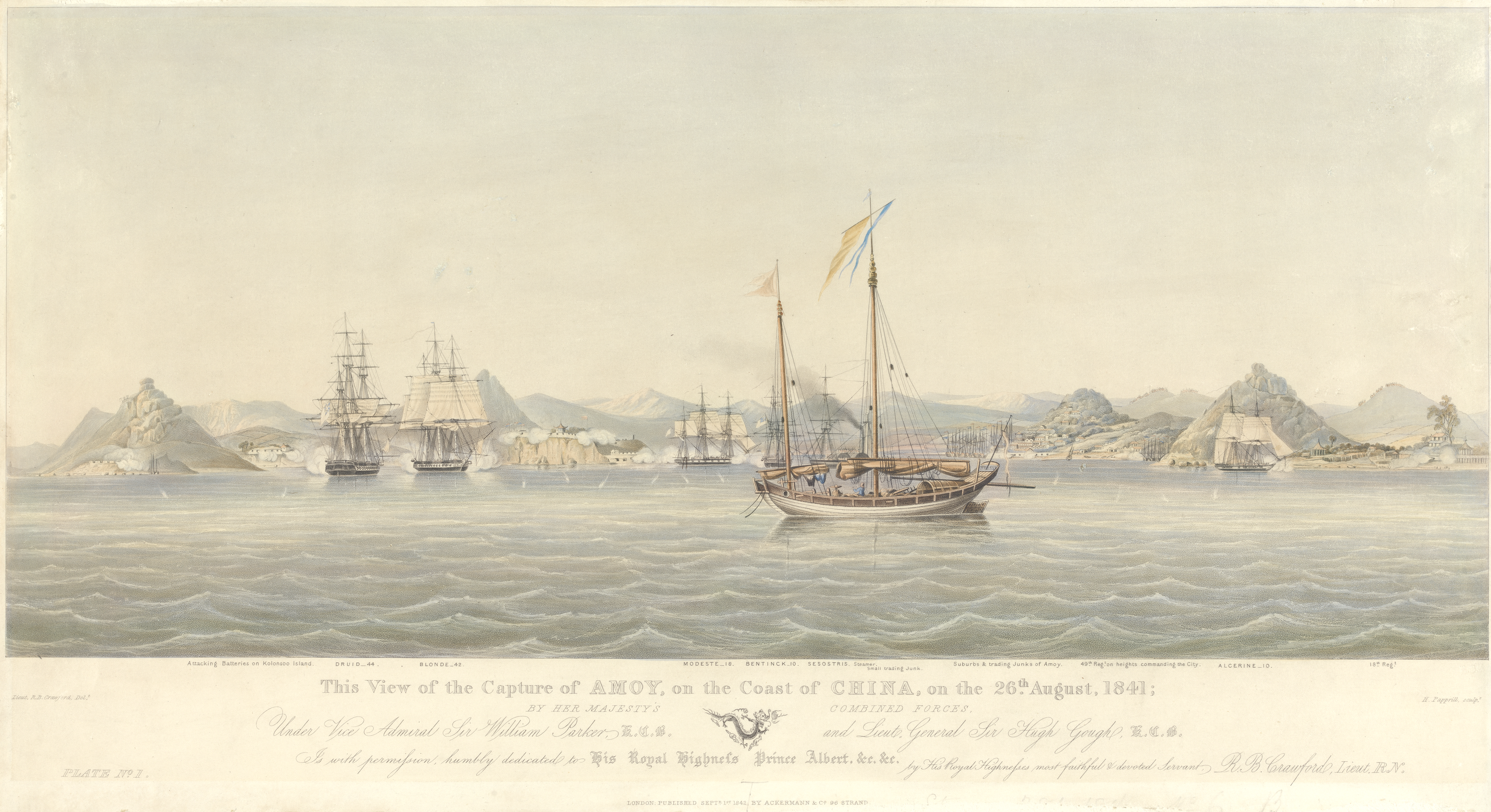
Capture of Xiamen, plate 1

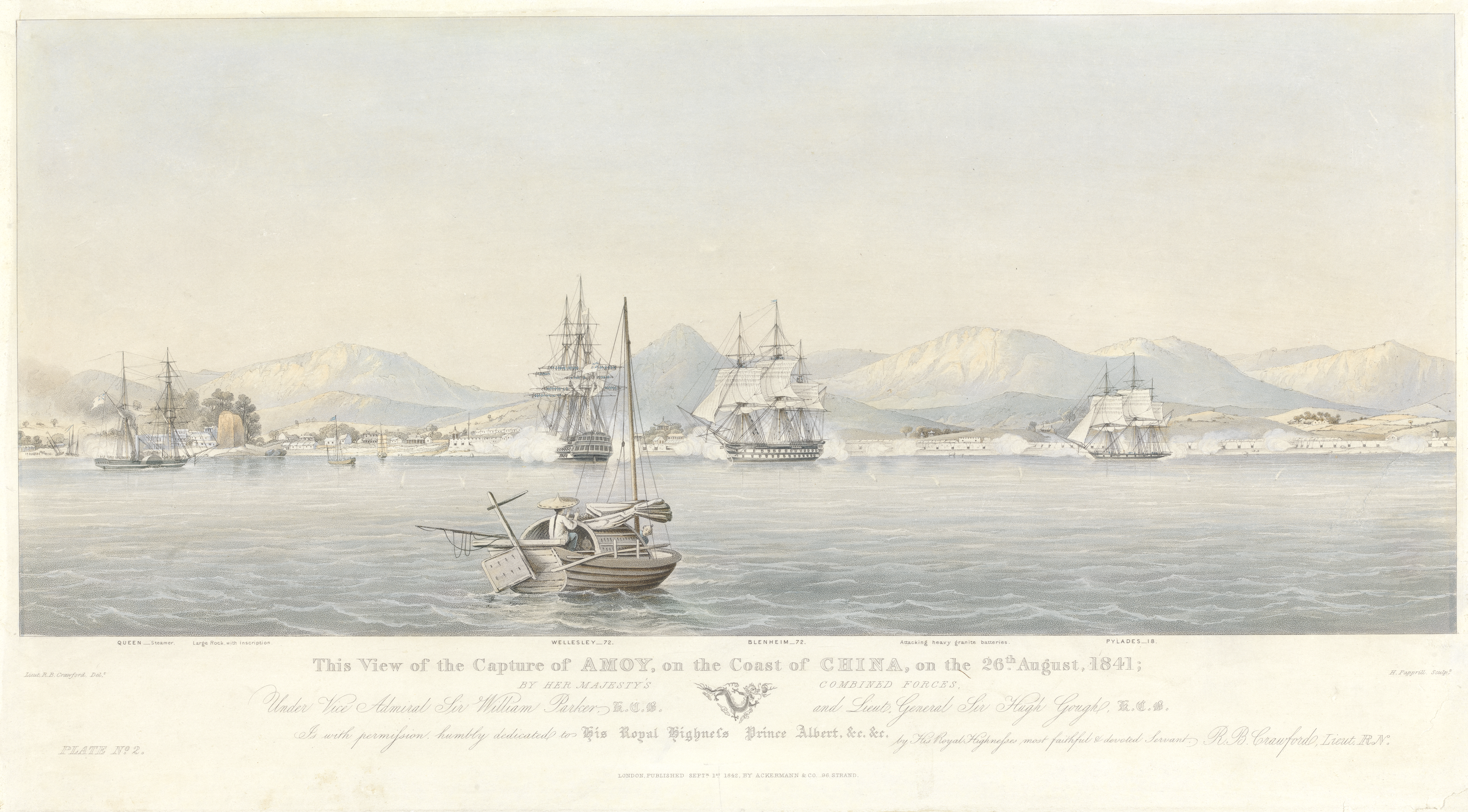
Plate 2

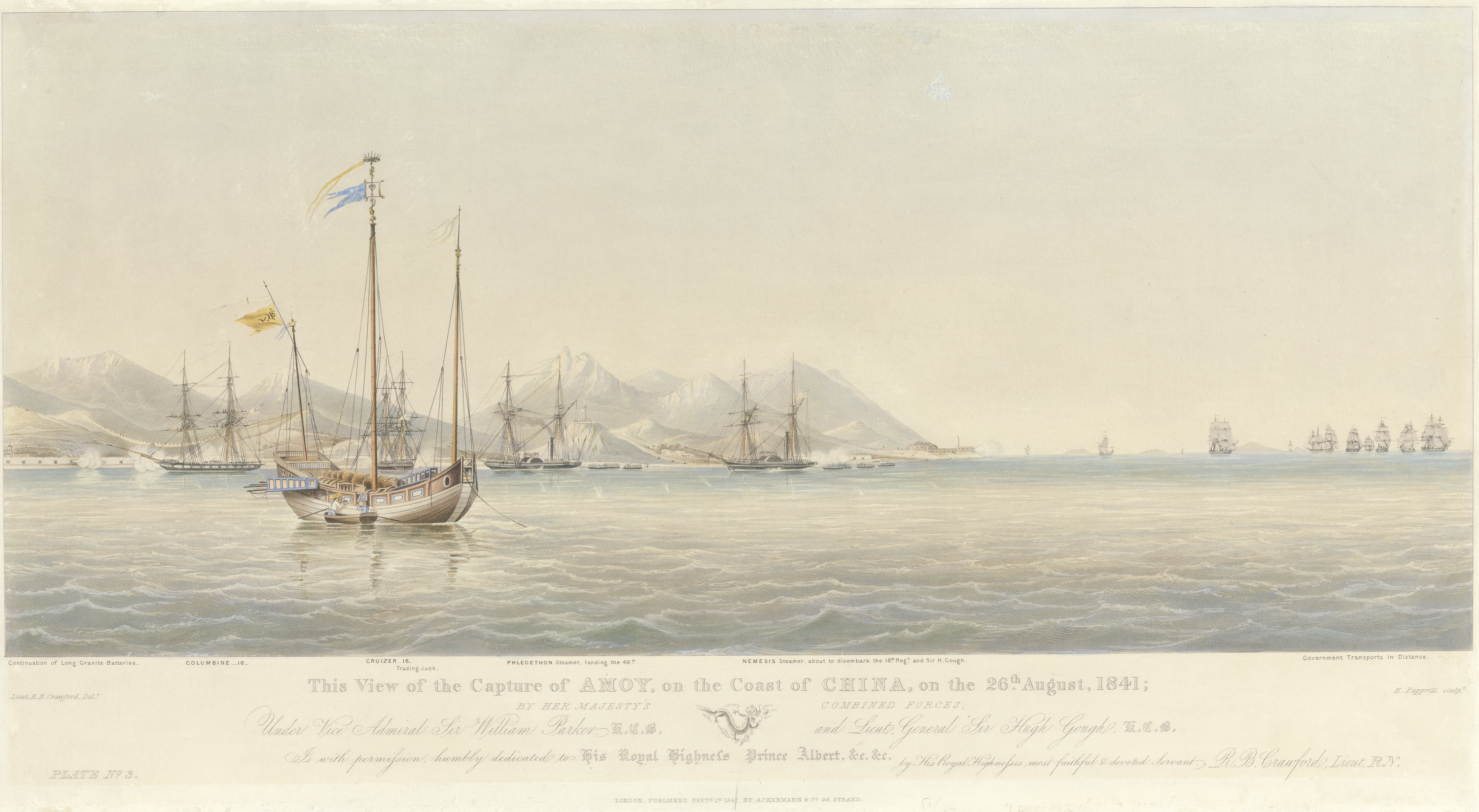
Plate 3
