= George Edward Anson =

British courtier and politician

- Born: 14 May 1812
- Died: 8 October 1849 (aged 37)
- Occupations: Courtier, politician
- Parent(s): Frederick Anson (1779–1867); Mary Vernon

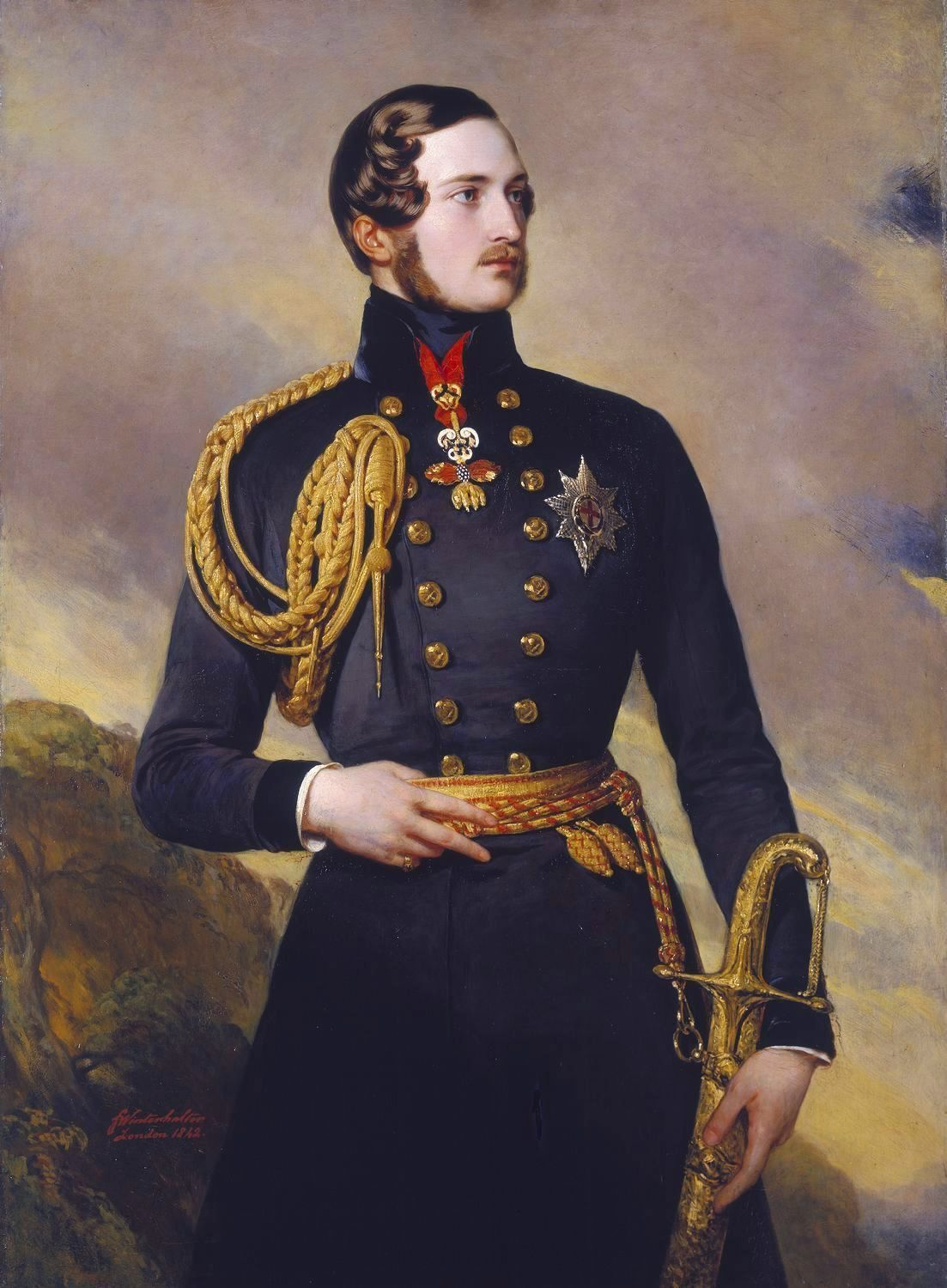
Prince Albert, whose private secretary was George Edward Anson.

George Edward Anson (14 May 1812 – 8 October 1849) was a British courtier and politician from the Anson family.

Anson was the son of the Very Reverend Frederick Anson (1779–1867), Dean of Chester, son of George Anson and the Honourable Mary Vernon, daughter of George Venables-Vernon, 1st Baron Vernon. Frederick Anson was his brother. He served as Keeper of Her Majesty's Privy Purse, Treasurer of the Household to HRH Prince Albert, Treasurer and Cofferer of the Household of HRH the Prince of Wales, a member of the Council of the Duchy of Lancaster and of the Prince of Wales's Council for the Duchy of Cornwall.

Anson served as private secretary to Prince Albert, and was frequently employed on diplomatic missions for the Prince. He was married to the Honourable Georgiana Mary Harbord, who was a Woman of the Bedchamber to the Queen and sister of Edward, Third Lord Suffield. Anson died at age 37 in Barton-under-Needwood, Staffordshire. He was the son of the Rev. Frederick Anson, Dean of Chester, born at Shugborough Hall, and his wife Anne, only daughter of Rev. Richard Levett and Louisa Frances (Bagot) of Milford Hall.

Court offices
| Preceded by Sir Henry Wheatley, 1st Baronet | Keeper of the Privy Purse; 1847–1849 | Succeeded by Sir Charles Beaumont Phipps |
