= George Anson Starkweather (New York politician) =

American politician (1794–1879)

George A. Starkweather
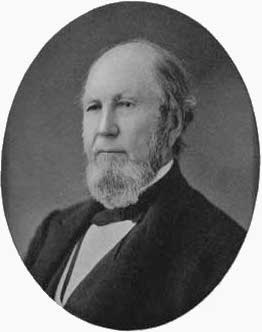

Member of the U.S. House of Representatives from New York's 21st district
- In office March 4, 1847 – March 3, 1849
- Preceded by: Charles Goodyear
- Succeeded by: Hiram Walden

Personal details
- Born: George Anson Starkweather; May 19, 1794 Preston, Connecticut
- Died: October 15, 1879 (aged 85) Cooperstown, New York
- Resting place: Lakewood Cemetery, Cooperstown, New York
- Party: Democratic
- Spouse: Elizabeth Georgiana Converse (m. 1828-1879, his death)
- Children: 12, including John Converse Starkweather
- Education: Union College
- Profession: Attorney

Military service
- Allegiance: United States; New York
- Branch/service: New York Militia
- Years of service: 1820s
- Rank: Colonel
- Unit: 12th Artillery Regiment

George Anson Starkweather (Note: There were several George Anson Starkweathers, all related and living in the same time period, including Starkweather's son George Anson Starkweather, nephew George Anson Starkweather, of Plymouth, Michigan, and third cousin once removed George Anson Starkweather, a lawyer and merchant in Waymart, Pennsylvania.) (May 19, 1794 – October 15, 1879) was an American attorney and politician. He was most notable for his service as a United States representative from New York, serving one term from 1847 to 1849.

== Biography ==
Starkweather was born in Preston, Connecticut on May 19, 1794. He attended the local schools of Preston and worked on his father's farm until he began attendance at Union College. He graduated in 1819 and was a member of Phi Beta Kappa. Starkweather taught school while studying law with his brother Samuel. He was admitted to the bar in 1823 and practiced in Cooperstown, New York.

Starkweather was active in the New York Militia for several years in the 1820s and served as major, lieutenant colonel, and colonel of the 12th Artillery Regiment prior to being discharged. A Democrat, Starkweather was chairman of the party's Otsego County corresponding committee and a delegate to numerous county and state conventions. He was a delegate to the 1835 Democratic National Convention, and was chosen to serve as the convention's secretary.

In addition to his political activities, Starkweather was active in local government in Cooperstown and Otsego County. Among the positions he held were county commissioner of deeds, county surrogate judge, town supervisor, and chairman of the county board of supervisors.

=== Congress ===
In 1846, Starkweather was the successful Democratic nominee for a seat in the United States House of Representatives. He served in the 30th United States Congress (March 4, 1847 - March 3, 1849). During his term, Starkweather made a speech in opposition to extending slavery beyond the states in which it already existed, which was the subject of favorable mentions in the country's newspapers.

=== Later career and death ===
After leaving Congress, Starkweather resumed the practice of law. He later moved to Milwaukee, Wisconsin, where he practiced law from 1853 to 1868.

Starkweather died in Cooperstown on October 15, 1879. He was buried at Lakewood Cemetery in Cooperstown.

== Family ==
In 1828, Starkweather married Elizabeth Georgiana Converse. They were the parents of 12 children:

John Converse
Elizabeth Georgiana (born and died in 1832)
George Anson
Augustus Converse
Elizabeth Georgiana (b. 1838)
William Henry
Frederick Tiffany
Charles Austin
Francis A.
Frank Morgan
Alexander Brachus
Edgar

John Converse Starkweather was notable for his service as a Union Army officer in the American Civil War.

Nebraska spree killer Charles Starkweather was his great-great grandson, through his son Frank Morgan Starkweather.

== Notes ==
U.S. House of Representatives
Preceded by Charles Goodyear	Member of the U.S. House of Representatives from New York's 21st congressional district 1847–1849	Succeeded by Hiram Walden
