= George Anson Starkweather (Michigan businessman) =

American politician (1826–1907)

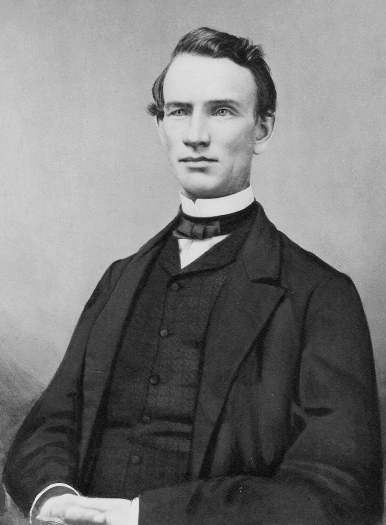
Starkweather in 1856

George Anson Starkweather (February 20, 1826 – February 7, 1907) was an American merchant, schoolteacher, lawyer, farmer, greenhouse owner, banker, Plymouth Village President, Plymouth Township Supervisor, philanthropist, leading community member and firm believer in education who, during the 1850s, served one term in the Michigan Legislature, representing Plymouth.

According to the Detroit Free Press (Feb. 7, 1907, p. 10, col. 2), he was the first white person born in Plymouth, or he was second non-Native American born in what is now known as the city of Plymouth in Michigan's Wayne County, Starkweather, who is not to be confused with his uncle, a New York political figure named George Anson Starkweather, or several other distant cousins also named George Anson Starkweather, was a first cousin to John Converse Starkweather and a descendant of Robert Starkweather who came from the British Isles in 1641 and settled the area referred to as the Cornhill Section of Boston.

Having studied law in New York, he returned home to Plymouth, established himself as a pillar of the community and helped to bring a railroad route to Plymouth (much to the chagrin, it is said, of present-day residents of the community) through what is now known as "Old Village" or "Lower Town". In 1927, Starkweather Elementary school on Holbrook Street was named in his memory. Starkweather died at the age of 81. He is buried at Riverside Cemetery in Plymouth, Michigan.
