= Frederick Anson (dean of Chester) =

English clergyman and Dean of Chester

Frederick Anson (23 March 1779 – 8 May 1867) was an English clergyman who was Dean of Chester from 1839 until his death.

He was a member of the Anson family, the son of George Anson (1731–1789) and the father of Frederick Anson and George Edward Anson. Educated at Christ Church, Oxford, where he graduated BA in 1800, he was ordained in 1802, having also become a fellow of All Souls College, Oxford. From 1803 to 1836, he was Rector of Sudbury in Derbyshire.
