= John Converse Starkweather =

American lawyer (1829–1890)

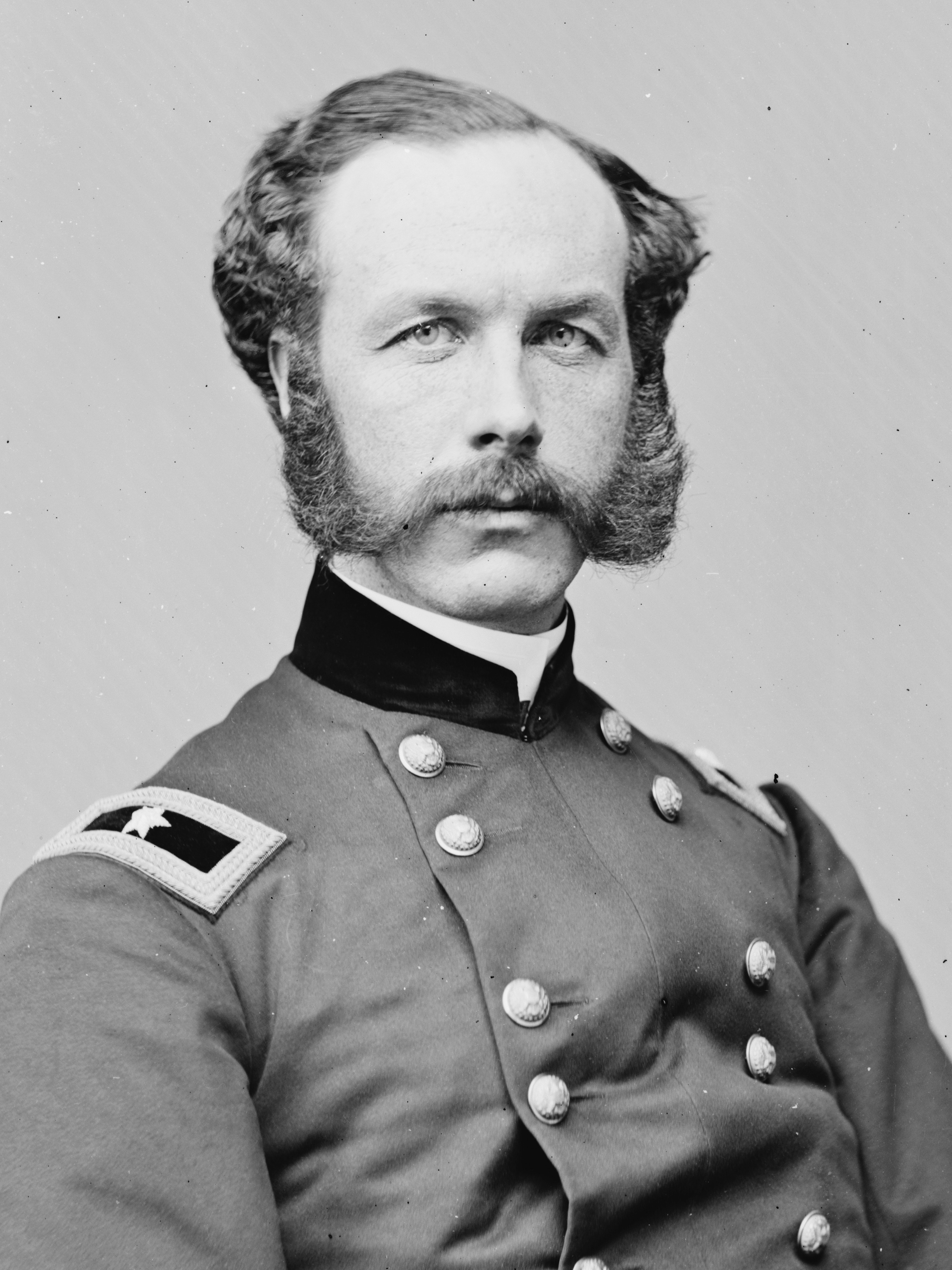
- Born: February 23, 1829; Cooperstown, New York, U.S.
- Died: November 15, 1890 (aged 61); Washington, D.C., U.S.
- Burial place: Forest Home Cemetery, Milwaukee, Wisconsin
- Spouse: Louisa A. Hallett
- Children: 6
- Military career
- Allegiance: United States
- Branch: United States Army; Union Army
- Service years: 1861–1865
- Rank: Brigadier General, USV
- Commands: 1st Reg. Wis. Vol. Infantry
- Conflicts: American Civil War; Battle of Hoke's Run; Battle of Perryville; Battle of Stones River; Battle of Chickamauga

John Converse Starkweather (February 23, 1829 – November 15, 1890) was a general in the Union Army during the American Civil War.

== Early life and career ==
John C. Starkweather was born in Cooperstown, New York, the eldest son of George A. Starkweather and Elizabeth (Converse) Starkweather. He married Louisa A. Hallett, the daughter of William P. and Rachel Ray Hallet. He graduated from Union College, class of 1850, and studied law and was admitted to the bar in 1857. He moved to Milwaukee, Wisconsin, and practiced law there until 1861.

== Civil War ==
On May 17, 1861, he was made colonel of the 1st Wisconsin Volunteer Infantry Regiment (3 Months) and took part in the battles of Battle of Hoke's Run (also known as Falling Waters), July 2, 1861, and of Edmunds Ferry, July 29, 1861. He was mustered out on August 21, 1861.

Re-organizing his regiment for three years, by special order of the War Department, Starkweather again enlisted and served in Kentucky and northern Alabama. In command of a brigade, he participated creditably in the Battle of Perryville, October 8, 1862. He was also engaged in the Battle of Stones River and the Battle of Chickamauga where he was wounded. He was promoted to brigadier general on July 17, 1863.

He served in the court-martial that tried General William Alexander Hammond, Surgeon General of the United States Army, and after commanding several posts in Tennessee and Alabama, he was mustered out of the army on May 11, 1865.

== Postbellum career ==
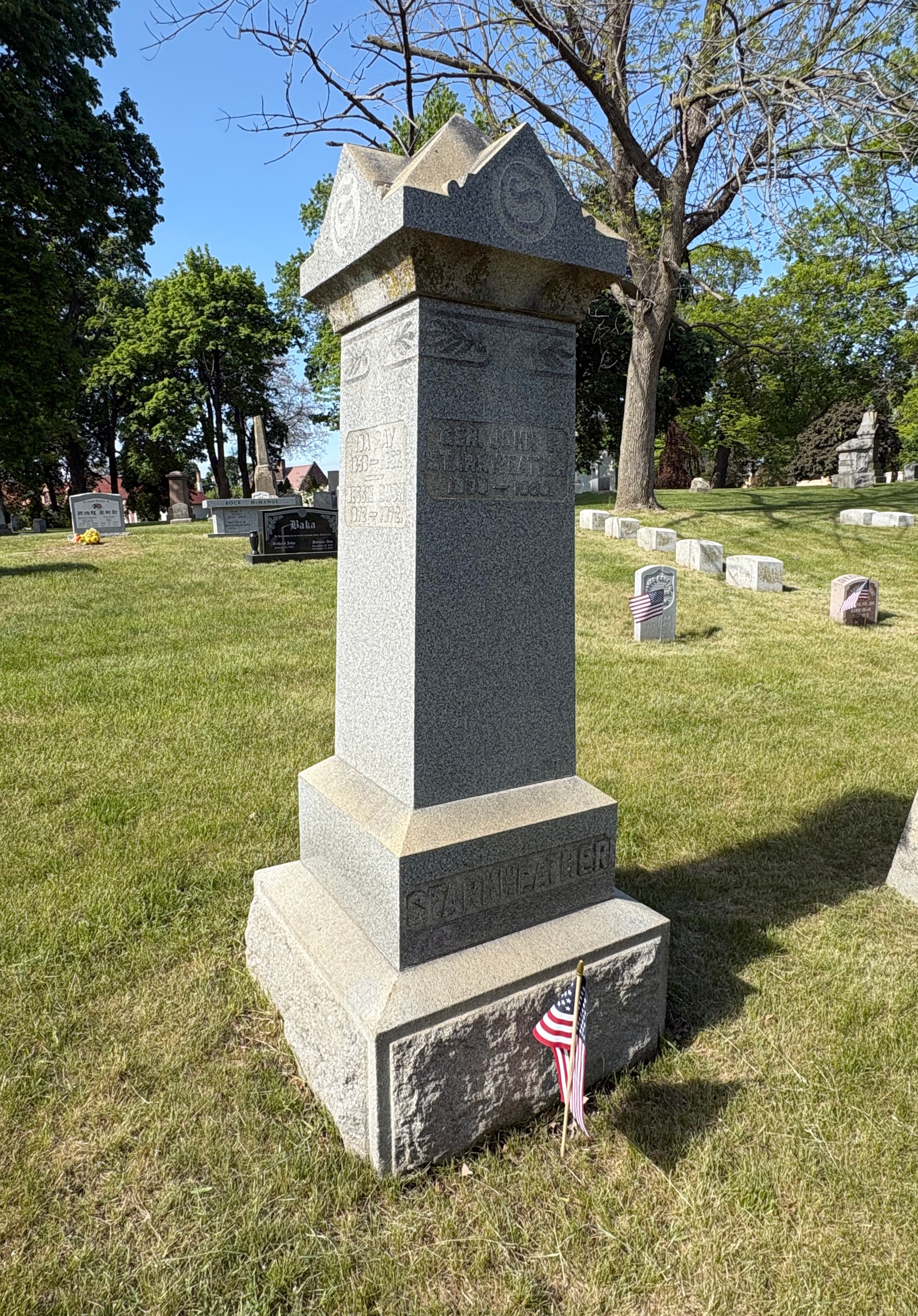
Starkweather's grave at Forest Home Cemetery

Starkweather and his wife Louisa had six children—Walter Augustus, George Anson, Mabel Ray, Rachel Field, Francis Morgan, and Bessie Bush.

After farming for several years in Wisconsin and occupying posts of importance and trust, he moved to Washington, D.C., where he practiced law until his death there in 1890. He was buried at Forest Home Cemetery in Milwaukee.

== See also ==
- List of American Civil War generals (Union)

Military offices
Regiment established	Command of the 1st Wisconsin Infantry Regiment; April 16, 1861 – July 17, 1863	Succeeded by George B. Bingham
