= Sir William Anson, 1st Baronet =

British Army general

General Sir William Anson Bt KCB
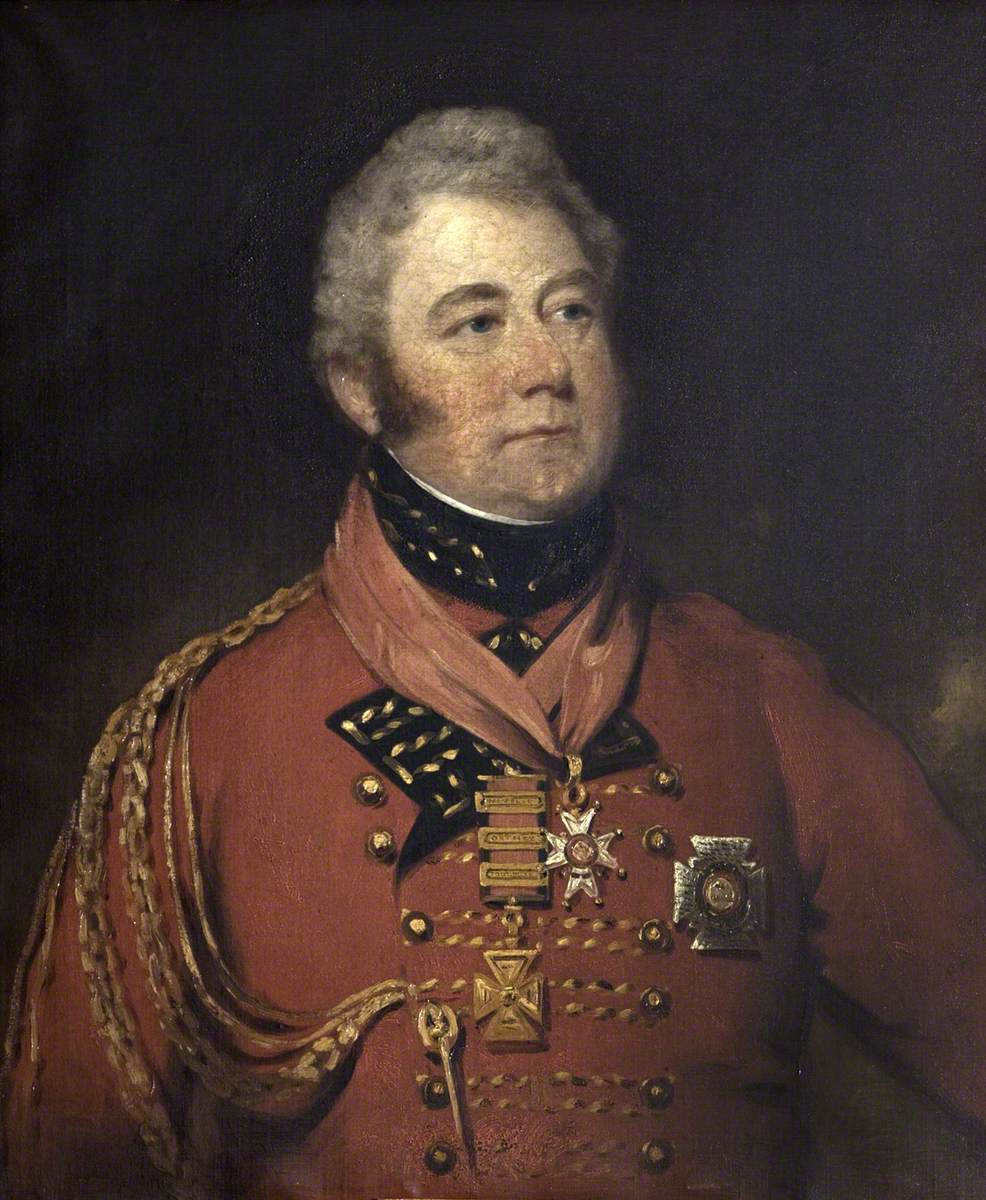
- Anson in 1815
- Born: William Adams; 13 August 1772
- Died: 13 January 1847 (aged 74); Brockhall, Northamptonshire
- Burial place: Kensal Green Cemetery, London
- Military career
- Allegiance: United Kingdom
- Branch: British Army
- Service years: 1789–1847
- Rank: General
- Unit: 1st Foot Guards
- Commands: 1st Battalion, 1st Foot Guards; Guards Brigade; 1st Brigade, 4th Division; 4th Division; 2nd Division
- Conflicts: French Revolutionary Wars; Flanders Campaign; Napoleonic Wars; Walcheren Campaign; Peninsular War; Battle of Corunna; Battle of Salamanca; Battle of Vitoria; Battle of the Pyrenees; Battle of Sorauren; Battle of Nivelle; Battle of Orthes; Battle of Toulouse
- Awards: Baronet; Army Gold Cross with 3 bars Mentioned in dispatches 4 times

General Sir William Anson, 1st Baronet, KCB (13 August 1772 – 13 January 1847) was a British Army officer of the Anson family. Serving in the 1st Foot Guards, Anson saw service in the Flanders Campaign during the French Revolutionary Wars. He assumed command of the 1st Battalion, 1st Foot Guards, during the Napoleonic Wars and commanded it at the Battle of Corunna.

Promoted to major-general in 1811, Anson continued serving in the Peninsular War, commanding a brigade within the 4th Division. At the end of the Napoleonic Wars in 1814, he was given command of the 2nd Division but did not serve during the Hundred Days in 1815. With no further active military service, Anson was created a baronet in 1831 and by seniority rose to the rank of general in 1837.

== Early life ==
William Anson was born on 13 August 1772, the third son of George Anson and Mary Vernon; until 1773 his family went by the surname of Adams. His maternal grandfather was Lord Vernon, and his brothers included the future Lord Anson and General Sir George Anson. He spent his childhood at the family home of Shugborough Hall in Staffordshire.

== Military career ==
=== Early career ===
On 13 June 1789 Anson joined the British Army, being commissioned as an ensign in the 1st Foot Guards which was the regiment members of his family traditionally joined. He travelled with the 1st Battalion of his regiment to serve in the Flanders campaign on 25 February 1793, fighting at the Battle of Famars on 23 May and then at the beginning of the siege of Valenciennes in the same month. He left the campaign after only two months, returning home upon his promotion to lieutenant and captain, which had occurred on 25 April. Anson returned to the campaign on 1 April 1794, staying there through the retreat of the army in the winter until the end of the campaign in May of the following year. On 28 September 1797 he was promoted to captain and lieutenant colonel, becoming a company commander in the 1st Foot Guards. He was promoted again on 30 October 1805, becoming a colonel, but continued to command a company within the 1st Battalion. On 25 July 1806 the battalion was sent to serve in Sicily, with Anson there as commander of the Grenadier Company. The battalion, and Anson, returned to England on 4 January 1808.

By September 1808 Anson had been given command of his battalion. Sent to join Lieutenant-General Sir John Moore's army in Portugal, they arrived at Corunna on 28 October. On 19 November Anson replaced Major-General Henry Warde as commander of the Guards Brigade in the army, when the latter was moved to command a temporary division. The army was reorganised again on 20 December and Anson resumed command of his battalion. Soon after this the retreat to Corunna began, with Moore chased by a large French army. As part of the strenuous action, Anson's battalion often fought in the army's rearguard before reaching Corunna in early January 1809; soldier Robert Arbuthnot described the arrival of Anson's battalion after the forced march as "a fine sight, and one he would never forget".

Moore fought the Battle of Corunna on 16 January, but while Anson took part in it the battalion was only lightly engaged. They afterwards returned to England, where on 16 July the battalion joined the Walcheren Expedition. The expedition was wrought with disease and Anson's unit stayed there for only two months before being sent home again, arriving on 14 September. Hit hard by the fevers, by February 1810 the 1,524 man strong battalion had lost 103 men, while a further ten percent of the battalion were so incapacitated from illness that they were unable to serve again. Anson stayed with the battalion until his promotion to major general on 4 June 1811. He was then sent to serve on the military staff in Ireland.

=== General ===
Anson was sent to serve in the Peninsular War, on the staff of General Lord Wellington, on 3 November 1811. He arrived in Portugal in April 1812. Anson spent only a very brief period on Wellington's staff, because on 9 April he was appointed to replace Major-General James Kemmis as commander of the 1st Brigade of the 4th Division. His command was backdated to 25 November 1811, and he entered it just after the brigade had finished fighting in the successful siege of Badajoz. The division's commander, Major-General Galbraith Lowry Cole, was on sick leave at the time and so Anson also took command of the division when he joined his brigade. Anson led the 4th Division into Spain on 13 June, and returned to his division three weeks later when Cole returned from his convalescence.

On 18 July Anson led his brigade at the Battle of Castrillo, a running combat that took place over several hours around Castrejon. The 4th Division held a position above the Guareña River, and was attacked there by the advancing division of Antoine François Brenier de Montmorand. Anson's brigade was in reserve, and Wellington ordered them forward in line to face Brenier's columns; with his line longer than the front of the French columns, Anson was able to wrap around the attacking French force before it could deploy, firing into it and forcing it back towards the Guareña. The brigade then fought at the Battle of Salamanca on 22 July, where they were positioned on the left flank of the 4th Division.

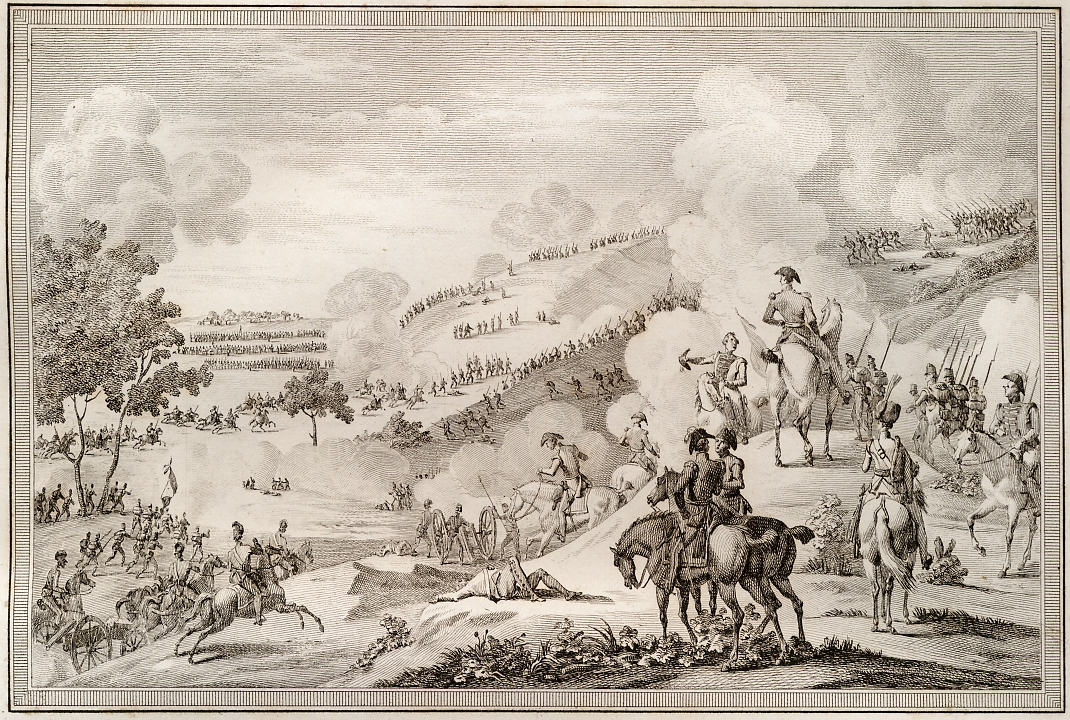
Anson commanded a brigade at the Battle of Salamanca

Tasked with holding the Lesser Arapile hill that stood out at an angle to the rest of the battlefield, the 3rd Battalion of the 27th Regiment of Foot was set out on the summit, with the 1st Battalion of the 40th Regiment of Foot on the slope behind them. From its position the brigade was able to help cover Colonel Denis Pack's brigade as it retreated beneath the hill, and then provided great assistance in the destruction of the main French assault as it attacked the centre of the British line in the mid afternoon, attempting to force the gap in the line next to the Lesser Arapile. During the battle Cole and the other two brigade commanders in the 4th Division were badly wounded, leaving Anson in command of the division for the remainder. He continued in temporary command as the army advanced towards Madrid, before relinquishing the division back to Cole upon his return in October.

Anson subsequently fought with his brigade at the Battle of Vitoria on 21 June 1813, and then at the Battle of Sorauren between 28 July and 1 August. In mid-October they crossed over the Pyrenees and fought at the Battle of Nivelle on 10 November before going into winter quarters. In December a change in senior officers in the army was occurring, and it was expected that as part of this Anson would be given command of the Guards Brigade again, but this position instead went to Colonel Peregrine Maitland. Anson's brigade was in action at the Battle of Orthes on 27 February 1814 and then at the Battle of Toulouse on 10 April. With the Napoleonic Wars then over Wellington began to break up his army, as such of its size was no longer needed. As the break up was occurring Anson was given command of the 2nd Division, where he stayed until it was disbanded in June of the same year.

=== Later service ===
Not given a command during the Waterloo Campaign, Anson never again saw active service in the army. He was made a Knight Commander of the Order of the Bath on 2 January 1815, and in 1816 joined the Consolidated Board of General Officers. For his service in the Peninsular War he also received the Army Gold Medal with three clasps, having been mentioned in dispatches four times. He was promoted to lieutenant-general on 12 August 1819. He became colonel of the 66th Regiment of Foot on 7 December 1829, and stayed in that position until 25 March 1835 when he changed to the colonelcy of the 47th Regiment of Foot, which he held until his death. The Anson baronetcy 'of Birch Hall' was created for him on 30 September 1831, and he was promoted to general on 10 January 1837. Anson died on 13 January 1847 at Brockhall, Northamptonshire at the age of 74, and was buried in the family catacombs at Kensal Green Cemetery, London.

== Personality and influence ==
Military historians Ron McGuigan and Robert Burnham describe Anson as a "tough but fair disciplinarian", giving as proof the wide variety of verdicts he gave in courts martial presided over by him. Anson was also well-liked by his subordinates, who he often attempted to advance within the army, with only limited success. This was because Anson had relatively little influence inside or outside the army (unlike his brother George), and evinced little personal ambition. Known as a competent brigade commander who did as ordered and expected nothing else, McGuigan and Burnham pose that if the Peninsular War had lasted longer Anson would have been given a permanent divisional command.

== Family ==
On 26 January 1815 Anson married Louisa Frances Mary Dickenson (died 25 July 1837), daughter of John Dickenson and Mary Hamilton (Granddaughter of Lord Archibald Hamilton). They had four sons and three daughters:

- Sir John William Hamilton Anson, 2nd Baronet (born 20 December 1816)
- Mary Louisa (born 5 January 1818), who married the Reverend Matthew Thomas Farrer (1816–1899)
- William Vernon-Dickenson (10 February 1819), a Royal Navy who died serving off the coast of Africa
- George Henry Grenville (born 19 July 1820), later became Archdeacon of Manchester
- Anne Georgiana Frances (born 14 July 1822), who married the Reverend William Thornton
- Archibald Edward Harbord (born 16 April 1826), a Royal Artillery officer
- Louisa Frances Maria (born 16 April 1826)

== Citations ==
Military offices
Preceded by Alexander Hope	Colonel of the 47th (Lancashire) Regiment of Foot; 1835–1847	Succeeded by Sir Harry Smith, Bt
Preceded by Oliver Nicolls	Colonel of the 66th (Berkshire) Regiment of Foot; 1829–1835	Succeeded by Richard Blunt
Baronetage of the United Kingdom
New creation	Baronet (of Birch Hall); 1831–1847	Succeeded by John Anson
