= George Anson (British Army officer, born 1769) =

British Army officer and Whig politician

General Sir George Anson GCB
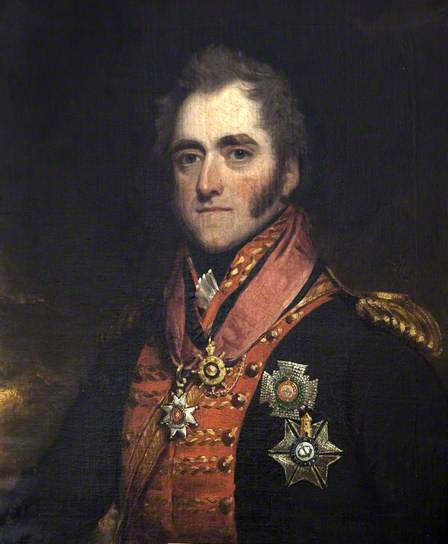
- Born: George Adams; 1769
- Died: 4 November 1849 (aged 80)
- Military career
- Branch: British Army
- Rank: General
- Conflicts: French Revolutionary Wars; Peninsular War
- Awards: Knight Grand Cross of the Order of the Bath

General Sir George Anson, GCB (born Adams; 1769 – 4 November 1849), was a British officer and politician from the Anson family. He commanded a British cavalry brigade under the Duke of Wellington during the Peninsular War and sat for many years as a Whig Member of Parliament.

== Early life ==
Anson was the second son of George Adams (who changed the family surname to Anson by royal license on 30 April 1773) and his wife The Hon. Mary Vernon, daughter of the first Lord Vernon. He had an elder brother, Thomas Anson, 1st Viscount Anson, and a younger brother, Sir William Anson, 1st Baronet; another younger brother was Frederick Anson, who became Dean of Chester.

== Career ==
=== The Peninsular Wars and gaining of reputation ===
He entered the British Army in 1786 and served under the Duke of York and Sir Ralph Abercromby in Holland. It was to be in the Peninsular War where his reputation grew markedly. He served in all the campaigns between 1809 and 1813 and gained distinction in his command of the 16th Light Dragoons at the Second Battle of Porto. His reputation was further enhanced by his command of a brigade of light cavalry at the Battles of Talavera, Busaco, Salamanca and Vittoria. He also fought in the Battle of Venta del Pozo during the retreat from Burgos. For his services in the Battles of Talavera, Salamanca and Vittoria he received a medal and two clasps. So prominent was he during these campaigns that the House of Commons thanked him in November 1816 for his services generally during the Peninsular Wars.

In August 1814, he was appointed to the colonelcy of the 23rd Regiment of (Light) Dragoons and in February 1827 to the colonelcy of the 4th Dragoon Guards. He was promoted to the rank of full general on 10 January 1837.

=== Outside conflict ===
Aside from his military career he also sat as Member of Parliament for Lichfield from 1806 to 1841. He was also the Groom of the Bedchamber to Prince Albert from 1836 to September 1841. In 1846 he was appointed the lieutenant-governor of the Royal Hospital, Chelsea and became governor in May 1849.

== Marriage and descendants ==
Anson married Frances, daughter of John William Hamilton, in 1800. She was also the sister of Sir Frederick Hamilton, 5th Baronet of Silverton Hill. They had six sons and five daughters.

Their son Talavera Vernon Anson became an admiral in the Royal Navy. Another son, Thomas Anson, was a first-class cricketer. Their daughter Julia married Sir Arthur Brinsley Brooke and served as a lady in waiting to Queen Victoria.

Lady Anson died in 1834. Anson survived her by fifteen years and died at the Royal Hospital, Chelsea, in November 1849.

In Who Do You Think You Are?, transmitted on the BBC on 18 October 2007, it was discovered that Sir Matthew Pinsent, the multiple gold medal Olympic rower, is a direct descendant of Sir George Anson.

Parliament of the United Kingdom
Preceded by Thomas Anson; Sir John Wrottesley	Member of Parliament for Lichfield; 1806–1841; With: Sir John Wrottesley 1806; George Granville Venables-Vernon 1806–1831; Sir Edward Scott 1831–1837; Lord Alfred Paget 1837–1841	Succeeded by Lord Alfred Paget; Granville Leveson-Gower
Military offices
Preceded by Sir Henry Fane	Colonel of the 4th Royal Irish Dragoon Guards; 1827–1849	Succeeded by Richard Pigot
Honorary titles
Preceded by Sir Edward Paget	Governor, Royal Hospital Chelsea; 1849	Succeeded by Sir Colin Halkett
