= George Anson Starkweather (Pennsylvania lawyer) =

American lawyer

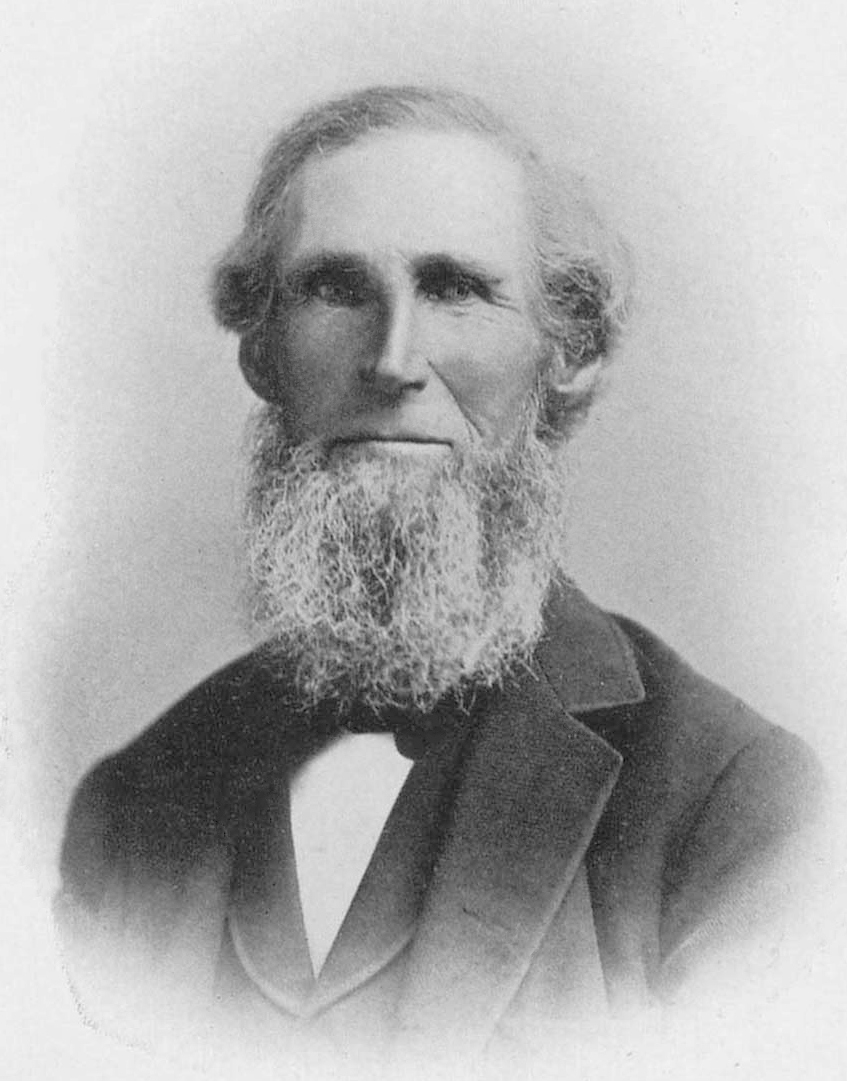
George Anson Starkweather

George Anson Starkweather (November 7, 1821 – August 11, 1904) was an American lawyer, merchant, schoolteacher and public official in Pennsylvania.

== Biography ==
Starkweather served as auditor of Wayne County, township clerk for Canaan, director of one of the examining boards for teachers, overseer of the poor, justice of the peace, and assessor.

A native of the Wayne County borough of Waymart, he built a leather tannery there in 1859, but the structure was subsequently destroyed in a fire.

George Anson Starkweather died at the age of 82.
