= Thomas Anson, 1st Viscount Anson =

British politician and hereditary peer (1767–1818)

The Right Honourable The Viscount Anson
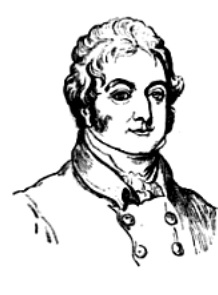
- Thomas Anson (1767–1818), after T. Phillips, by 1886. Member of Parliament.

Member of Parliament for Lichfield
- In office 1789–1806 Serving with Sir John Wrottesley
- Preceded by: Thomas Gilbert; George Anson
- Succeeded by: Sir John Wrottesley; Sir George Anson

Personal details
- Born: Thomas Adams; 14 February 1767
- Died: 31 July 1818 (aged 51)
- Spouse: Lady Anne Margaret Coke (m. 1794)
- Children: 13, including Thomas and George
- Parents: George Anson; Mary Vernon

Thomas Anson, 1st Viscount Anson (14 February 1767 – 31 July 1818) was a British politician and peer from the Anson family.

== Background and career ==
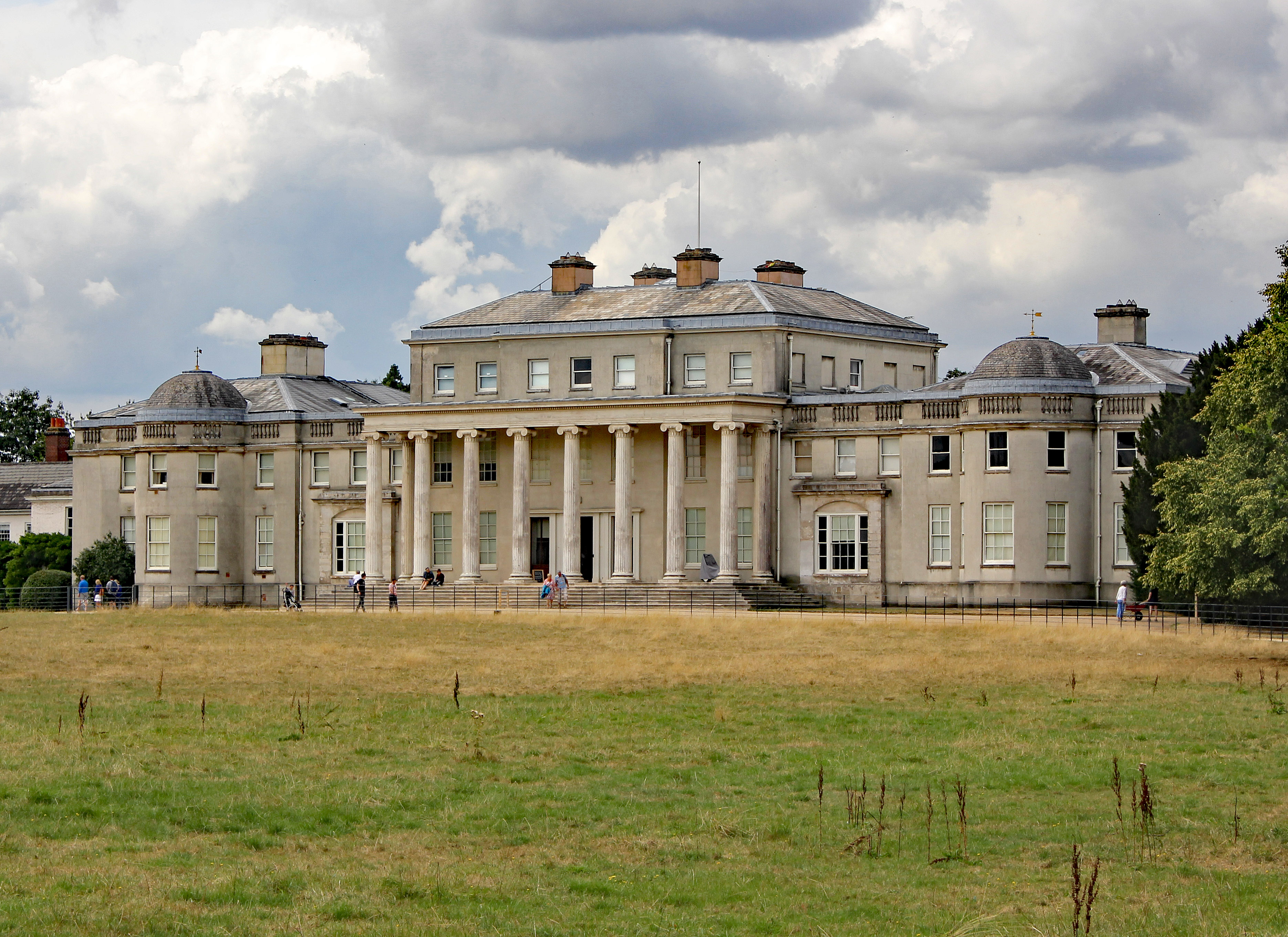
Shugborough Hall, seats of Earls of Lichfield, Viscount Anson.

Thomas Anson was born 14 February 1767, the first son of George Anson, of Shugborough and Mary Vernon, the daughter of George Venables Vernon. The family's surname was Adams until 1773, when his father inherited the Anson estates upon the death of his maternal uncles and his unmarried older brother, Thomas.

He was the brother of Mary Anson (born 1759), who married Sir Francis Ford, 1st Baronet, in 1785. Thomas's brothers included army generals Sir George Anson and Sir William Anson.

He was educated at Eton College in 1779 and Oriel College, Oxford, in 1784.

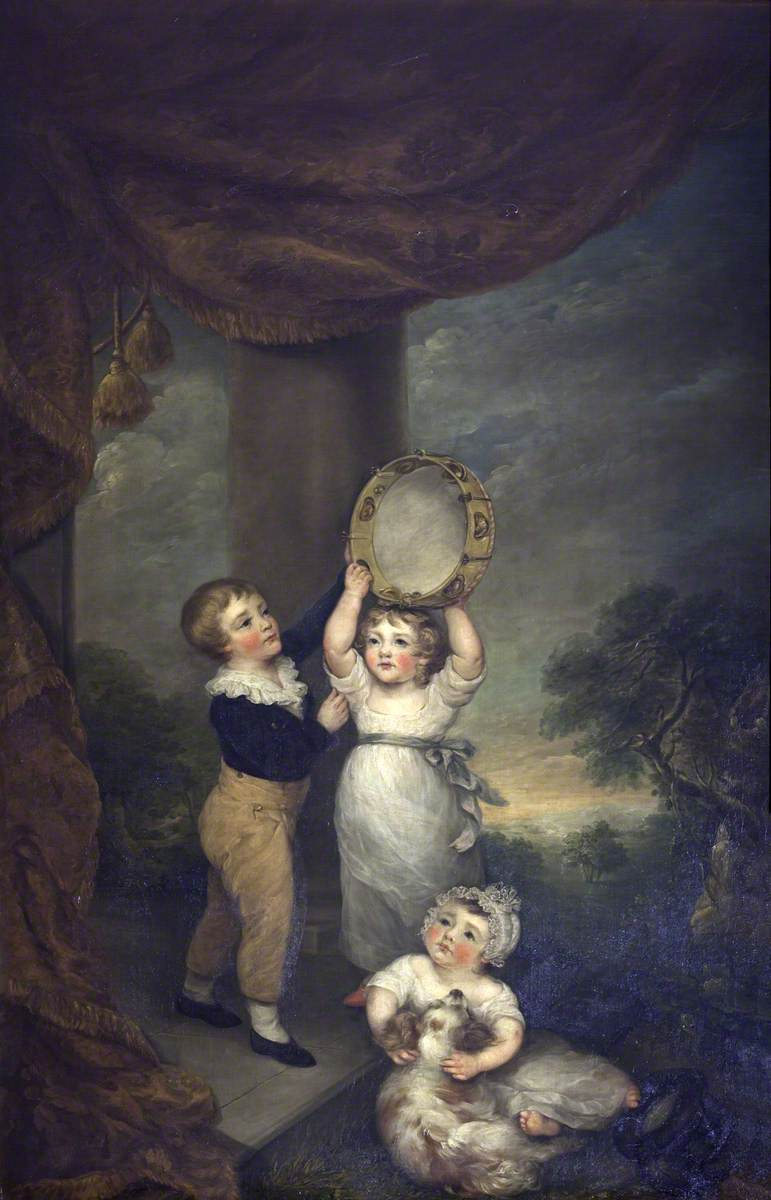
Anne Margaret Coke, Viscountess Anson, Thomas William Anson, Anne Margaret Anson, and George Anson, as Children, Shugborough Hall, National Trust

On his father's death in 1789, Thomas Anson succeeded him as Member of Parliament for Lichfield, which he represented until 17 February 1806, when he was succeeded by his brother, George. On leaving the House of Commons on 17 February 1806, Anson was created Viscount Anson, of Shugborough and Orgrave, Co. Stafford, and Baron Soberton, of Soberton, Co. Southampton, in the Peerage of the United Kingdom.

== Marriage and children ==
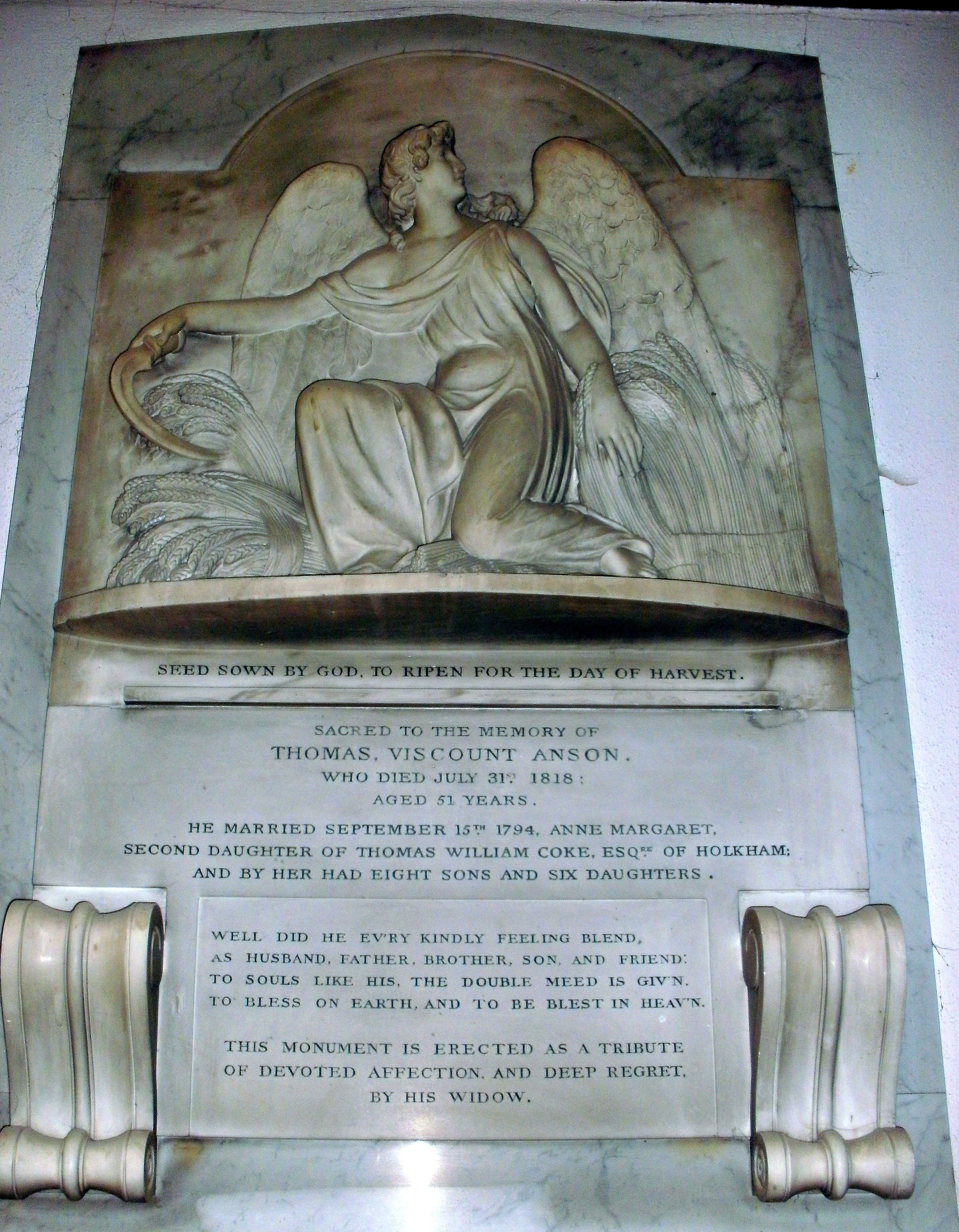
Viscount Anson's memorial at St Michael and All Angels Church in Colwich

On 15 September 1794, Anson married Lady Anne Coke, the daughter of the 1st Earl of Leicester of Holkham.

They had thirteen children:

- Hon. Thomas William Anson (1795–1854), who became 1st Earl of Lichfield.
- Hon. Anna Margaret Anson (3 Oct 1796 – 19 Aug 1882), married the 4th Earl of Rosebery.
- Hon. George Anson (1797–1857)
- Hon. Charles Littleton Anson (1799–1812, killed by an exploding gun aboard HMS Bacchante)
- Hon. William Anson (26 Feb 1801 – 19 Oct 1830)
- Georgiana Anson (b. and d. 1802)
- Hon. Henry Anson (15 May 1804 – May 1827)
- Edward Anson (21 Jun 1805 – died an infant)
- Hon. Georgiana Anson (3 Jan 1807 – 1821)
- Hon. Edward Harcourt Anson (1808–1817)
- Hon. Frances Elizabeth Anson (9 Jan 1810 – 25 Dec 1899), married (1) Hon. Charles Murray, a son of the 4th Earl of Mansfield and Mansfield, (2) Ambrose Isted.
- Hon. Frederica Sophia (24 Aug 1814 – 11 Oct 1867), married Hon. Bouverie Francis Primrose, second son of the 4th Earl of Rosebery.

Their children included Henry William Primrose (1846–1923) who became chairman of the Board of the Inland Revenue from 1899 to 1907.

- Hon. Elizabeth Jane Anson (26 Feb 1816 – 15 Sep 1894), married the 3rd Baron Waterpark.

== Death ==
He died on 31 July 1818. His papers and correspondence are held at the Staffordshire County Record Office of the Staffordshire and Stoke-on-Trent Archive Service.

Parliament of Great Britain
Preceded by Thomas Gilbert; George Anson	Member of Parliament for Lichfield; 1789–1801; With: Thomas Gilbert 1768–95, Lord Granville Leveson-Gower 1795–99, Sir John Wrottesley from 1799	Succeeded by Parliament of the United Kingdom
Parliament of the United Kingdom
Preceded by Parliament of Great Britain	Member of Parliament for Lichfield; 1801–1806; With: Sir John Wrottesley	Succeeded by Sir John Wrottesley; Sir George Anson
Peerage of the United Kingdom
New creation	Viscount Anson; 1806–1818	Succeeded by Thomas Anson
