= Hugo Marcus =

Gay Muslim writer and intellectual

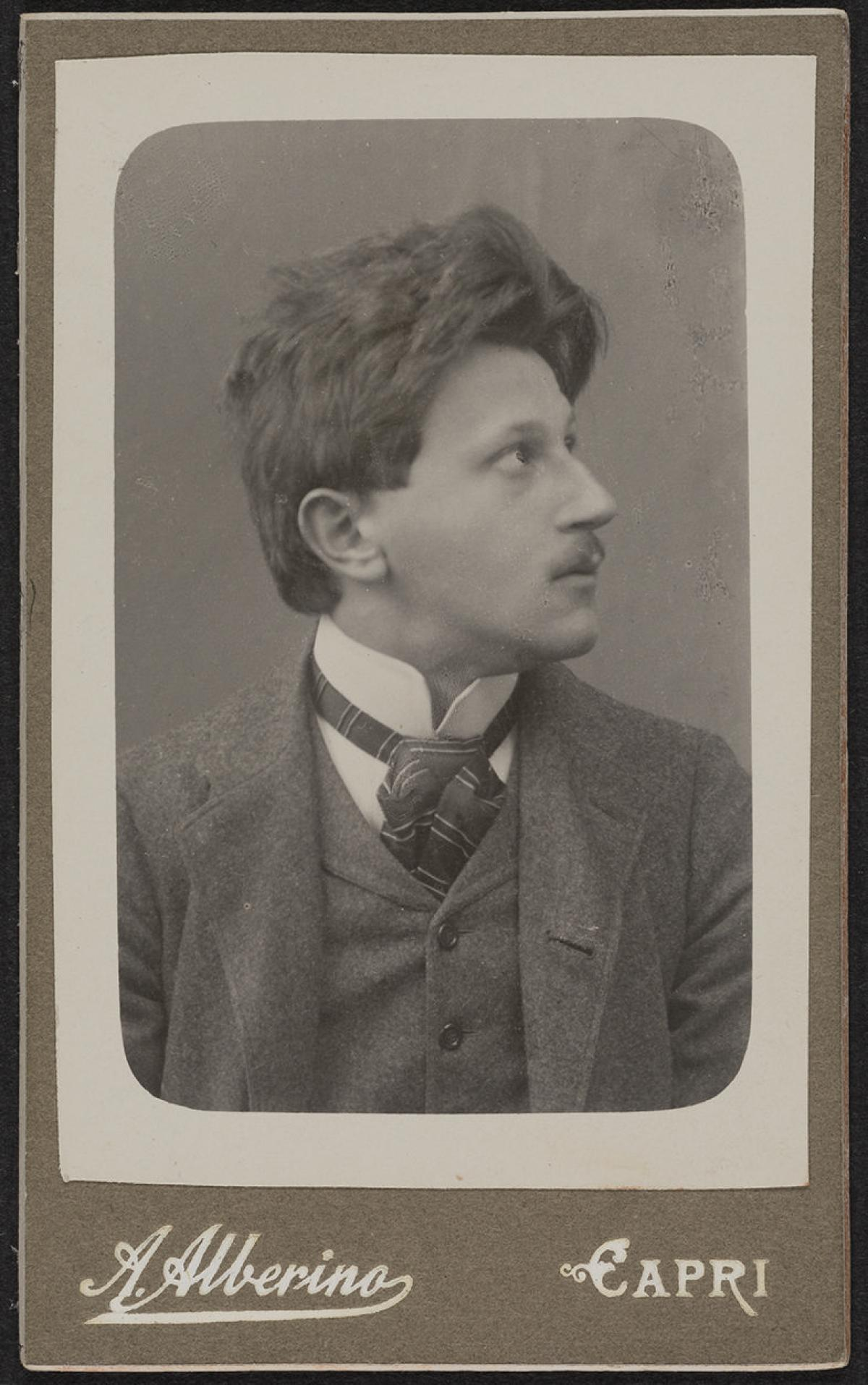
1901 Portrait of Marcus at age 21, taken at the Grand Hotel Quisisana in Capri, Italy

Hugo "Hamid" Marcus (6 July 1880 – 18 April 1966) was a Polish academic, author, teacher, and political activist.

A large portion of Marcus' writing focuses on male homoerotic relationships and his interpretations of Islam. Despite being ethnically Jewish, Marcus converted to Islam in 1931, at the age of 51, after being heavily involved in the Lahore Ahmadiyya mosque community in Berlin in the prior years. In 1938, Marcus was arrested by the Nazis for his Jewish heritage and sent to Oranienburg concentration camp, but was released a month later due to help from the Lahore Ahmadiyya community.

Marcus was an example of a Jewish convert to Islam, publishing a German translation of the Quran in 1939. Marcus' involvement in the Berlin Muslim community was considered one of the Ahmadiyya community's greatest achievements due to his insight into German language and culture.

Marcus was also highly involved in homosexual activism during his younger years, being a close associate to famous homosexual activist and sexual scientist Magnus Hirschfeld (1868–1935) and others. Behind closed doors, however, Marcus did not have an active love life and never found a partner, spending the latter half of his life almost completely alone.

== Early life ==
Hugo Marcus was born on 6 July 1880 in Posen, Poland (now Poznań) to German-Jewish parents. His mother was Cäcilie Hepner and he had brothers Otto, Richard, and Alfred. His mother was from a family of cultured wealthy merchants and his father a well-off steel manufacturer. He was a cousin to German historian Ernst Kantorowicz.

Before marrying, Marcus' mother was a musical performer and retained her affinity for music afterward, singing him and his siblings musical adaptations of Goethe's poetry as children. Marcus adored his mother. Later, when they lived apart during the war, he wrote her a letter each week and visited every other.

== Education ==
Hugo Marcus moved from his place of birth in Poland to study philosophy at the University of Berlin around 1898, where he earned his doctorate. There, he met and befriended Jewish Communist and Homosexual rights activist Kurt Hiller (1885–1972). The two worked together during World War I in various activist causes, with Marcus on the staff of Hiller's socialist journal, Das Ziel: Jahrbuch für geistige Politik (The aim: Yearbook for Spiritual Politics). He also met author and anti-war activist Armin T. Wegner (1886–1978) who remained one of Marcus' only constant and loyal friends by the end of his life. Marcus was interested in Aesthetics and wrote his dissertation about the "antinomy of the soul," believing that the human soul is rife with internal conflict and contradiction, specifically between the outward-facing orderly Apollonian part, and the internal, hidden passions of the chaotic Dionysian part. He borrowed the concepts of the Apollonian and Dionysian from Nietzsche, whom he, along with many of his peers, was strongly influenced by. Marcus' focus on conflict between uncontrollable internal desires and external restraint and sublimation reflects his struggle between his homosexuality and its repression forced upon him by Wilhelmian society, which followed him throughout his life.

Marcus also became friends with sexual scientist Magnus Hirschfeld and joined his Wissenschaftlich-humanitäres Komitee (Scientific-Humanitarian Committee), one of the first communities to advocate for homosexual rights, which Kurt Hiller became the Deputy Chairman of after Hirschfeld was forced to resign in 1929.

Marcus and Hiller were academically mentored by early sociologist and left-wing activist Georg Simmel. Simmel's influence put Hiller on a path towards a life of left-wing activism, but Marcus was not so straightforward. While Hiller was far more upfront about his sexuality, calling himself "gay" and even proposing a thousand members of the Scientific-Humanitarian Committee publicly identify themselves as homosexual to push forward the movement, Marcus avoided the word "homosexual" in his writings and never publicly identified as gay, despite the clear homoeroticism of his work.

Due to either the influence of Simmel or his historian cousin Ernst Kantorowicz, Marcus joined the George-Kreis (George Circle), a pseudo-religious group centered around poet and "prophet" Stefan George, whose work was often homoerotic in nature. The group's membership was filled with homosexual and masculinist men.

As a doctoral student, Marcus published around six philosophical writings which granted him some popularity. Their contents were similar in theme to Stephan George's work, homoetrotic in the style of pederasty, containing a superior and subordinate. He wrote about spiritual and social utopia as well, foreshadowing many of his later works regarding Islam.

When he turned 21 in 1901, Marcus visited the Island of Capri in Italy, which at the time was known for its liberating sexual looseness, especially in regard to same-sex relationships due to the Napoleonic code's elimination of anti-sodomy laws in Italy. There, he encountered wealthy German businessman Friedrich Alfred Krupp, who Marcus realized was also a homosexual and felt a special connection with, though the two never actually spoke. The following year, Krupp was outed publicly as a homosexual and shortly after committed suicide. Marcus felt he shared a special bond with Krupp due to their shared homosexuality and was shocked by his death, grieving privately. While the Krupp affair was a particularly close to Marcus personally, the media of Wilhelmian society in which he lived constantly slandered and condemned homosexuals within the upper class, accusations of "improper sexual behavior" frequently making headlines. As part of the upper class, Marcus and his family were vulnerable to the same treatment, increasing the pressure on Marcus to repress his homosexual desires to protect his family's status and reputation.

Marcus was, to his dismay, expected to eventually take on the wood-finishing business of his grandfather rather than focusing wholeheartedly on his academic studies and writing. After World War I, Poland gained independence and nationalized the Marcus' family business, freeing Hugo Marcus of his future occupational obligation and allowing him to pursue academics, but also requiring him to contribute to his family's income for the first time. He fulfilled both demands by working in private tutoring. A large portion of his clientele were Muslim Indian immigrants who came to Berlin because of favorable economic conditions. Many wanted to enroll in Berlin University, but needed a strong grasp on German language and culture to do so, a subject Marcus specialized in. This teaching role was Marcus' first introduction to the Indian Islamic community (Ahmadiyya community) in Berlin, a community in which he would later become a central part.

== Islam ==
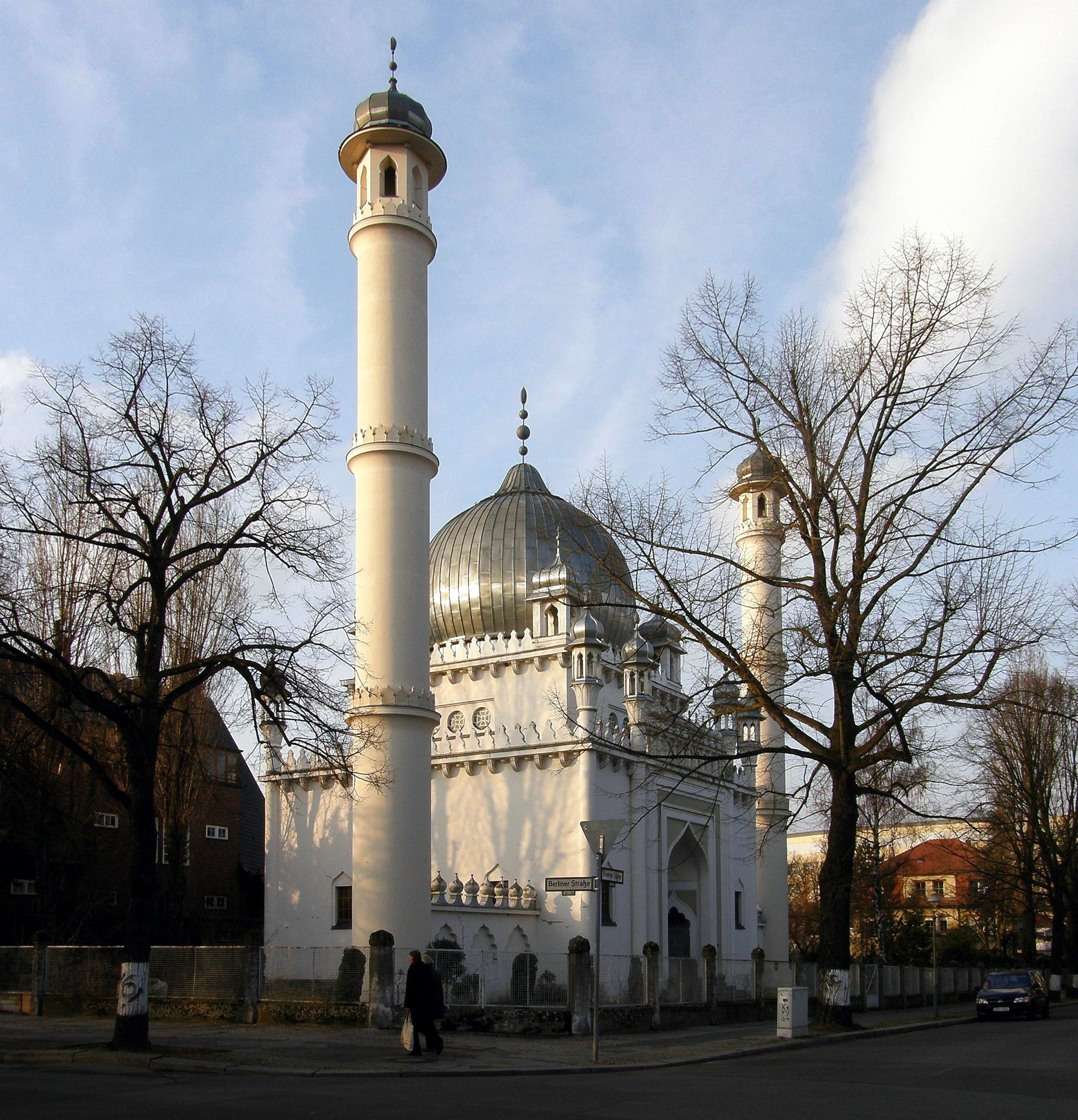
Berlin, Wilmersdorfer Mosque in 2008

When the Ahmadiyya community built the Berlin Mosque in 1923, Marcus met the Islamic missionary Sadruddin (1880–1980) who offered Marcus a permanent job educating the community's Muslim students on German language and culture, in addition to making him the editor of the mosque's journal, Die Moslemische Revue. Marcus' encounter with Indian Islamic culture opened his eyes to a new way of viewing himself and his sexuality, vastly different from the repressive Wilhelmian conception he grew up with. It allowed physical touch between men, like walking hand in hand, in addition to encouraging the type of close male bonding Marcus wrote about in many of his texts. Before British colonial power outlawed it, male homosexual relationships were even permitted in India, at least among the upper class. The new Muslim perspective helped Marcus dismantle his Nietzschean system of internal conflict, the battle between Dionysian and Apollonian within himself, and brought him some relief from his repression.

Marcus still refrained from seeking any sort of homosexual relationship, though, and instead wrote prolifically about his views on Islam. Some of these treatises he published in Die Moslemische Revue.

In addition, Marcus' misogynistic views about women seemed to strengthen after joining. He did not view women (perhaps with the exception of his mother) favorably before, but this turned more extreme in an unpublished treatise called What Does the Quran Tell Us? where he talks about the virtues of male homosexual love, reasoning that therefore women have no purpose in Islam other than to serve men.

Marcus was tasked by the Ahmadiyya community with translating the Quran into German during the 1930s, using an English version translated from Arabic by Ahmadiyya missionary Sadr ud-Din during the mid-1920s. This was considered a major accomplishment of the Ahmadiyya community in Europe, with Marcus even delaying his escape from Nazi persecution to finish the translation.

He finally converted to Islam at the age of 51 in 1931, after many years of working with and writing for the Ahmadiyya community. To reflect his conversion, Marcus changed his first name from "Hugo" to "Hamid," a shortening of the common Muslim name "Muhammad."

Marcus seemed to have a somewhat utopian or idealistic view of Islam, seeing it as more tolerant and peace-loving than other religions. Although the Shahada and first Pillar of Islam calls one to denounce all other faiths besides Islam, Marcus refused to give up his Judaism, pointing to a perhaps self-indulgent and optimistic understanding Islam.

== Persecution by the Nazis ==
In November 1938, Marcus was arrested by the Nazi regime at his mother's flat in Berlin for his Jewish heritage. He was sent to Oranienburg concentration camp, where he was held for a month, but with help from his friends at the Ahmadiyya community, he was set free. At his potential peril, Marcus remained in Berlin until July 1939, in order to finish a German translation of the Quran. He left for Switzerland immediately after it was published, bringing with him everything he had ever written (besides Das Tor dröhntzu), weighing at least 100 kilos.

Despite being one of the few Jews who were allowed to seek refuge from the Nazis in Switzerland, Marcus was forced to keep the name "Hugo Isreal Marcus," which was prescribed by the Nazis to denote his Jewish status, on his Swiss documentation.

Marcus remained in Switzerland for the rest of his life. He continued writing and publishing his work, including some love stories which he sent to the Zurich homosexual magazine Der Kreis (The Circle), which was founded by Marcus' old friend Kurt Hiller.

Most of Marcus' family was displaced or murdered in the holocaust. His cousin Else fled to New York, his aunt to British Palestine. His cousin Leonie Cahn and her husband fled to Zurich like Marcus and his mother. By the time of his mother's death in 1947, Marcus was the last of his brothers alive.

== Writings ==
Marcus was a prolific writer and his published and unpublished work spans forty whole containers, currently held in The Central Library in Zurich, Switzerland. He wrote on a daily basis since adolescence, and his work includes hundreds of stories about exalted male friendship, usually with a repressed homoerotic or homoromantic edge, thousands of aphorisms about the friction between Eros and Heroism, a dozen published books, and twenty published treatises surrounding the topic of Islam.

Marcus' writings and ideology was heavily inspired by influential German authors Friedrich Nietzsche and Johann Wolfgang von Goethe, the latter he presumed to be both gay and hold Islamic beliefs, like himself.

Marcus wrote and published throughout his entire adult life. His first published book, the novel Das Frühlingsglück (Spring Happiness), was completed in 1900, when he was 20 years old. The book follows the young boy, Guido, who forms a romantic relationship with a girl, Adeline, however he actually loves a boy, Ernst, despite the fact that the two have not meaningfully interacted. Guido's relationship with Adeline breaks down due to his love for Ernst, but rather than pursuing the other boy, Guido gives up romance altogether and lives the rest of his days alongside his mother, never seeking another woman to court.

During a time period spanning from his teens to late middle age, Marcus wrote between 700 and 800 short texts similar in essence to Das Frühlingsglück, following two boys: the extroverted Guido and shy Heinrich. The boys' names are not always consistent, and notably sometimes "Heinrich" is replaced with "I" in these texts, but they all explore like themes of homosexual desire, despair, and repression. The texts were likely written to help Marcus cope with his inability to find love and connection due to societal restraints. In 1915, Marcus compiled a large collection of his Guido and Henrich stories into the privately published and anonymous book Das Tor dröhntzu (The Gate Slams Shut). This book was not received well by Marcus' family.

Marcus' last published work, a booklet of aphorisms called Einer sucht den Freund (Looking for a Friend) was released when he was 81.
