= Chartered Institute of Arbitrators =

Professional organisation

- Founded: 1 March 1915; 111 years ago
- Type: Professional organisation
- Headquarters: 12 Bloomsbury Square, London, England; WC1A 2LP
- Region served: Worldwide
- President (2025): Professor Dr Mohamed Abdel Wahab C.Arb, FCIArb
- Patron: Nabil Elaraby, LL.M., J.S.D.
- Website: www.ciarb.org

The Chartered Institute of Arbitrators (abbreviated as CIArb) is a professional organisation representing the interests of alternative dispute resolution (ADR) practitioners. Founded on 1 March 1915, it was granted a royal charter by Queen Elizabeth II in 1979.

== History ==
The Chartered Institute of Arbitrators was founded as the Institute of Arbitrators on 1 March 1915 and became registered as a charity in the United Kingdom in 1990. It was founded as an unincorporated association by H.C. Emery (a solicitor and chartered secretary), F.M. Burr (an architect), I. W. Bullen (an accountant), A. Powells (profession unknown) and A. Stevens (a solicitor). The aim of the institute was 'to raise the status of Arbitration to the dignity of a distinct and recognised position as one of the learned professions.

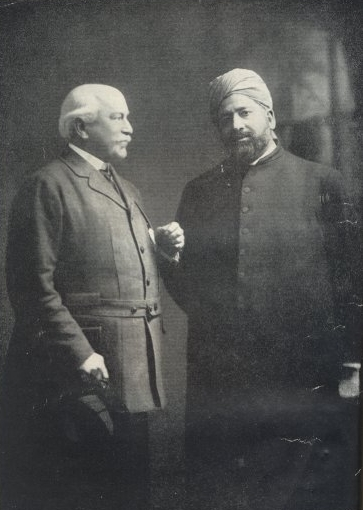
Lord Headley (left), first president of the institute, with Khwaja Kamal-ud-Din (1913).

The first secretary of CIArb was H.C. Emery, one of the founders, and the first offices were at 32 Old Jewry, London EC2. The first president, elected in June 1915, was Rowland Allanson-Winn, 5th Baron Headley, a consulting engineer. Since then there have been eight further secretaries, secretaries general or directors general and fifty-four presidents or honorary presidents.

In around 1920 the offices of the institute moved to Old Broad Street, and in April 1925 it became an incorporated body limited by guarantee. Further moves took place to Norfolk Street WC2, Bedford Square WC1, Portland Place W1 and in 1965 to Park Crescent W1. In 1975 the institute moved into premises in Cannon Street EC4, where it remained until the move to Angel Gate EC1 in 1990. Then in January 2001 it acquired the freehold of 12 Bloomsbury Square and moved in the following month.

In 1975 arbitration activities of the institute merged with the London Court of Arbitration; the institute and the London Court of Arbitration eventually demerged in 1986. The institute entered into an association with the London Chamber of Commerce and Industry and the City Corporation to create a Joint Committee of Management, on which all three bodies were equally represented.

In 1979 the institute was incorporated by Royal Charter and Bye-laws Royal Charter was granted to the institute, which set the seal on recognition of the institute as a learned body. 1981 saw the creation of the Worshipful Company of Arbitrators, ranked ninety-third in the list of City livery companies.

In July 1990 CIArb became a charitable body whose main object is to promote and facilitate the determination of disputes by arbitration and alternative means of dispute resolution, other than resolution by the courts. A number of measures to further this object were established amongst which were affording means of communication between members of the institute and others concerned with arbitration and alternative means of dispute resolution, providing training and education at all levels for those practising or wishing to practise as arbitrators and providing means for testing the qualifications of candidates for admission to professional membership of the institute by examination.

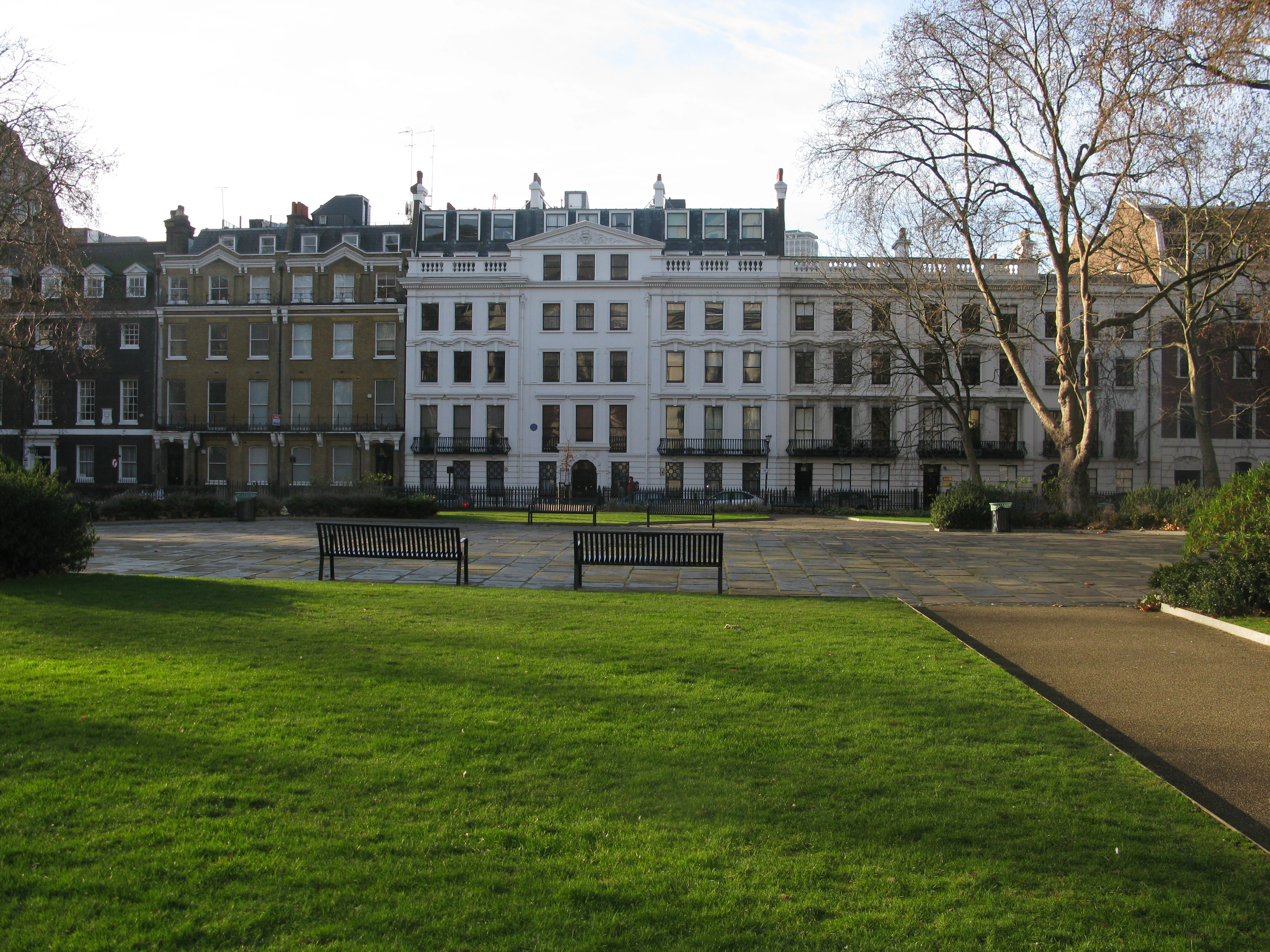
CIArb headquarters, left from the Le Cordon Bleu London, 12 Bloomsbury Square (2008)

The Royal Charter has been updated in 1999, 2005 and 2023. In 1999 a new category of member was introduced so that the membership categories are now Associate, Member and Fellow. At the same time a new qualification of Chartered Arbitrator was introduced as the highest level of qualification for an arbitrator. Many changes were made to the Royal Charter in 2005, the principal of which were the giving of a greater say in the management of the institute to members resident outside England and Wales and the replacement of the Council by a regionally elected Board of Trustees. In 2023, the Royal Charter was amended again, to allow for the appointment of up to 5 trustees, to subsume the Board of Management into the Board of Trustees and to create a new Chartered Adjudicator qualification.

In addition to its educational activities, the institute offers bespoke schemes for consumer and commercial markets for non-judicial resolution of disputes. These include the Personal Insurance Arbitration Service. The institute also offers nominating and appointing services for ad hoc arbitration, adjudication and mediation that are often used by parties in arbitration clauses as a means of selecting a single, neutral arbitrator.

== Education, training and professional qualifications ==
As a professional chartered institute, CIArb offers a range of education and vocational training courses and qualifications, from introductory to advanced levels, in the various disciplines of dispute resolution, including arbitration, mediation, and construction adjudication. CIArb offers a range of qualifications that cover the major disciplines in the field, providing public recognition of expertise in dispute resolution. CIArb also develops and publishes a variety of standards and guidelines based upon the latest thinking from leading practitioners.

CIArb runs a calendar of Continuous Professional Development (CPD) events, often attracting speakers from the profession.

== Academic and professional resources ==
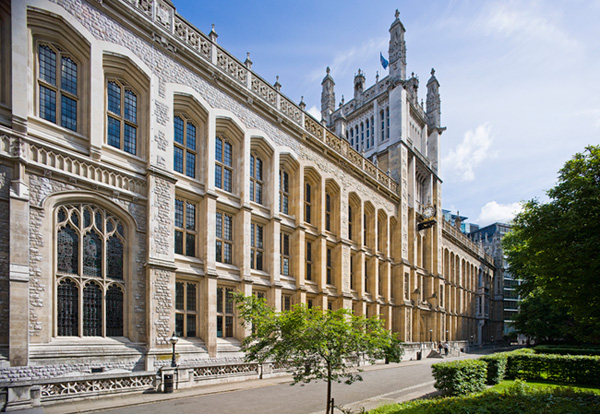
Maughan Library hosts the CIArb back library

As the professional body for dispute resolution, CIArb seeks to advance and promote research, academic thought and new professional policy and practices concerning dispute resolution as a learned society. It works closely with academic institutions and other professional bodies across the world.

CIArb provides professional information and guidance to support the professional work of its members and also helps users of dispute resolution methods.

Legal services and information include articles, case law, regulations, professional guidelines and model clauses.

Members can visit the Maughan Library in London, which now hosts the CIArb back library, and access an online bookshop with dispute resolution titles available at discounted prices.

== Membership ==
Membership of the institute can be gained through qualification or experience routes. CIArb membership embraces a wide range of occupational backgrounds and academic disciplines. CIArb provide different grades of membership to suit individual skills, knowledge and experience. The following grades of membership are offered:

- Student Member
- CIArb Associate (ACIArb)
- CIArb Member (MCIArb)
- CIArb Fellow (FCIArb)
- Chartered Arbitrator (C.Arb)

== Global community ==
As a not-for-profit, UK-registered charity, CIArb works in the public interest through an international network of 41 branches.

CIArb and its branches organize regular seminars, lectures and social meetings that address topical issues in dispute resolution and allow members—and often non-members—to come together.

=== Branches ===
==== Africa ====
Egypt, Kenya, Mauritius, Nigeria, South Africa, Zambia, Zimbabwe

==== Americas ====
Bahamas, Bermuda, Caribbean, Canada, New York, North America, Latin America, Brazil

==== Asia ====
East Asia, Malaysia, Singapore, Thailand

==== Australasia ====
Australia

==== Europe ====
Cyprus, Ireland, Europe

==== Great Britain ====
Scotland, North East, North West, East Midlands, West Midlands, East Anglia, London, South East, Southern, Thames Valley, Western Counties, Wales, Channel Islands

==== Middle East and Indian Subcontinent ====
India, Bahrain, Lebanon, Qatar, UAE (Dubai), Pakistan, Sri Lanka

== Research ==
The Research and Development department of CIArb continues to develop areas of research to meet the demands of the alternative dispute resolution (ADR) community.

The function of the research team is to provide a service to members and also to act as a research body able to react to the needs of the ADR community, whether they be governments or commercial bodies that are nonmembers of the institute.

This service is available to public and private organizations where there is a need for thought leadership in the field of private dispute resolution.

== The journal and other publications ==
The institute's journal, Arbitration, has continued to be published since its inception in 1915. Over that time the journal has contributed over 5,000 articles on arbitration and dispute resolution in its many and varied forms.

Today the journal incorporates all aspects of dispute resolving within its academic and practitioner output. With the creation of a focused research and development department, the journal now finds a home at Bloomsbury Square with a team of academically led practitioners proactively contributing to the structure and content of the publication. The research team also contributes to many other publications incorporating judicial research, academic book titles and practitioner guides.
