= Marmaduke Pickthall =

English Islamic scholar (1875–1936)

Muhammad Marmaduke Pickthall
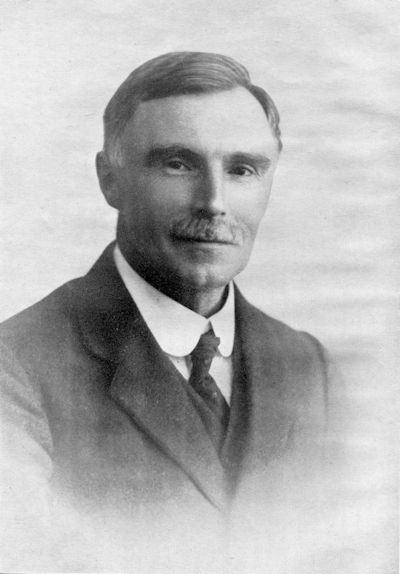
- Born: Marmaduke William Pickthall; 7 April 1875; Cambridge Terrace, London, England
- Died: 19 May 1936 (aged 61); Porthminster Hotel, St Ives, Cornwall, England
- Resting place: Brookwood Cemetery, Brookwood, Surrey, England
- Occupations: Novelist, Islamic scholar
- Known for: The Meaning of the Glorious Koran

Muhammad Marmaduke Pickthall (born Marmaduke William Pickthall; 7 April 1875 – 19 May 1936) was an English Islamic scholar noted for his 1930 English translation of the Quran, called The Meaning of the Glorious Koran. His translation of the Quran (usually anglicized as "Koran" in Pickthall's era) is one of the most widely known and used in the English-speaking world. A convert from Christianity to Islam, Pickthall was a novelist, esteemed by D. H. Lawrence, H. G. Wells, and E. M. Forster, as well as journalists, political and religious leaders. He declared his conversion to Islam in dramatic fashion after delivering a talk on 'Islam and Progress' on 29 November 1917, to the Muslim Literary Society in Notting Hill, West London.

== Biography ==
Marmaduke William Pickthall was born in Cambridge Terrace, near Regent's Park in London, on 7 April 1875, the elder of the two sons of the Reverend Charles Grayson Pickthall (1822–1881) and his second wife, Mary Hale, née O'Brien (1836–1904). Charles was an Anglican clergyman, the rector of Chillesford, a village near Woodbridge, Suffolk. The Pickthalls traced their ancestry to a knight of William the Conqueror, Sir Roger de Poictu, from whom their surname derives. Mary, of the Irish Inchiquin clan, was the widow of William Hale and the daughter of Admiral Donat Henchy O'Brien, who served in the Napoleonic Wars. Pickthall spent the first few years of his life in the countryside, living with several older half-siblings and a younger brother in his father's rectory in rural Suffolk. He was a sickly child. When about six months old, he fell very ill of measles complicated by bronchitis. On the death of his father in 1881 the family moved to London. He attended Harrow School but left after six terms. As a schoolboy at Harrow, Pickthall was a classmate and friend of Winston Churchill.

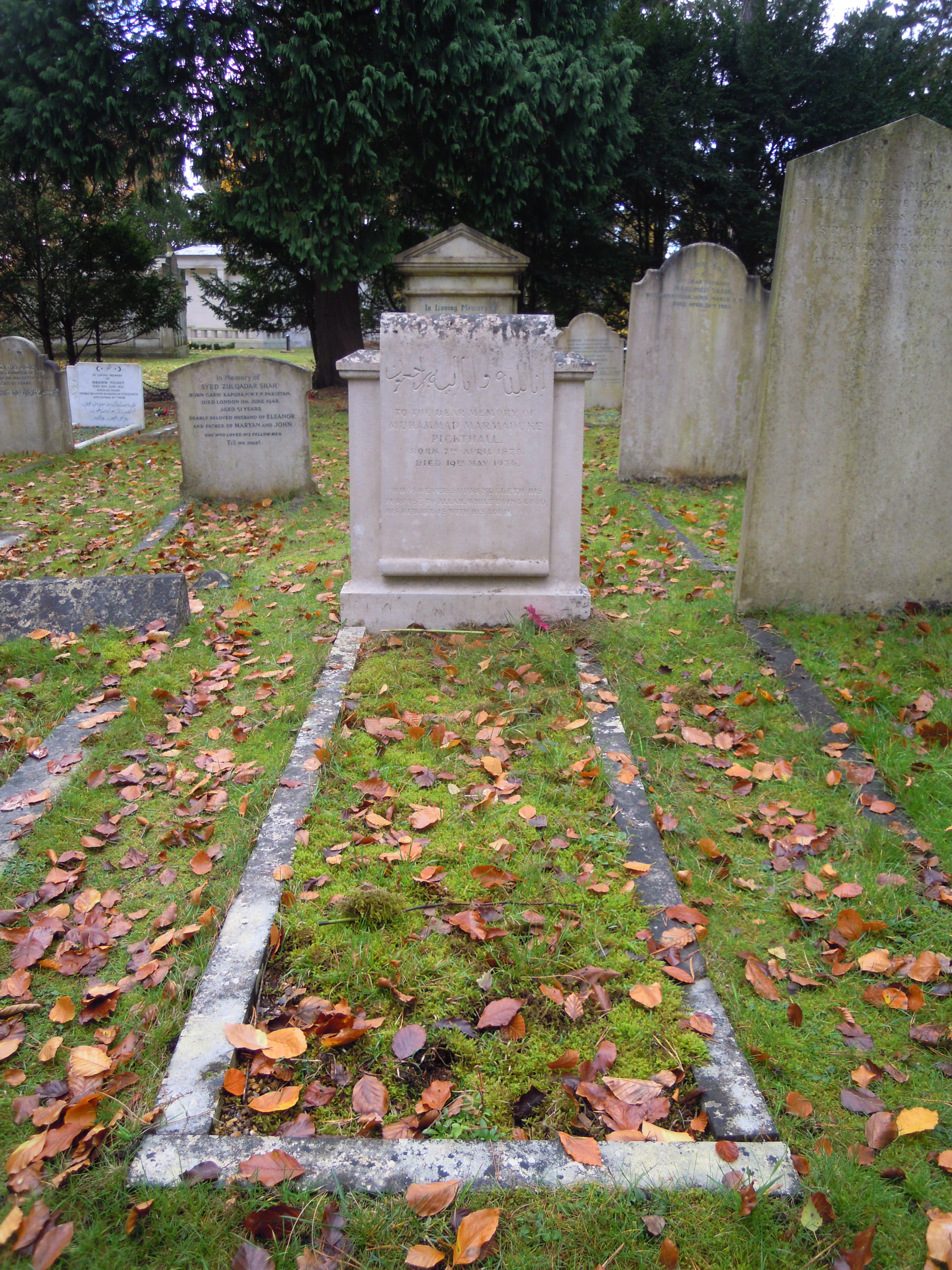
Grave of Muhammad Pickthall in Brookwood Cemetery, inscribed with a quote from Verse 2:112 of the Quran (his translation): "Whosoever surrendereth his purpose to Allah while doing good, his reward is with his Lord."

Pickthall travelled across many Eastern countries, gaining a reputation as a Middle-Eastern scholar, at a time when the institution of the Caliphate had collapsed with the Muslim world failing to find consensus on appointing a successor. Before declaring his faith as a Muslim, Pickthall was a strong ally of the Ottoman Empire. He studied the Orient, and published articles and novels on the subject. While in the service of the Nizam of Hyderabad, Pickthall published his English translation of the Quran with the title The Meaning of the Glorious Koran. The translation was authorized by the Al-Azhar University and the Times Literary Supplement praised his efforts by writing "noted translator of the glorious Quran into English language, a great literary achievement". Pickthall was conscripted in the last months of World War I and became corporal in charge of an influenza isolation hospital.

When news of the Armenian genocide reached Britain, Pickthall frequently wrote in defense of the Ottomans, writing in 1915 that the Turkish Government's decision to move the Armenian population to concentration camps was "as much with a view to their protection ... as with a view to prevent further treachery." During the war, Pickthall developed a reputation as "a rabid Turkophile", consequently denying him a position with the Arab Bureau. The role was instead given to T. E. Lawrence.

In June 1917, Pickthall gave a speech defending the rights of Palestinian Arabs, in the context of the debate over the Balfour Declaration. In November 1917, Pickthall publicly took shahada at the Woking Muslim Mission with the support of Khwaja Kamal-ud-Din. He followed this with a speech contrasting the Christian and Muslim approaches to religious law, arguing that Islam was better equipped than Christianity to handle the post-World War world.

Pickthall, who now identified himself as a "Sunni Muslim of the Hanafi school", was active as "a natural leader" within a number of Islamic organizations. He preached Friday sermons in both the Woking Mosque and in London. Some of his khutbas (sermons) were subsequently published. For a year he ran the Islamic Information Bureau in London, which issued a weekly paper, The Muslim Outlook. Pickthall and Quran translator Yusuf Ali were trustees of both the Shah Jehan Mosque in Woking and the East London Mosque.

In 1920 he went to India with his wife to serve as editor of the Bombay Chronicle. On the behest of Nizam of Hyderabad he was appointed Principal at Chadarghat High School in the State of Hyderabad in 1926. The Nizam’s Government proposed to establish a Publicity Bureau in the Hyderabad State as it appeared in the Mushir-i-Deccan on 14 June 1931, that Marmaduke Pickthall is to be appointed Publicity Officer in addition to his own duties as Principal of the Chadarghat High School. Returning to England only in 1935, a year before his death at St Ives, Cornwall.

Pickthall was buried in the Muslim section at Brookwood Cemetery in Surrey, England, where Abdullah Yusuf Ali was later buried.

== Written works ==
- All Fools – Being the Story of Some Very Young Men and a Girl (1900)
- Saïd the Fisherman (1903)
- Enid (1904)
- Brendle (1905)
- The House of Islam (1906)
- The Myopes (1907)
- Children of the Nile (short story collection) (1908)
- The Valley of the Kings (1909)
- Pot au Feu (1911)
- Larkmeadow (1912)
- The House of War (1913)
- Veiled Women (1913)
- With the Turk in Wartime (1914)
- Tales from Five Chimneys (1915)
- Knights of Araby - the story of Yemen in the 5th Islamic Century (1917)
- Oriental Encounters – Palestine and Syria (1918)
- Sir Limpidus (1919)
- The Early Hours (1921) :
- As others See us (1922)
- The Cultural Side of Islam (1927)
- The Meaning of the Glorious Koran: An Explanatory Translation (1930)

=== As editor ===
- Folklore of the Holy Land – Muslim, Christian, and Jewish (1907) (E H Hanauer)
- Islamic Culture (1927) (Magazine)

== See also ==
- Muhammad Asad
- A. Yusuf Ali
- Ali Ünal
- Rowland Allanson-Winn, 5th Baron Headley
- Henry Stanley, 3rd Baron Stanley of Alderley
- Sir Charles Edward Archibald Watkin Hamilton, 5th Baronet
- William Abdullah Quilliam
- Robert Stanley
- Timothy Winter
- Faris Glubb
- Islam in the United Kingdom
