= The Meaning of the Glorious Koran =

English translation of the Quran by Marmaduke Pickthall

The Meaning of the Glorious Quran
- Author: Marmaduke Pickthall
- Language: English
- Subject: Islam
- Genre: Religious
- Published: 1930

The Meaning of the Glorious Koran (1930) is an English-language translation of the Quran with brief introductions to the Surahs by Marmaduke Pickthall. In 1928, Pickthall took a two-year sabbatical to complete his translation of the meaning of the Quran, a work that he considered the summit of his achievement. Pickthall noted the impossibility of perfectly translating the Arabic into English, and he titled his work The Meaning of the Glorious Koran (A. A. Knopf, New York 1930). It was the first translation by a Muslim whose native language was English, and remains among the two most popular translations, the other being the work of Abdullah Yusuf Ali.

== Editions ==
- The Meaning of the Glorious Koran: An Explanatory Translation (1930) New York: Alfred A Knopf
- Everyman's Library (1993), ISBN 978-0-679-41736-1
- Amana Publications; 1st ed edition (1996), ISBN 0-915957-22-1
- Tahrike Tarsile Qur'an; 2nd edition (1999), ISBN 978-1-879402-16-4
- The Meaning of the Glorious Qur'an; New Modern English Edition with brief explanatory notes and Index of subjects; 7th Edition (2011), Published by IDCI, available at: www.idci.co.uk
- Khaled Fahmy (ed.) (2022) The Meanings of the Glorious Qur'an: An Explanatory Translation. [Istanbul:] Center for Cross-Cultural Communication, available at: www.crosscrulturalcenter.org
