= Muhammad Ali (writer) =

Pakistani Ahmadi scholar (1874 –1951)

Maulana Muhammad Ali
- محمد علي
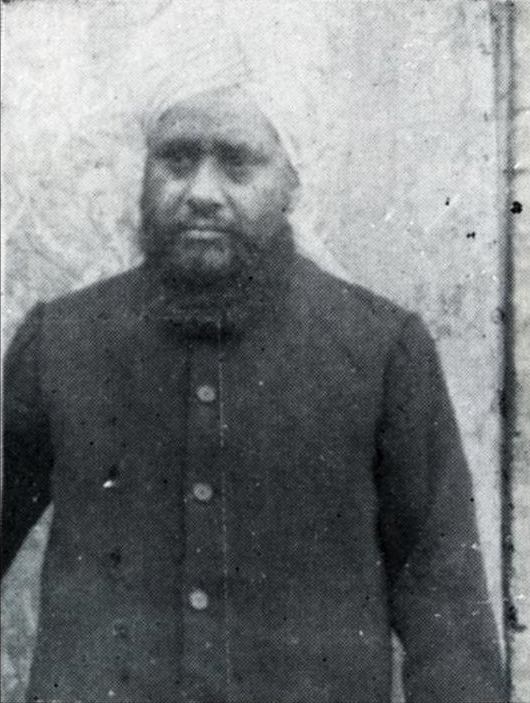
- Maulana Muhammad Ali in 1911
- Born: 1874; Murar, Kapurthala State, British India
- Died: 13 October 1951 (aged 76–77); Karachi, Pakistan
- Resting place: Lahore, Pakistan
- Occupation: Writer
- Writing career
- Language: Urdu, Arabic
- Movement: Lahore Ahmadiyya Movement

Muhammad Ali (/mɔːˈlɑːnə mʊˈhɑːməd ɑːˈliː/; Arabic: محمد علي; 1874 – 13 October 1951) was a Pakistani writer, scholar, and leading figure of the Lahore Ahmadiyya Movement. His name is often prefixed with the honorific Maulvi or Maulana.

== Biography ==
Ali was born in Murar, Kapurthala State (now in Ludhiana district, Punjab, India) in 1874. He obtained a Master of Arts in English and a Bachelor of Laws in 1899. He joined the Ahmadiyya Movement in 1897 and dedicated his life to the service of the movement as part of what he saw as a restored and pristine Islam. He died in Karachi on October 13, 1951, and is buried in Lahore.

Marmaduke Pickthall, British Muslim and translator of the Quran into English, wrote a review of Muhammad Ali's book The Religion of Islam when this book was published in 1936. The review was published in the journal Islamic Culture of Hyderabad Deccan (India), whose editor was Pickthall. In this review Pickthall wrote:

Probably no man living has done longer or more valuable service for the cause of Islamic revival than Maulana Muhammad Ali of Lahore. His literary works, with those of the late Khwaja Kamal-ud-Din, have given fame and distinction to the Ahmadiyya Movement. In our opinion the present volume is his finest work. … It is a description of Al-Islam by one well-versed in the Sunna who has on his mind the shame of the Muslim decadence of the past five centuries and in his heart the hope of the revival, of which signs can now be seen on every side.

Such a book is greatly needed at the present day when in many Muslim countries we see persons eager for the reformation and revival of Islam making mistakes through lack of just this knowledge. …

We do not always agree with Muhammad Ali’s conclusions upon minor points — sometimes they appear to us eccentric — but his premises are always sound, we are always conscious of his deep sincerity; and his reverence for the holy Quran is sufficient in itself to guarantee his work in all essentials. There are some, no doubt, who will disagree with his general findings, but they will not be those from whom Al-Islam has anything to hope in the future.

== Works ==
- Muhammad Ali (1933). History and Doctrines of the Babi Movement. Lahore, India. Archived from the original on November 9, 2020.
- Muhammad Ali (1936). The Religion of Islam. Lahore, Pakistan. Archived from the original on April 21, 2018.
- Muhammad Ali (2002). The Holy Quran: Arabic text with English translation and Commentary.
- Muhammad Ali. Bayan-ul-Quran: Urdu translation with extensive commentary. Archived from the original on September 2, 2011.
- Muhammad Ali. A Manual of Hadith. Archived from the original on April 16, 2021.
- Muhammad Ali. Muhammad, The Prophet. Archived from the original on August 13, 2020.
- Muhammad Ali. True Conception of the Ahmadiyya Movement.
- Muhammad Ali. The Split in the Ahmadiyya Movement.
