= Abdul Karim Saeed Pasha =

Abdul Karim Saeed Pasha (born 28 February 1945 in British India) is the fifth and current Emir of the Lahore Ahmadiyya Movement. In May 2007, he participated a conference in the Berlin Mosque, organized by the German and Dutch section of Ahmadiyya Anjuman. He was born in Mansehra, NWFP.
