= Muslim Literary Society =

The Muslim Literary Society was founded in 1916 and was based in Notting Hill, West London, with Koranic translator Abdullah Yusuf Ali as its president.

It is not to be confused with the American Muslim Literary Society or the Bengali Muslim Literary Society.

On 29 November 1917, the poet and novelist Marmaduke Pickthall, best known for his translation of the Koran, dramatically declared his conversion to Islam after delivering a talk on 'Islam and Progress' to the Society. There are no references to the Society after 1917.
