= Asghar Hameed =

Asghar Hameed (born 1919 in Lahore; died 14 October 2002 in Lahore) was the fourth Emir of the Lahore Ahmadiyya Movement.
