= Murar =

- Village
- Location in Punjab, India Murar (India)
- Coordinates: 31.466347°N 75.443577°E
- Country: India
- State: Punjab
- District: Kapurthala

Government
  - Type: Panchayati raj (India)
  - Body: Gram panchayat

Population (2011)
  - Total: 1,987
- Sex ratio 1051/936♂/♀

Languages
  - Official: Punjabi
  - Other spoken: Hindi
- Time zone: UTC+5:30 (IST)
- PIN: 144802
- Telephone code: 01822
- ISO 3166 code: IN-PB
- Vehicle registration: PB-09
- Website: kapurthala.gov.in

Murar is a village in Kapurthala district of Punjab State, India. It is located 13 kilometres (8.1 mi) from Kapurthala, which is both the district and sub-district headquarters. The village is administrated by a Sarpanch, who is an elected representative.

== Demography ==
According to the 2011 Census of India, Murar has 412 houses with a total population of 1,987 persons of which 1,051 are male and 936 females. The Literacy rate of Murar is 83.98%, higher than the state average of 75.84%. The population of children in the age group 0–6 years is 258 which is 12.98% of the total population. Child sex ratio is approximately 830, lower than the state average of 846.

== Population data ==
Particulars	Total	Male	Female
Total No. of Houses	412	-	-
Population	1,987	1,051	936
Child (0–6)	258	141	117
Schedule Caste	334	174	160
Schedule Tribe	0	0	0
Literacy	83.98 %	88.02 %	79.49 %
Total Workers	631	566	65
Main Worker	590	0	0
Marginal Worker	41	29	12
