= Rowland Allanson-Winn, 5th Baron Headley =

British peer, Muslim and boxing enthusiast

The Lord Headley
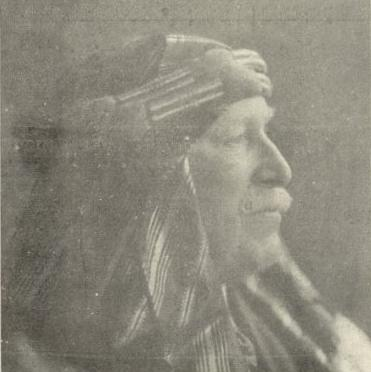
- Born: Rowland George Allanson Allanson-Winn; 19 January 1855; London, England
- Died: 22 June 1935 (aged 80); Codford, Wiltshire, England
- Burial place: Brookwood Cemetery United Kingdom of Great Britain and Ireland (-12 April 1927) Irish Free State
- Education: Bachelor of Arts
- Alma mater: Trinity College, Cambridge, King's College, London
- Occupations: Muslim scholar
- Organization: Institution of Civil Engineers
- Family: Baron Headley

Rowland George Allanson Allanson-Winn, 5th Baron Headley (19 January 1855 – 22 June 1935), also known as Shaikh Rahmatullah al-Farooq, was an Irish peer and a prominent convert to Islam who was also one of the leading members of the Woking Muslim Mission, alongside Khwaja Kamal-ud-Din. He also presided over the British Muslim Society for some time.

== Biography ==
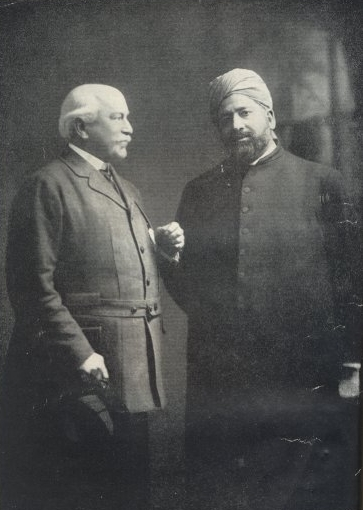
Lord Headley with Khwaja Kamal-ud-Din

Rowland George Allanson Allanson-Winn was born in London and educated at Westminster School and Trinity College, Cambridge University. He then entered Middle Temple before commencing studies at King's College London. He subsequently became a civil engineer by profession, a builder of roads in India, and an authority on the protection of intertidal zones.

He was an enthusiastic practitioner of boxing, as well as other arts of self-defence, and in 1890 co-authored, with C. Phillipps-Wolley, the classic Broad-sword and Singlestick (1890). He was solo author of Boxing (1889) in the same All-England Series (introduced by the boxer Bat Mullins), which was reprinted in 2006. In 1899, he married Teresa Johnson, daughter of William H. Johnson, former Wazir-wazirat (governor) of Ladakh (Jammu and Kashmir), India. She died in 1919.

Headley converted to Islam on 16 November 1913 and adopted the Muslim name of Shaikh Rahmatullah al-Farooq. In 1914, he established the British Muslim Society. He was the author of several books on Islam, including A Western Awakening to Islam (1914) and Three Great Prophets of the World. He was a widely travelled man and twice performed the Hajj.

He inherited his peerage from his cousin in 1913. In 1921, he married the Australian author Barbara Baynton. He became bankrupt in 1922. He was offered the throne of Albania in 1925, along with $500,000 and $50,000 per year but refused it, at which point Lady Headley returned to Melbourne, where she died in 1929. From 1929 Headley owned and lived at Ashton Gifford House near the village of Codford in Wiltshire. His widow Lady Catherine Headley continued to live at the property until 1940. He is buried in the Muslim section of Brookwood Cemetery.

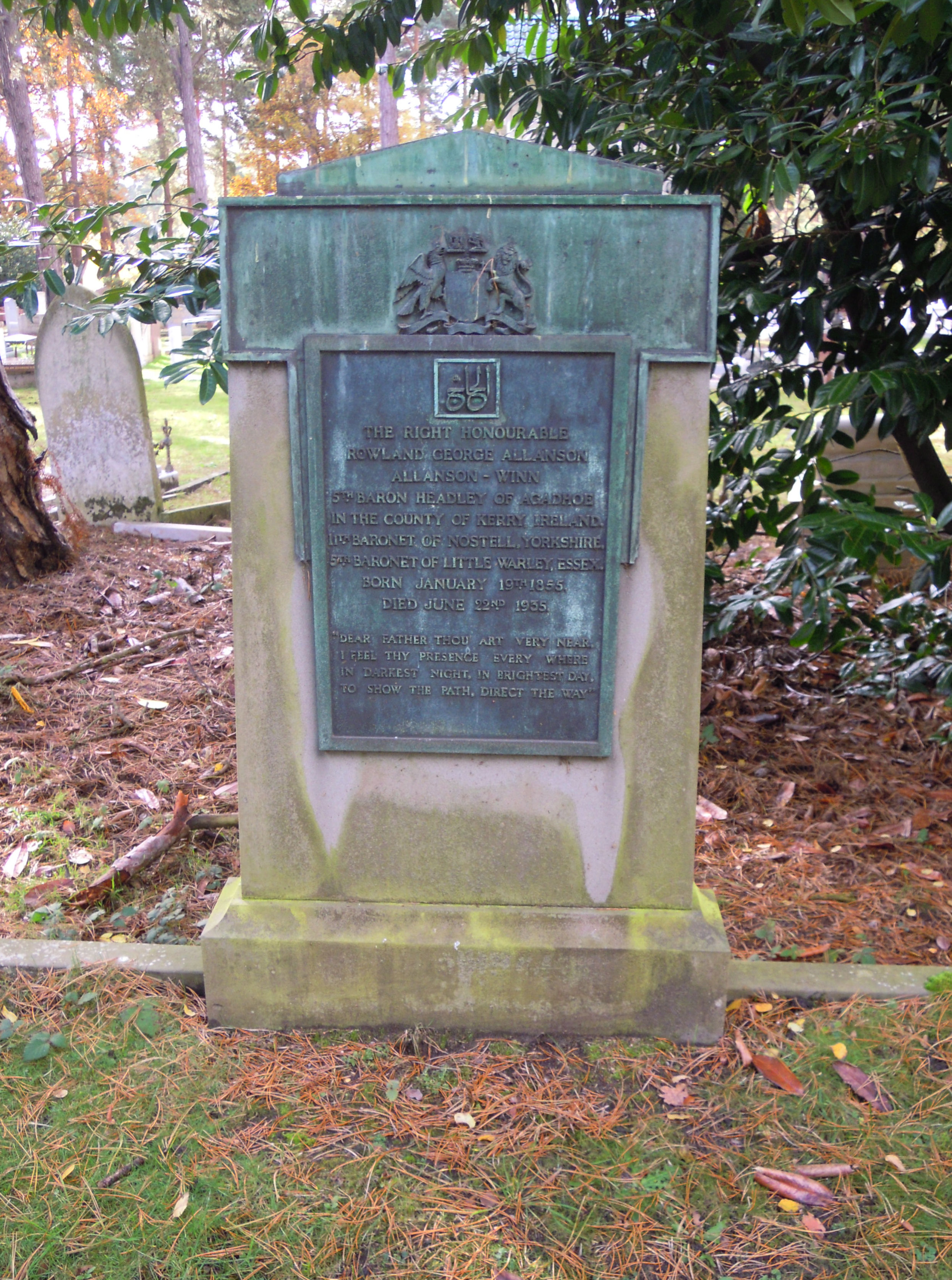
Allanson-Winn's grave in Brookwood Cemetery

=== Armenian genocide denial ===
Baron Headley was an early denier of the Armenian genocide. Along with other Turkophiles, Headley defended the Turks when news of Armenian massacres, which he both justified and denied, had reached Europe.

== See also ==
- Sir Charles Edward Archibald Watkin Hamilton, 5th Baronet
- Henry Stanley, 3rd Baron Stanley of Alderley
- William Abdullah Quilliam
- Marmaduke Pickthall
- Faris Glubb
- Timothy Winter
- Robert Reschid Stanley

Peerage of Ireland
Preceded by Charles Allanson-Winn	Baron Headley; 1913–1935	Succeeded by Rowland Allanson-Winn
