= Khwaja Kamal-ud-Din =

Islamic scholar and author (1870–1932)

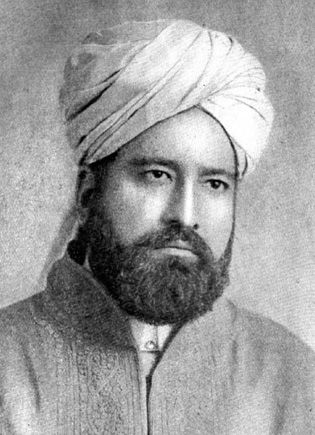
Khwaja Kamal-ud-Din

Khwaja Kamal-ud-Din (1870 – December 28, 1932) was a prominent figure of the early Ahmadiyya movement and the author of numerous works about Islam.

== Life ==
Khwaja Kamal-ud-Din was born in Punjab, India in 1870. His grandfather, Abdur Rashid, a poet, was at one time chief Muslim Judge of Lahore during the Sikh period. Kamal-ud-Din was educated at the Forman Christian College, Lahore where he was drawn to Christianity, but he was later exposed to the writings of Mirza Ghulam Ahmad, the founder of the Ahmadiyya movement, and experienced a renewed devotion to Islam. In 1893, he joined the movement and became a close disciple of Ghulam Ahmad,

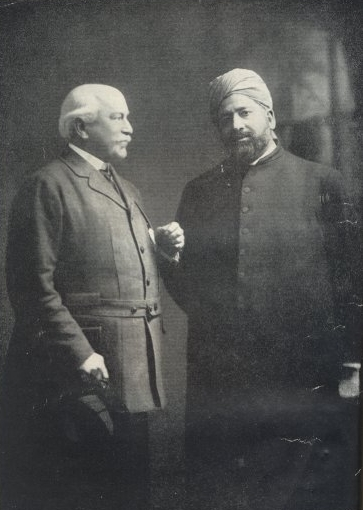
Khwaja Kamal-ud-Din with Lord Headley

Kamal-ud-Din worked as a lecturer and then as principal of Islamia College, Lahore. After graduating in law in 1898, he started a legal practice in Peshawar. In 1912 he travelled to England on behalf of a client and was instructed by Hakeem Noor-ud-Din, the first caliph (successor) to Ghulam Ahmad, to try to get the disused Shah Jahan Mosque re-opened. In London, Kamal-ud-Din met with other Muslims and worked to repair and re-open the mosque. Here he founded the Woking Muslim Mission and Literary Trust and a journal, The Islamic Review.

Kamal-ud-Din ended his legal career in 1912, and devoted his life to the propagation of non-denominational Islam in Britain. He made several long visits to England and toured other countries in Europe, Africa, and Asia, including his home country of India, delivering lectures on Islam. In 1923, he performed his second Hajj in the company of close friend Lord Headley, a British convert. The same year, he was also elected member of the League of Nations Union. Following the split in the Ahmadiyya movement in 1914, Kamal-ud-Din aligned himself with the Lahore Ahmadiyya Movement under Muhammad Ali and declared that they did not believe in any prophet after Prophet Mohammad. The split and disagreement over the declaration of prophet hood created an unmendable breach between the original Ahmadiyya party and the Lahore Ahmadiyya Movement. In 1920, Kamal-ud-Din toured Southeast Asia where, through public discourses, won the confidence of some Indonesian Muslims. He delivered a number of speeches in Surabaya and Batavia which attracted headlines in several leading newspapers.

He is buried in the Ahmadiyya Plot at Miani Sahib Cemetery in Lahore.

== Literary work ==
Below is a partial list of English books by Khwaja Kamal-ud-Din, which can be read online: (Urdu books by Khwaja Kamal-ud-Din are also accessible online.)

- Al-Islam
- Ethics of War
- The Existence of God
- Five Pillars of Islam
- God and His Attributes
- The Great Revolution
- The Holy Quran and the Bible
- Introduction to the Study of the Holy Quran
- Islam and Christianity
- Islam and Civilisation
- Islam & Other Religions
- Islam to East and West
- Jesus — An Ideal of Godhead and Humanity
- Muhammad the Most Successful Prophet
- Mysticism in Islam
- The Problem of Human Evolution
- The Quran a Miracle
- A Running Commentary on the Holy Quran
- The Sources of Christianity
- The Status of Women in World Religions and Civilisations
- The Strength of Islam
- Study for an Atheist
- Study of Islam
- Sufeism in Islam
- Unity of the Human Race
- The Vicegerent of God on Earth
- Woman from Judaism to Islam
- Worship and Sacrificialism
