= Abdullah Yusuf Ali =

Indian-British barrister (1872-1953)

Abdullah Yusuf Ali CBE FRSA FRSL

Personal life
- Born: 14 April 1872 Bombay, Bombay Presidency, British India
- Died: 10 December 1953 (aged 81) Fulham, London, England
- Occupation: Barrister

Religious life
- Religion: Sunni Islam
- Jurisprudence: Hanafi
- Movement: Modernism

Senior posting
- Influenced by: Syed Ahmad Khan, Badruddin Tyabji, Syed Ameer Ali

Abdullah Yusuf Ali (/ɑːˈliː/; 14 April 1872 – 10 December 1953) was an Indian-British barrister who wrote a number of books about Islam, including an exegesis of the Qur'an. A supporter of the British war effort during World War I, Ali received the CBE in 1917 for his services to that cause. He died in London in 1953.

== Early life ==
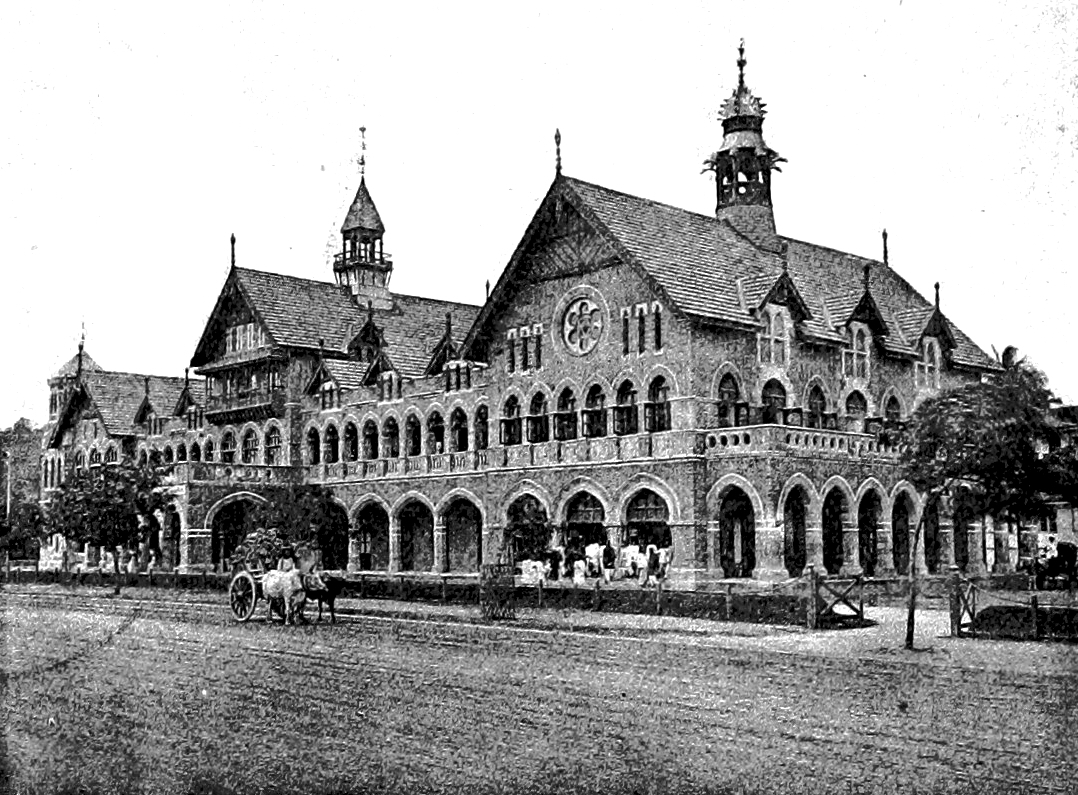
Ali studied at Wilson College in Bombay, shown here in 1893

Ali was born in Bombay, British India, the son of Yusuf Ali Allahbuksh (died 1891), also known as Khan Bahadur Yusuf Ali. On his retirement, he gained the title Khan Bahadur for public service. As a child, Abdullah Yusuf Ali attended the Anjuman Himayat-ul-Islam school and later studied at the missionary school Wilson College, both in Bombay. He also received a religious education and eventually could recite the entire Qur'an from memory. He spoke both Arabic and English fluently. He concentrated his efforts on the Qur'an and studied the Qur'anic commentaries beginning with those written in the early days of Islamic history. Ali took a first class Bachelor of Arts degree in English Literature at the University of Bombay in January 1891 aged 19 and was awarded a Presidency of Bombay Scholarship to study at the University of Cambridge in England.

Ali first went to Britain in 1891 to study law at St John's College, Cambridge and after graduating BA and LL.B in 1895 he returned to India in the same year with a post in the Indian Civil Service (ICS), later being called to the Bar in Lincoln's Inn in 1896 in absentia. He received his MA and LL.M in 1901. He married Teresa Mary Shalders (1873–1956) at St Peter's Church in Bournemouth in 1900, and with her he had three sons and a daughter: Edris Yusuf Ali (1901–1992), Asghar Bloy Yusuf Ali (1902–1971), Alban Hyder Yusuf Ali (1904–), and Leila Teresa Ali (1906–). His wife and children settled variously in Tunbridge Wells, St Albans and Norwich while Ali returned to his post in India. He returned to Britain in 1905 on a two-year leave from the ICS and during this period he was elected a Fellow of the Royal Society of Arts and the Royal Society of Literature. Ali first came to public attention in Britain after he gave a lecture at the Royal Society of Arts in London in 1906, organised by his mentor Sir George Birdwood. Another mentor was Lord James Meston, formerly Lieutenant Governor of the United Provinces, who, when he was made Finance Member of the Government of India appointed Ali to positions in various districts in India which also involved two short periods as acting Under Secretary (1907) and then Deputy Secretary (1911–12) in the Finance Department of the Government of India.

== Family and career ==
Abdullah Yusuf Ali in 1911

Khizar Humayun Ansari, his biographer on the Oxford Dictionary of National Biography, wrote of Ali:

Abdullah Yusuf Ali belonged to the group of Indian Muslims from professional families who were concerned with rank and status. In pursuit of his aspiration for influence, deference, if not outright obsequiousness, became a central feature of his relationship with the British. During the formative phase of his life he mingled mainly in upper-class circles, assiduously cultivating relations with members of the English élite. He was particularly impressed by the apparently genteel behaviour and cordiality of those with whom he associated, and, as a result, became an incorrigible Anglophile. His marriage to Teresa Shalders according to the rites of the Church of England, his hosting of receptions for the good and the great, his taste for Hellenic artefacts and culture and fascination for its heroes, his admiration for freemasonry in India as a way of bridging the racial and social divide, and his advocacy of the dissemination of rationalist and modernist thought through secular education were all genuine attempts to assimilate into British society.

His constant travelling between India and Britain took its toll on his marriage and his wife Teresa Mary Shalders was unfaithful to him and gave birth to an illegitimate child in 1910, causing him to divorce her in 1912 and gaining custody of their four children, whom he left with a governess in England. However, his children rejected him and on future visits to London during the 1920s and 1930s he stayed at the National Liberal Club. In 1914 Ali resigned from the ICS and settled in Britain where he became a Trustee of the Shah Jehan Mosque in Woking and in 1921 became a Trustee of the fund to build the East London Mosque. With the outbreak of World War I, unlike many Muslims in Britain who felt uncomfortable with supporting the British war effort against fellow Muslims of the Ottoman Empire, Ali was an enthusiastic supporter of the Indian contribution to the war effort, to that end writing articles, giving public speeches and undertaking a lecture tour of Scandinavia and was appointed a CBE in 1917 for his services to that cause. In the same year he joined the staff of the School of Oriental Studies as a lecturer in Hindustani.

He married Gertrude Anne Mawbey (1895–1984) in 1920, and she having taken the Muslim name 'Masuma' returned with him to India to escape the harassment the couple suffered from Ali's children from his first marriage, who resented him and his new wife. In his will Ali specifically mentioned his second son Asghar Bloy Yusuf Ali who "has gone so far as to abuse, insult, vilify and persecute me from time to time".

With Mawbey he had a son, Rashid (born 1922/3), but this marriage too ended in failure. He was a respected intellectual in India and Sir Muhammad Iqbal recruited him to be the Principal of Islamia College in Lahore, serving from 1925 to 1927 and again from 1935 to 1937. He was also a Fellow and syndic of the University of the Punjab (1925–8 and 1935–9) and a member of the Punjab University Enquiry Committee (1932–33). Among his publications were Muslim Educational Ideals (1923), Fundamentals of Islam (1929), Moral Education: Aims and Methods (1930), Personality of Man in Islam (1931), and The Message of Islam (1940). However, his best known scholarly work is his translation into English and commentary of the Qur'an, the Holy Qur'an: Text, Translation and Commentary (1934–8; revised edition 1939–40), which remains one of the two most widely used English versions (the other being the translation by Marmaduke Pickthall). He served on the Indian delegation to the League of Nations Assembly in 1928.

During this period, he converted from Shia Islam (in the Dawoodi Bohra branch) to Sunni Islam, adopting the Hanafi school of jurisprudence.

== Later years ==
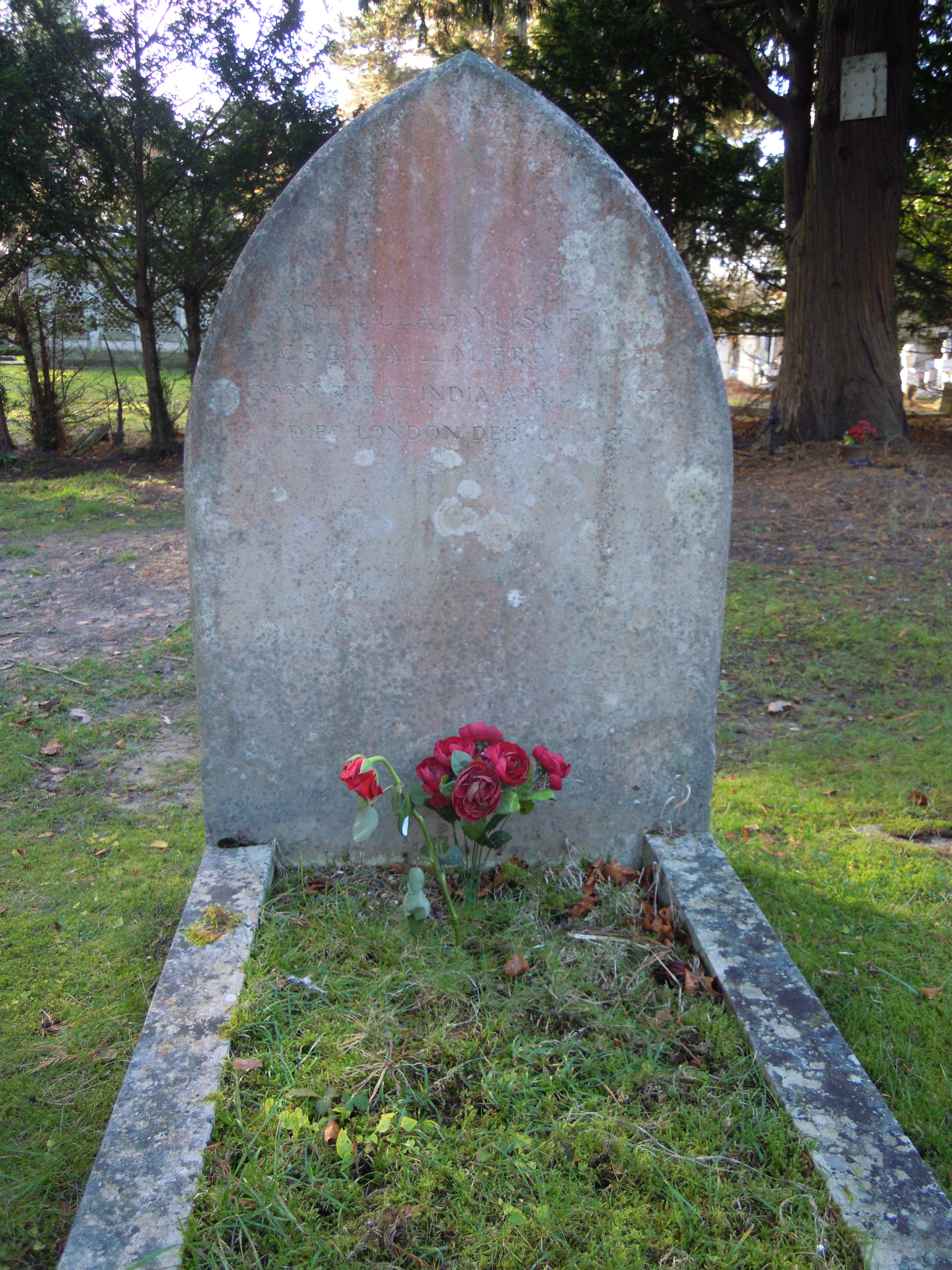
Grave of Abdullah Yusuf Ali in Brookwood Cemetery

In December 1938 while on tour to promote his translation, Ali helped to open the Al-Rashid Mosque, the third mosque in North America, in Edmonton, Alberta, Canada. In 1947 Ali was among many Indians who returned to India after Independence to take up political posts. However, for him the move was not a success and he returned to London where he became increasingly frail in mind and body, living in isolation ignored by both his family and the British establishment he had previously associated with. Of no fixed abode, Ali spent most of the last decade of his life either living in the National Liberal Club, in the Royal Commonwealth Society or wandering about the streets of London and living in poverty despite having £20,578 16s 3d in the bank. On 9 December 1953 Ali was found destitute and in a bewildered condition in a doorway in Westminster by the police who took him to Westminster Hospital. He was discharged the following day and was taken in by a London County Council home for the elderly in Dovehouse Street in Chelsea. Here he suffered a heart attack on 10 December and was rushed to St Stephen's Hospital in Fulham where he died alone the same day.

No relatives claimed the body but Ali was known to the Pakistan High Commission; they arranged his funeral and burial in the Muslim section at Brookwood Cemetery near Woking.

== Ali's Quran translation ==
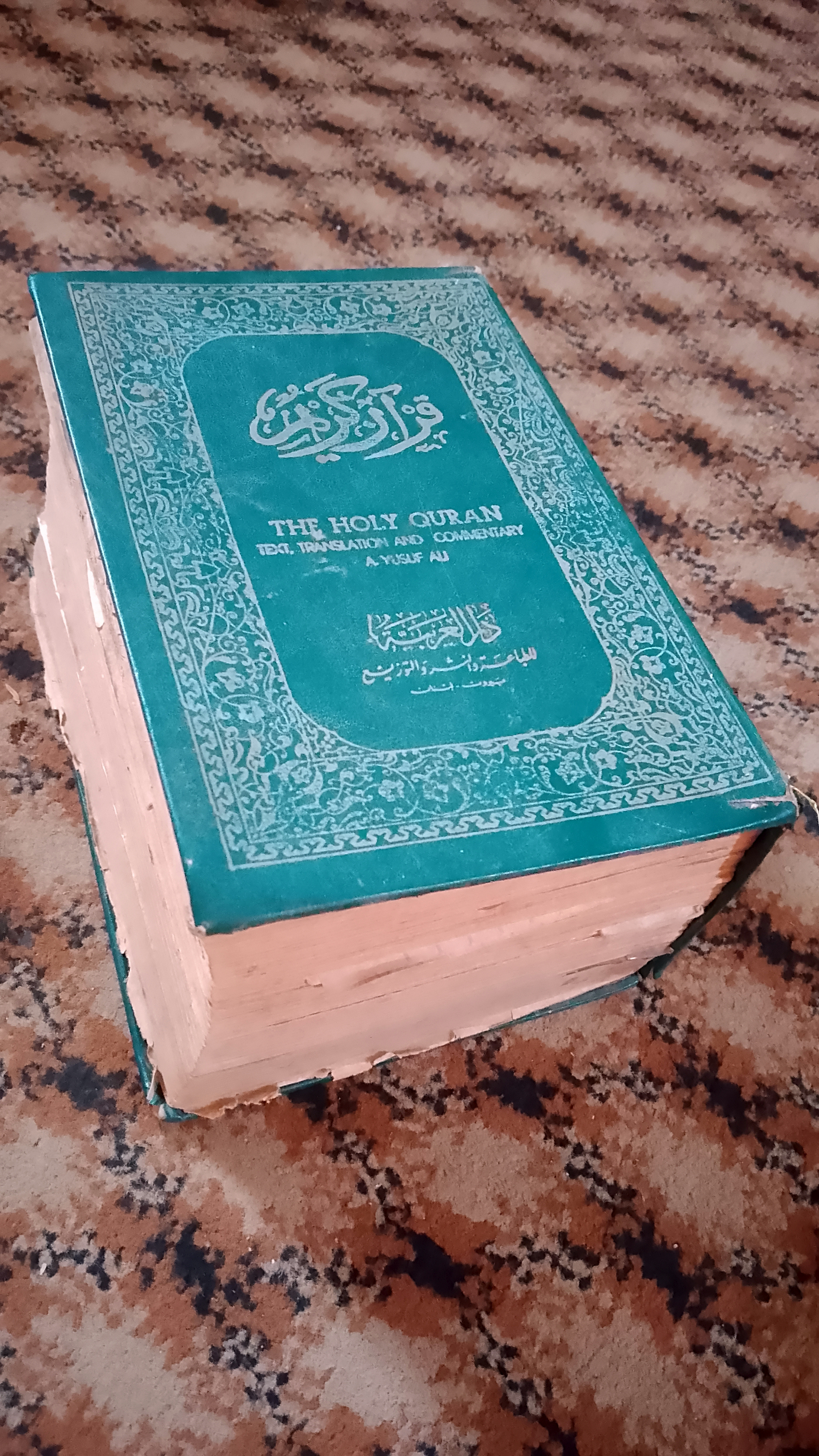
'The Holy Quran' complete Quran English translation of A. Yusuf Ali

There have been 30 printed versions of his Quran translation. In Saudi Arabia, the state-sponsored Presidency of Islamic Researches, has modified the original Yusuf Ali translation. The Ahlul Bayt Digital Islamic Library Project, whose "particular emphasis [is] on the Twelver Shi'ah Islamic school of thought", has analysed printings of Ali's translations to ascertain whether they have maintained Ali's understandings of the original Arabic text. They have determined there have been changes.
