= Lahore Ahmadiyya Movement =

Separatist group within the Ahmadiyya movement

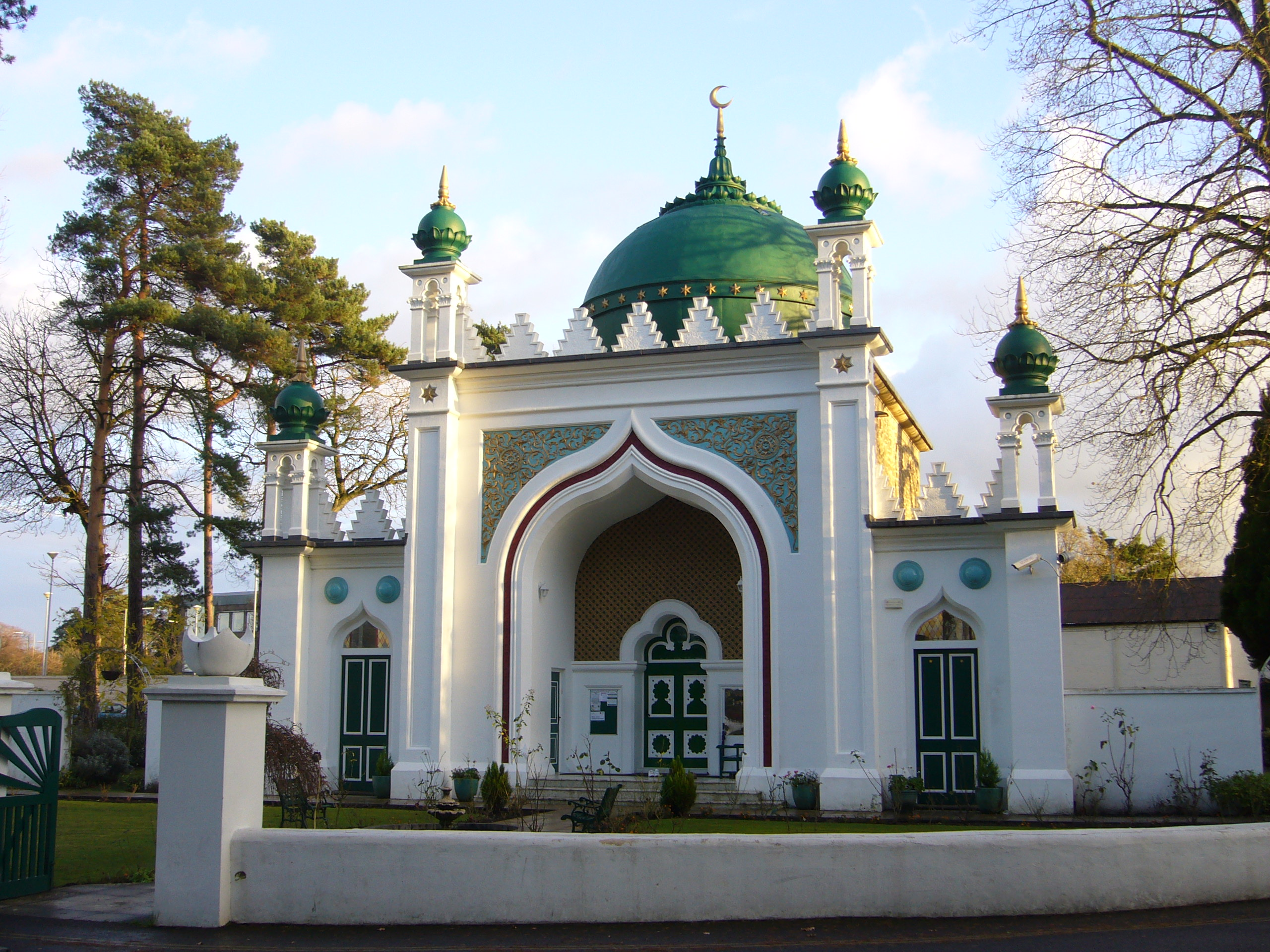
The Shah Jahan Mosque in Woking, temporarily run by the “Lahore Ahmadiyya Movement” from 1914 until the mid-1960s, remained the main centre of Islam in Britain throughout the early 20th century.

The Lahore Ahmadiyya Movement for the Propagation of Islam, (Urdu: احمدیہ انجمنِ اشاعتِ اسلام لاہور, romanized: Aḥmadiyyah Anjuman-i Ishāʿat-i Islām Lahore) is a separatist group within the Ahmadiyya movement that formed in 1914 as a result of ideological and administrative differences following the demise of Hakim Nur-ud-Din, the first Caliph after Mirza Ghulam Ahmad. Members of the Lahore Ahmadiyya movement are referred to by the majority group as ghayr mubāyi'īn ("non-initiates"; "those outside of allegiance" to the caliph) and are also known colloquially as Lahori Ahmadis.

Adherents of the Lahore Ahmadiyya movement believe Ghulam Ahmad to be a Mujaddid (reformer) and also affirm his status as the promised Messiah and Mahdi, but diverge from the main Ahmadiyya position in understanding his prophetic status to be of a Sufistic or mystical rather than theologically technical nature. Moreover, adherents of the Lahore Ahmadiyya movement do not profess allegiance to the Ahmadiyya Caliphate and are administered, instead, by a body of people called the Anjuman (Council), headed by an Amīr (President).

According to estimates from the Immigration and Refugee Board of Canada and author Simon Ross Valentine, there are between 5,000 and 10,000 Lahori Ahmadis in Pakistan and as many as 30,000 worldwide, thereby representing less than 0.2% of the total Ahmadiyya population. Similar to the 'Qadiani' Ahmadis, the 'Lahori' Ahmadis hold annual conferences or conventions called jalsas where community updates, aims, topics of interest, and challenges are discussed and emphasised to help direct policy-planning goals and initiatives for the respective groups or jamaats.

== History ==
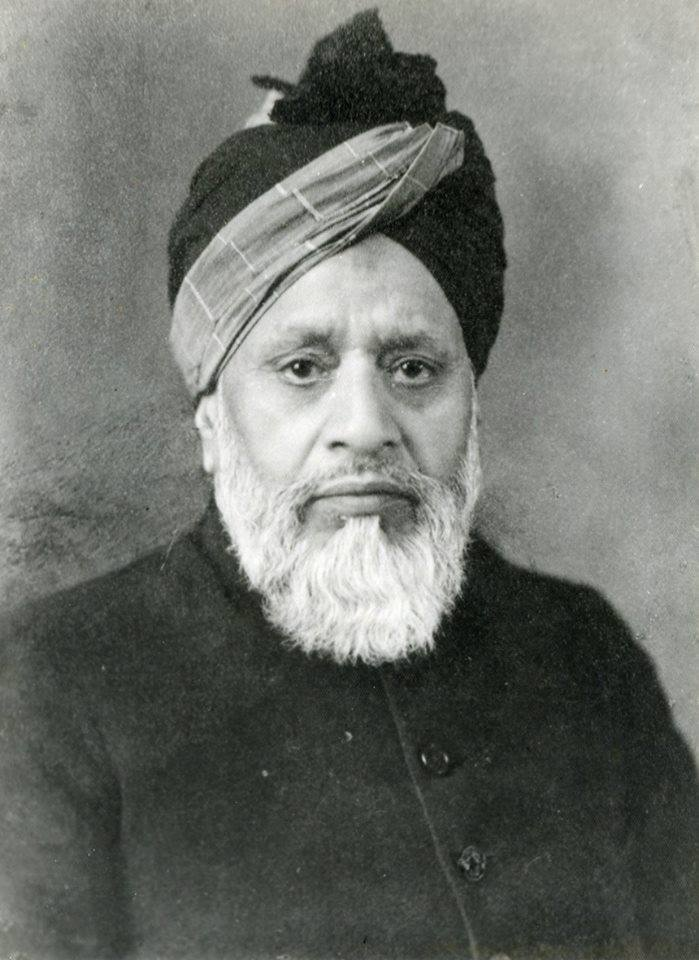
Maulana Muhammad Ali led the Lahore Ahmadiyya Movement as Amīr from 1914 to 1951

Soon after the death in 1914 of Hakim Nur-ud-Din, Ghulam Ahmad's first successor, Bashir-ud-Din Mahmud Ahmad, Ghulam Ahmad's son, was chosen in Qadian at the age of 25 to lead the movement as his second successor. However, a group, which included some of the movement's senior figures, led by Maulana Muhammad Ali, opposed his succession and refrained from pledging their allegiance to him, eventually leaving Qadian and relocating to Lahore. Muhammad Ali and his supporters' differences with Mahmud Ahmad centred mainly upon the nature of Ghulam Ahmad's prophethood—and consequentially the status of Muslims who did not accept him— as well as the form the leadership should take within the movement, viz. the relative authority of the successor (or khalīfa) and the Central Ahmadiyya Council (Anjuman). Although a clash of personalities between the dissenters and Mahmud Ahmad has also been postulated owing to the latter's relative youth, inexperience and poor academic background. The disputes surrounding these, and other related issues, eventually led to a veritable secession and the formation of the Lahore Ahmadiyya Movement.

Adopting a position more congruent with the mainstream of Sunni Islam regarding the issues of dispute, Muhammad Ali led the Lahore Ahmadiyya Movement as Amīr (President) from 1914 until his death in 1951. Since then it has been led by four Amīrs, the current being Abdul Karim Saeed Pasha. Relative to the Ahmadiyya Muslim Community, some mainstream Muslim opinion towards the Lahore Ahmadiyya Movement and its literature has been more accepting, with some Orthodox Sunni scholars considering the members of the Lahore Ahmadiyya Movement as Muslims. Notwithstanding, the group was subsumed within Pakistan's anti-Ahmadi laws declaring Ahmadis to be non-Muslims and prohibiting them from any public expression of the Islamic faith.

== Difference in viewpoints ==
=== On prophethood ===
Ahmadis universally concur in the belief that Ghulam Ahmad was both the promised Mahdi and Messiah foretold by Muhammad to appear in the end times, and that his prophetic qualities were neither independent nor separable from those of Muhammad. What this entailed theologically, however, became an issue of contention within the early Ahmadiyya movement. Muhammad Ali held that the type of prophecy described by Ghulam Ahmad in reference to himself did not make him a prophet in the technical sense of the word as used in Islamic terminology, amounted to nothing more than sainthood (walāya) and that Islamic mystics preceding Ghulam Ahmad had similarly described experiences of prophecy within Islam in the context of their relationship with Muhammad. Unlike the majority Muslim belief which expects the physical return of Jesus, the Lahore Ahmadiyya affirm the absolute cessation of prophethood, and believe that no prophet can appear after Muhammad, neither a past one like Jesus, nor a new one.

In contrast, Mahmud Ahmad posited that Ghulam Ahmad's messianic claim and role were qualitatively distinct to the claims of the saints preceding him in Islam and that his prophetic status, though completely subservient to Muhammad, being a mere reflection of his own prophethood and not legislating anything new, still made him technically a prophet irrespective of the type of prophethood or the adjectives added to qualify it. Accordingly, the Ahmadiyya Muslim Community believes that prophecy gifted as a result of perfect obedience and self-effacement in devotion to Muhammad does not infringe upon the finality of his prophetic mission, though it affirms the advent of only one such promised end-times prophetic figure (Ghulam Ahmad) as having appeared in accordance with scriptural prophecies. Such a prophetic status, though not independent, is nonetheless technically classed as prophethood in as much as it involves an individual who is given knowledge of the hidden, predicts future events and is called a prophet by Allah.

=== On other Muslims ===
A closely linked point of contention surrounded the status of Muslims who did not accept Ghulam Ahmad's claim. Muhammad Ali and his supporters, rejecting indiscriminate pronouncements of disbelief (kufr) concerning them, drew a distinction between those who were neutral in the controversy and those who actively rejected and opposed Ghulam Ahmad, or pronounced him an infidel. The former could not in any sense be termed disbelievers (kafirs) while the latter were guilty only of rejecting a particular commandment of the Islamic faith—namely that pertaining to belief in the promised Messiah—which would render them fasiqun (those who depart from the right path) in distinction to disbelief in a basic element of the faith which would have excluded them from the Muslim community (Ummah). Muhammad Ali repudiated the idea of declaring the entire Muslim community as disbelievers, a term which, according to him, could not apply to non-Ahmadi Muslims indiscriminately, something which he accused Mahmud Ahmad of doing.

Affirming a different typology of disbelief, i.e. that which subsists outside of Islam in contrast to that which does not entail exclusion from it, although Mahmud Ahmad held that Muslims who did not accept Ghulam Ahmad technically fell into the category of disbelief, and that rejection of him ultimately amounted to rejection of Muhammad, he utilised the broad connotations and usages of the Arabic word kafir to stress that his use of the term in reference to such Muslims did not carry its demotic meaning, but rather meant to signify doctrinal deviancy and to express that only Ahmadis were true Muslims. For him, since such Muslims as had not accepted one appointed by God (ma'mur minallah) within Islam were neither deniers of God nor Muhammad, they were still part of the Muslim community and were Muslims only in the sense that they belonged to the Ummah of Muhammad and as such were entitled to be treated as members of Muslim society (mu'ashira), which, according to him, was different from saying that they are Muslims and not kafirs. He held, therefore, that non-Ahmadi Muslims were to be classified as disbelievers albeit within the remit of Islam and not in the sense that they had a religion other than Islam; and, further, that the movement passed no judgement as to their fate in the hereafter and never proactively expressed this opinion of them. Although he refused demands from outside the movement to accept that the term kafir did not apply to non-Ahmadi Muslims, Mahmud Ahmad did maintain that such Muslims were not deemed to be outside the pale of Islam.

=== On succession ===
Towards the end of 1905, Mirza Ghulam Ahmad published a short treatise anticipating his own death entitled Al-Wasiyyat (or The Will) in which he established the Sadr Anjuman Ahmadiyya (Central Ahmadiyya Council), an executive body set up to administer the movement and to collect and distribute funds to support the propagation of Islam. Ghulam Ahmad presided over the Council himself until his death in 1908. After his death, Hakim Nur-ud-Din was unanimously chosen to succeed him and presided over the Council's appointed president. Muhammad Ali and his supporters held that Ghulam Ahmad, in The Will, had designated the Council as a consultative institution to be his successor. Viewing as autocratic the idea of one individual wielding absolute authority within the Community and demanding total obedience from it, they repudiated the idea of a khilāfah (caliphate) within the movement, preferring what they saw as a more democratic system established by Ghulam Ahmad himself and, accordingly, vested the Community's authority in the Council as an administrative body. No individual had the power to revoke the decisions reached by the majority of the Council that would remain paramount and binding, something which they believed was in keeping with Ghulam Ahmad's instructions for the movement's administration after his death. Further, according to them, since leadership of the movement was no longer divinely appointed after Ghulam Ahmad's death, the obligation to pledge allegiance to his successor had also lapsed and had become a voluntary act.

As opposed to the foregoing approach, Mahmud Ahmad, who assumed the movement's leadership as the second successor the day after Nur-ud-Din's death, held that Ghulam Ahmad had envisioned a system of divinely ordained caliphate to succeed him, similar to that believed to have commenced following the death of Muhammad, under whose authority the Council was to operate. Accordingly, he favoured centralised, singular authority through the system of caliphate which, in his view, was religiously indispensable and to which the Community's allegiance was necessary. Ghulam Ahmad's successors, according to him, continued to be divinely ordained and commanded obedience from the Community. This, he contended, was clearly indicated in The Will as well as Ghulam Ahmad's other works and was an arrangement which, according to him, had existed throughout the period of Nur-ud-Din's leadership who not only spoke of himself as the khalīfat al-masīh (caliph; lit. successor of the Messiah) but declared that he had attained this office by divine appointment rather than community choice. The Ahmadiyya Muslim Community, accordingly, vests its religious and organisational authority in the caliph as Ghulam Ahmad's divinely chosen successor.

=== On dresscode ===
Dr. Zahid Aziz a prominent Lahori Ahmadi Scholar from the UK, on the Lahore Ahmadiyya Blog when asked about the Hijab and Beard in 2015, dismissed these as "cultural practices" and not a part of Islam which is in contrast to the mainstream Ahmadiyya Muslim Community's view on the matter that it is absolutely compulsory, the term most commonly used by Ahmadi Muslims is 'Purdah'.

=== On the virgin birth of Jesus ===
While the Ahmadiyya Muslim Community holds the view that Jesus born of the virgin Mary is a fundamental belief in Islam, many pioneer and prominent Lahori Ahmadi Muslims deny that the virgin birth indeed occurred and stated that Mirza Ghulam Ahmad had no issues with his followers holding different opinions on such matters

== Community locations ==
=== Asia ===
Indonesia
The Lahore Ahmadiyya movement, also known as Gerakan Ahmadiyyah Indonesia (GAI) in Indonesia, had 708 members In the 1980s.

Pakistan
There are estimated to be between 5,000 and 10,000 Lahori Ahmadis in Pakistan. The international administrative headquarters of the Lahore Ahmadiyya Movement are situated in the city of Lahore where the group originated.

=== Europe ===
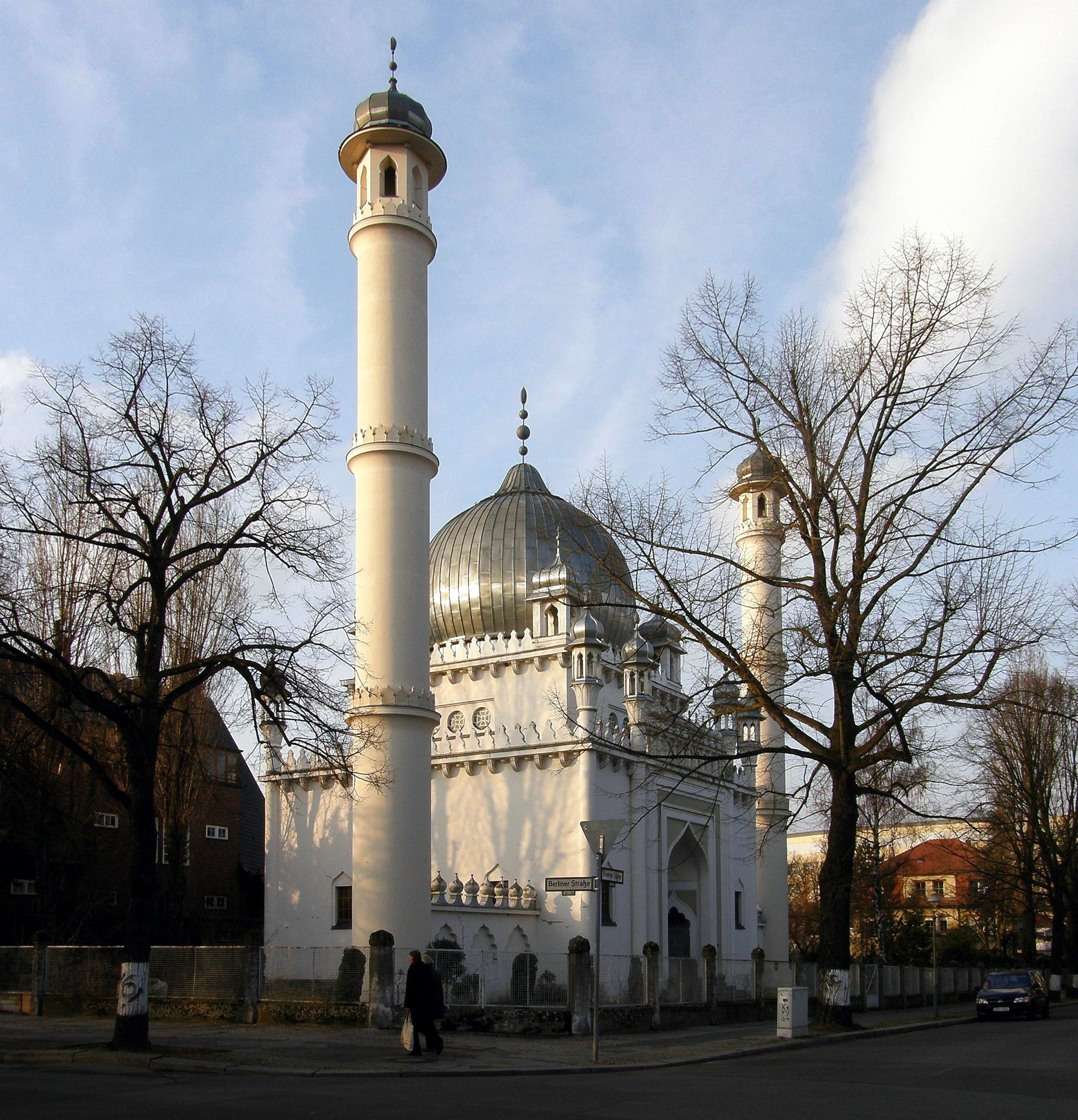
The Berlin Mosque in 2008

Germany
The Berlin Mosque was built in 1924/27.
An Arabic-German edition of the Qur'an was translated by Hugo Marcus, published in 1939.
There were about 60 adherents to the Lahore Ahmadiyya movement in Germany in 2001.

Netherlands
Small communities in the Netherlands are located in Amsterdam, The Hague, Rotterdam and Utrecht.

United Kingdom
In 1913, a mission station was established by the Ahmadiyya movement in Woking (near London) and the Shah Jahan Mosque management aligned itself with the Lahore Ahmadiyya Movement from 1914 until the 1960s, although it operated on a non-sectarian basis. The Qur'an was translated into English by Maulana Muhammad Ali.

=== North America ===
Canada
The Ontario Ahmadiyya Anjuman Isha'at Islam Lahore (OAAIIL) operates the Toryork Mosque in North York. It was in incorporated in Toryork Industrial Park on November 01, 1991. Apart from being organised and supported by local congregants, members, and their families in the Greater Toronto Area (GTA), the center, while operating as an independent and autonomous community, receives explicit support from a larger body based in Trinidad and Tobago. Maulāna Mustapha Kemal Hydal (M.K. Hydal) is the primary spiritual advisor for both bodies. While the Islamic Sunrise has been the key newsletter published by the former body, many of the English-language books for the 'propagation of Islam' present at the TorYork Mosque are those published by their counterparts in the United States of America (i.e. Ohio) and, to a lesser extent, the United Kingdom and elsewhere.

Trinidad and Tobago
There are 5 mosques that follow the principles taught by The Ahmadiyya Anjuman Ishaat-i-Islam Lahore in Trinidad and Tobago.

United States of America
There are at least three hubs for the Lahore Ahmadi Movement in the USA. One is registered in Dublin, Ohio. A second is based in Hollis, New York. The third location is in Newark, California. The Ahmadiyya Anjuman Ishaat Islam Lahore Inc. (USA) in Columbus, Ohio is notable for their publication and propagation activities.

=== South America ===
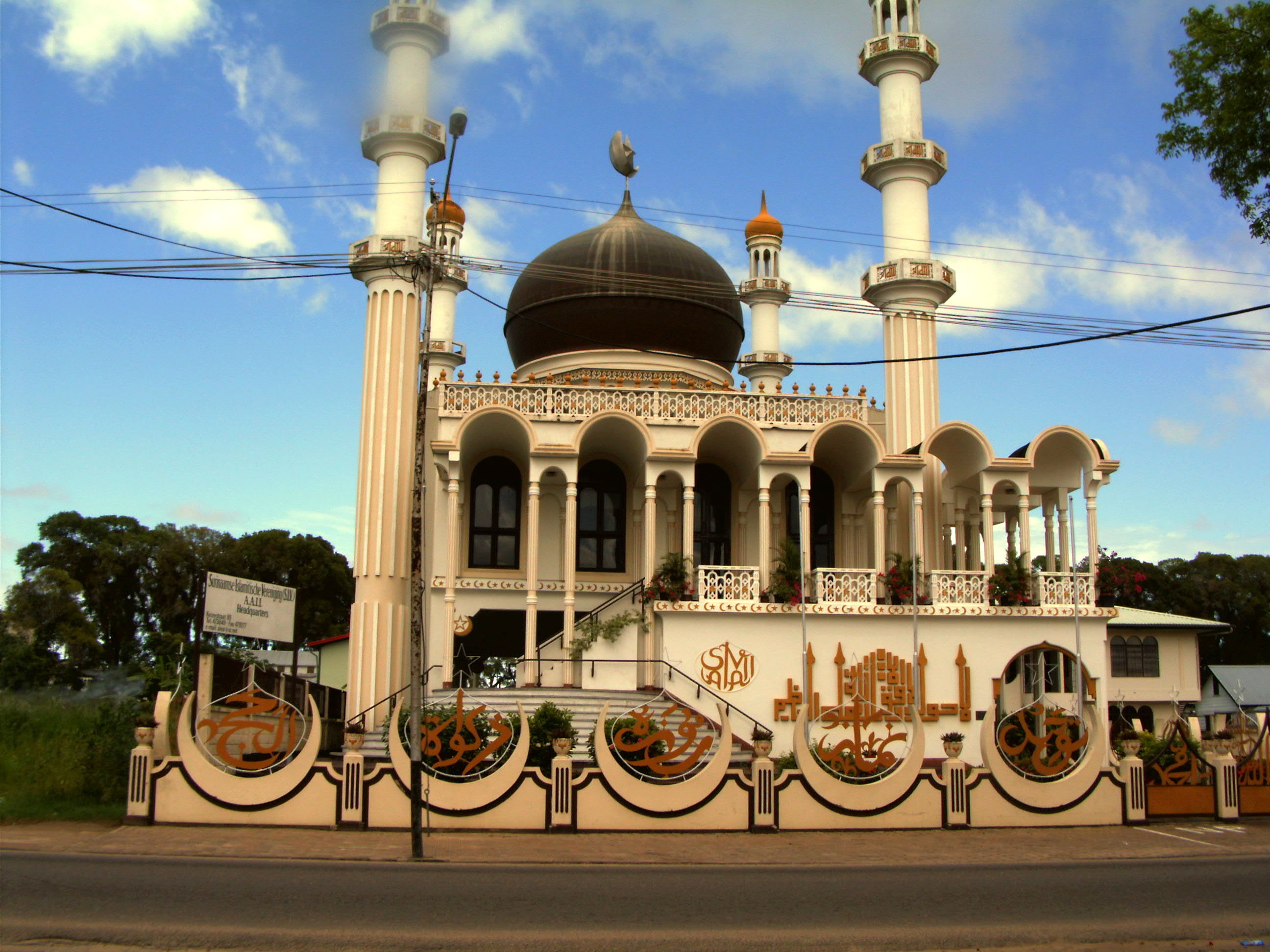
Mosque Keizerstraat in Suriname

In Suriname, the Mosque Keizerstraat is located adjacent to a synagogue in Paramaribo, built in 1984.

== Demographics ==
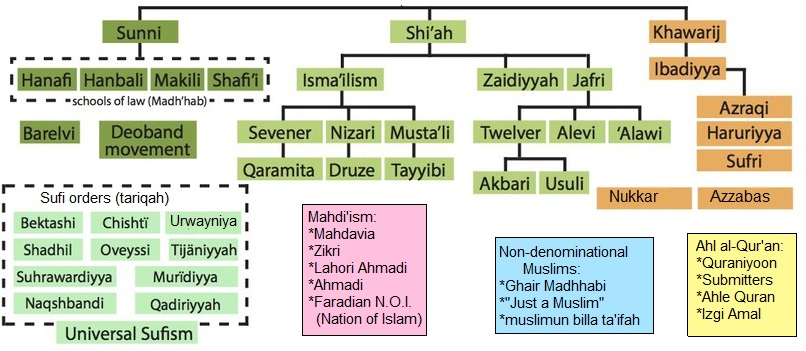
Diagram showing the Lahori Muslim as well as other branches.

Reliable statistics on the worldwide Lahore Ahmadiyya movement do not exist. However, sources do suggest that in comparison to the Ahmadiyya Muslim Community, the Lahore Ahmadiyya population is relatively very small. In particular, it is estimated that there may be between 5,000 and 10,000 Lahori Ahmadis in Pakistan and possibly up to 30,000 worldwide, thereby representing less than 0.2% of the worldwide Ahmadiyya population.

== Leaders (Amīrs) ==
- Maulana Muhammad Ali (1874 – 13 October 1951), (Ameer 1914 – 1951)
- Maulana Sadr-ud-Din (c. 1880 – 15 November 1981), (Ameer 1951 – 1981)
- Dr. Saeed Ahmad Khan (1900 – 15 November 1996), (Ameer 1981 – 1996)
- Dr. Asghar Hameed (1919 – 14 October 2002), (Ameer 1996 – 2002)
- Dr. Abdul Karim Saeed Pasha (Current Amīr)

== See also ==
- Khwaja Kamal-ud-Din
- Woking Muslim Mission
- Islamic Review

Dr Zahid Aziz
