= Berlin Mosque =

Mosque in Berlin, Germany

- Wilmersdorfer Moschee
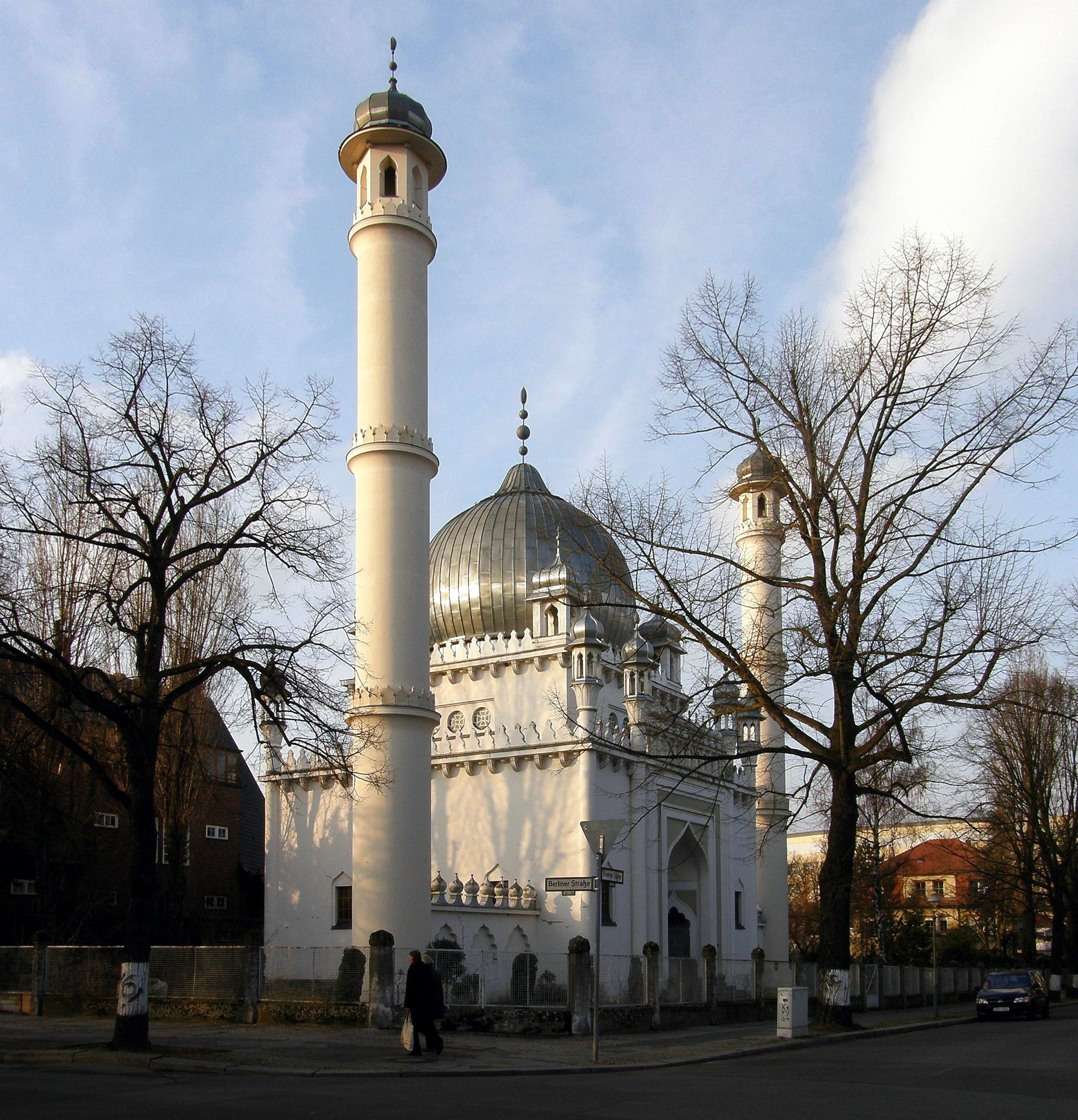

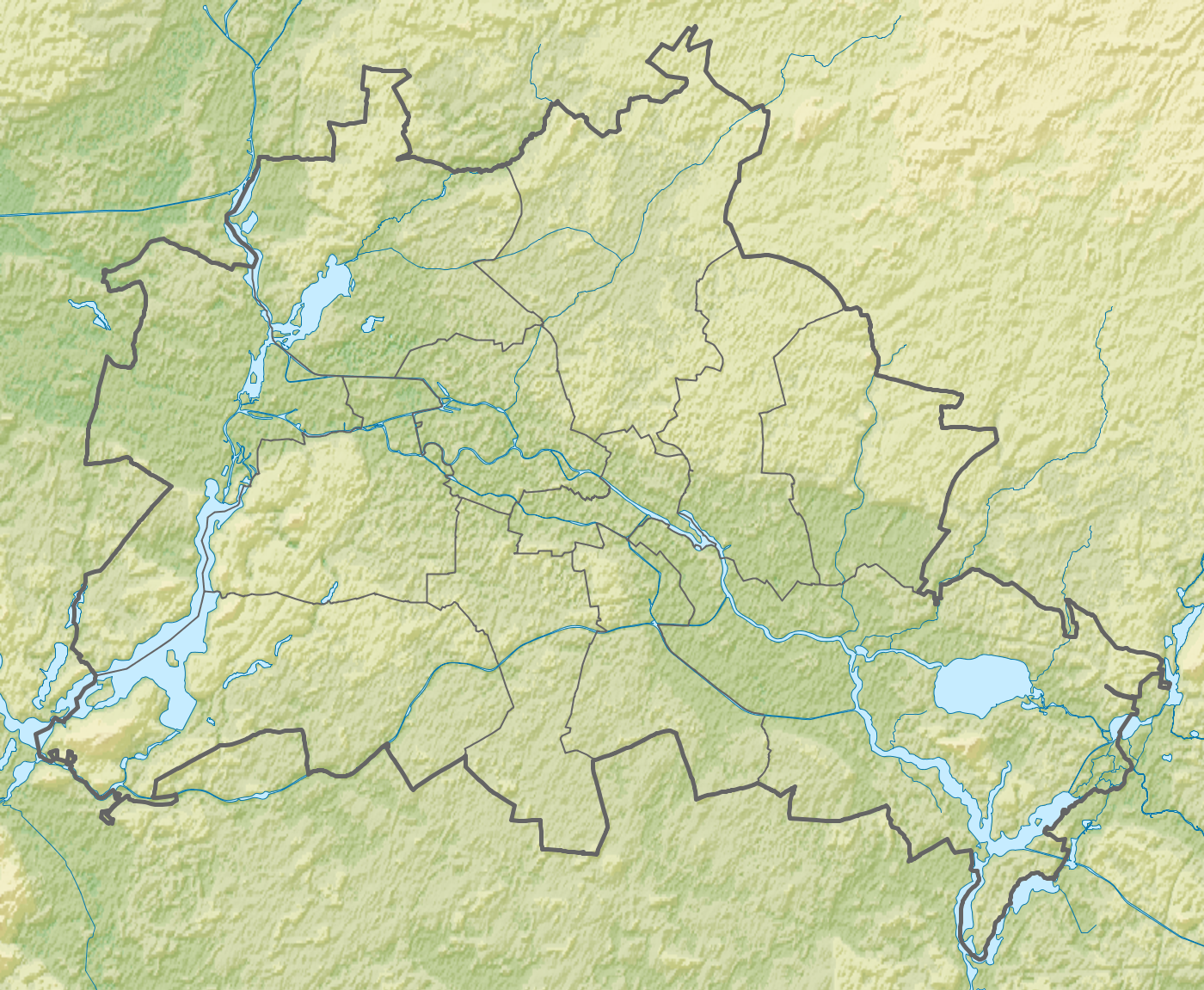
- Location within Berlin

Religion
- Affiliation: Ahmadiyya Islam
- Ecclesiastical or organizational status: Mosque
- Governing body: Lahore Ahmadiyya Movement for the Propagation of Islam
- Status: Active

Location
- Location: Wilmersdorf, Berlin
- Country: Germany
- Interactive map of Berlin Mosque
- Coordinates: 52°29′15″N 13°18′42″E

Architecture
- Architect: K. A. Hermann
- Type: Mosque
- Style: Neo-Mughal; Modern Indo-Islamic
- Completed: 1925

Specifications
- Capacity: 400 worshippers
- Length: 14.2 m (46.5 ft)
- Width: 14.2 m (46.5 ft)
- Dome: 1
- Dome height (outer): 26 m (85 ft)
- Dome dia. (outer): 23 m (75 ft)
- Minaret: 2
- Minaret height: 27.5 m (90 ft)

Website
- berlin.ahmadiyya.org (in German)

The Berlin Mosque, officially the Wilmersdorfer Mosque (German: Wilmersdorfer Moschee), is a mosque located in the Wilmersdorf borough of Berlin, Germany. Situated on Brienner Straße 7–8, the mosque was designed by K. A. Hermann and was built between 1923 and 1925. Berlin Mosque, which has two 27-metre-tall (90 ft) minarets, was heavily damaged in World War II. The two minarets were rebuilt between 1999 and 2001. The mosque is owned and administered by the Lahore Ahmadiyya Movement (Ahmadiyya Anjuman Isha'at-i-Islam Lahore).

The foundation stone was laid on 6 August 1923 and the mosque was inaugurated officially on 26 April 1925. Completed in a Neo-Mughal style, reflecting the great buildings of that time with onion dome and pastel colors, the mosque is similar to the tombs of the Mughal Empire. The building's symmetry also reflects that of the Taj Mahal. Next to the mosque is the two-storey residence of the imam.

== History ==
Due to the small influence Islam had in Germany prior to the building of the mosque in the 1900s, the Berlin Mosque was preceded by a small wooden structure built outside of Berlin, which was destroyed in 1923.

In February 1920, Indian Muslim political activist Pro. Abdul Jabbar Kheri met a German Muslim, Dr. Khalid Banning and began to consider the prospects of setting up an Islamic Centre in Berlin. While he considered this with Dr. Khalid Banning, Pro Abdul Jabbar Kheri received letters originally written to the imam of the Woking Muslim Mission of England from a German lady suggesting the opening of a mission in Berlin following the basis of the Woking Muslim Mission of the Shah Jehan Mosque. His brother, Pro. Sattar Kheri sent the letters out to the Imam of the Mosque at Woking, Maulana Mustafa Khan and from there it reached the Lahore Ahmadiyya Movement. The purview and the viability of the plan was considered and eventually accepted by the Lahore Movement.

In May 1922, the Mohammadan, a popular English newspaper in India, published an article with the title "The Need for the Propagation of Islam in Germany". The article was written by Pro. Abdus Sattar Kheri, an Indian Muslim political activist living in Berlin. He and his brother, Pro. Abdul Jabbar Kheri, were known as the Kheri Brothers and were the ones that initiated the idea of setting up an Islamic centre in Germany. They both played a significant role in leading the organisation of Muslims in the German capital in the early 1920s.

Not long after, the Lahore Ahmadiyya Movement constructed a mosque in Germany. The Berlin Mosque's tall minarets and dome were heavily damaged in World War II due to an attack by Russian soldiers. The mosque was reopened in 1952 following a grant from the Berlin Monuments Department to restore the building.

== See also ==
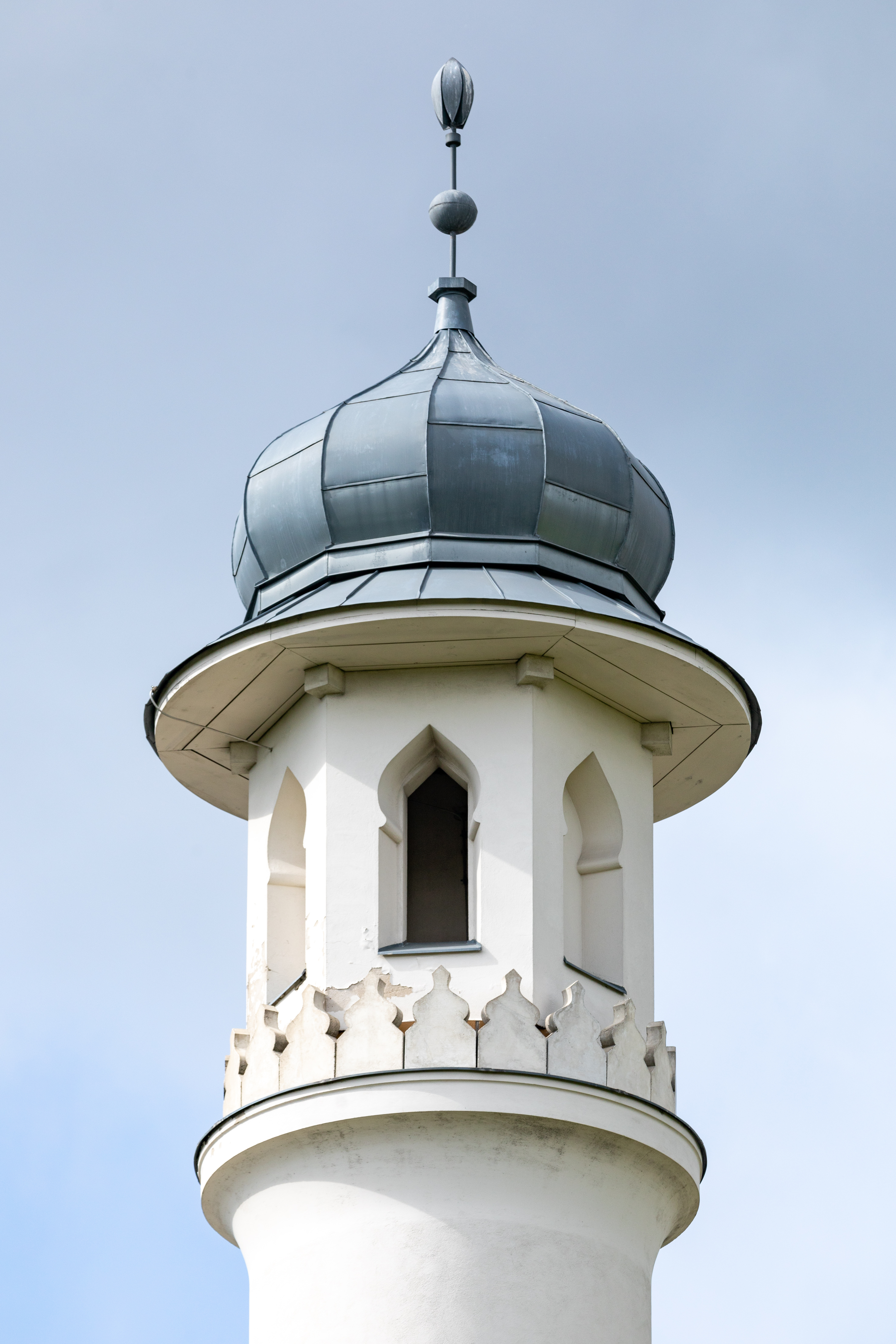
An image of one of the minarets that shows keel-arched openings capped with an onion dome-like feature.

- Ahmadiyya in Germany
- Islam in Germany
- Religion in Berlin
- List of mosques in Germany
- List of Ahmadiyya buildings and structures in Germany
