= Sadr ud-Din =

Pakistani cleric and missionary

Maulana Sadr-ud-Din
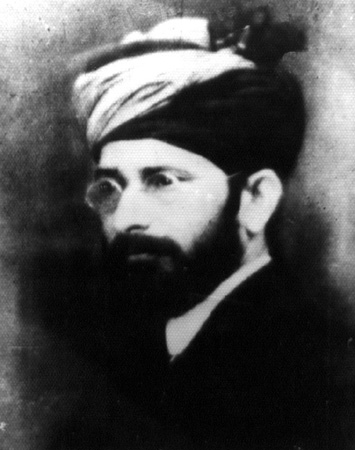
- Title: Amir [Head] of the Ahmadiyya community of the Lahore Section

Personal life
- Born: 1 January 1881 (day and month not known) Lahore, British India
- Died: 15 November 1981 (aged 99–100) Ahmadiyya Buildings, Lahore, Pakistan
- Notable work(s): German-language translation of the Quran, Founder of the Berlin Mosque at Wilmersdorf in 1924
- Occupation: Educator, missionary

Religious life
- Religion: Islam
- Movement: Lahore Ahmadiyya Movement for the Propagation of Islam

Sadr ud-Din (Urdu: صدر الدین, romanized: Ṣadr ud-Dīn; died 15 November 1981) was a Pakistani educationist and Islamic scholar who served as a missionary of the Ahmadiyya Anjuman Ishaat-i-Islam Lahore in the Shah Jahan Mosque of Woking during 1914-1916 and 1919-1920. He built the Berlin Mosque (Die Moschee) in Germany, 1924-1927. The centenary of this Mosque was marked in September 2024, and it was visited on 12th March 2025 by the President of Germany, Frank-Walter Steinmeier.

Maulana Sadr-ud-Din joined the Ahmadiyya Movement at the hand of the Founder of the Ahmadiyya Movement, Hazrat Mirza Ghulam Ahmad in 1905. Shortly after the Founder's death, at the appeal of Hazrat Maulana Nur-ud-Din, the Head of the Ahmadiyya Movement, he left his teaching post to serve as Headmaster of the Talim-ul-Islam High School in Qadian, where remained till April 1914. He tended to Hazrat Maulana Nur-ud-Din in his last illness at the beginning of 1914.

He then worked in the Lahore Ahmadiyya Movement, and became its Head in October 1951.

== Work ==
- Der Koran: Arabisch-Deutsch: Übersetzung, Einleitung und Erklärung von Maulana Sadr-ud-Din (Berlin: Verlag der Moslemischen Revue (self published) 1939). 2. unveränderte Auflage 1964; 3. unveränderte Auflage 2006.
