= Woking Muslim Mission =

Ahmadiyya Mosque run from 1913 to 1960s

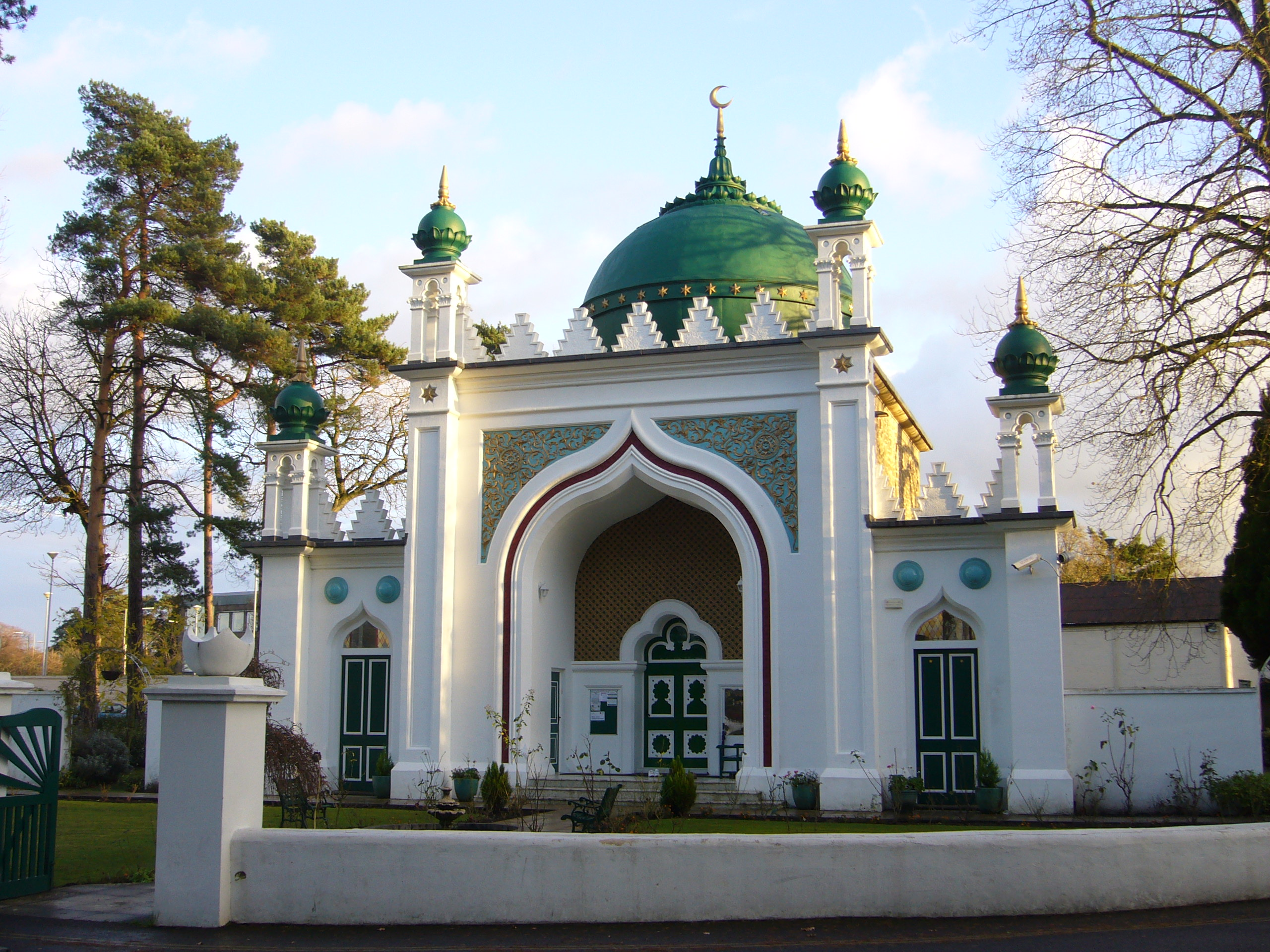
Shah Jahan Mosque, Woking, 1899

The Woking Muslim Mission was founded in 1913 by Khwaja Kamal-ud-Din (d. December 1932) at the Mosque in Woking, 30 miles southwest of London and was managed, from 1914, by members of the Lahore Ahmadiyya Movement (Ahmadiyya Anjuman Ishaat-i-Islam, AAIIL). It was run by Lahore Ahmadiyya missionaries until the mid-1960s.

== Woking Mosque ==
The Shah Jahan Mosque, Woking was built by Dr G. W. Leitner (d. 1899) in 1889. It was only opened up and used on special occasions. The Indian lawyer, Khwaja Kamal-ud-Din, had come to fight a case in England on behalf of a client. While in England he was told about the Woking Mosque by the first successor (Khalifat-ul-Masih) of the Ahmadiyya Muslim Community, Hakim Maulana Nur-ud-Din. There was already a Woking Muslim Trust that was set up to take control of the mosque. What is unclear is how much involvement Khwaja Sahib had with this trust. But what is clear is that Mirza Sir Abba Ali Baig had requested Khwaja Kamal-ud-Din to become Imam of the mosque.

The Khwaja then setup the Woking Muslim Mission and Literary Trust for the running of the mosque.

The Woking Mosque and mission remained the pre-eminent centre of Islam in Great Britain from 1913 to the mid-1960s.

== Woking Mission ==
The Woking Muslim Mission was established by Khwaja Kamal-ud-Din. His first stay in England was from September 1912 until August 1914. He established the mission with the encouragement of Maulana Noor-ud-Din, head of the Ahmadiyya Movement till March 1914. After the split in the Ahmadiyya Movement in 1914 Khwaja Kamal-ud-Din was associated with the Lahore Branch.

Khwaja Kamal-ud-Din started his work from the inspiration of Mirza Ghulam Ahmad, who had a deep desire to present Islam to the West. In February 1913 the Khwaja started a monthly periodical, The Islamic Review, which for over 55 years was the main Islamic publication in the West.

At Eid occasions, from 1913 to the mid-1960s, Muslims from all nations present in England at the time gathered at the Woking Mosque. Woking in those days became a replica in miniature of Mecca in the West, a multinational spectacle that could be matched in its multitude only with Hajj in Mecca itself.

People converting to Islam in England during the years 1913 to the mid-1960s did so generally through this mission. In 1924 it was estimated that there was a total Muslim population in England of 10,000, of which 1,000 were converts.

The book Islam, Our Choice, containing accounts by Muslim converts of how they came to embrace Islam, was originally compiled and published by the Woking Muslim Mission. It has subsequently been re-published all over the world by other Muslim publishers who have deleted the name of the Woking Muslim Mission and of Khwaja Kamal-ud-Din from within the accounts given by the converts.

== See also ==
- Muslim Literary Society
