= Shah Jahan Mosque, Woking =

Mosque in Woking, England

Shah Jahan Mosque
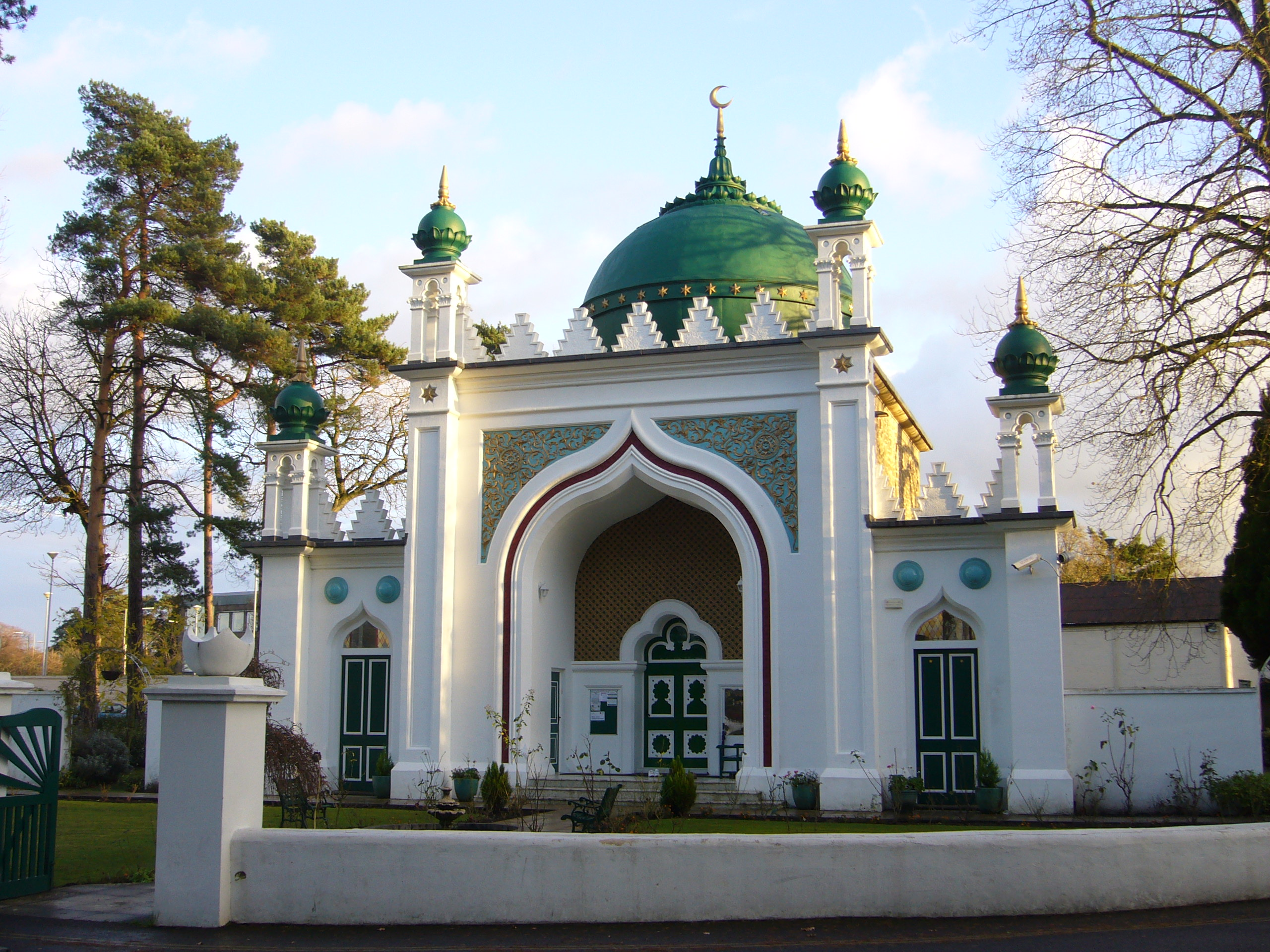

- Location within Surrey

Religion
- Affiliation: Sunni Islam (previously Lahore Ahmadiyya Movement)

Location
- Location: Oriental Road, Woking, England
- Coordinates: 51°19′21.8289″N 0°32′40.49876″W

Architecture
- Architect: W. I. Chambers
- Type: Mosque
- Style: Indo-Islamic architecture
- Completed: 1889

Specifications
- Dome: 1
- Minaret: 2 miniature

Website
- shahjahanmosque.org.uk

The Shah Jahan Mosque (also known as Woking Mosque) on Oriental Road, Woking, England, is the first purpose-built mosque in the United Kingdom. Built in 1889, it is located 30 miles (50 km) southwest of London. It is a Grade I listed building.

The Mosque carries out interfaith activities with the aim of promoting understanding, peace and harmony.

== Construction ==
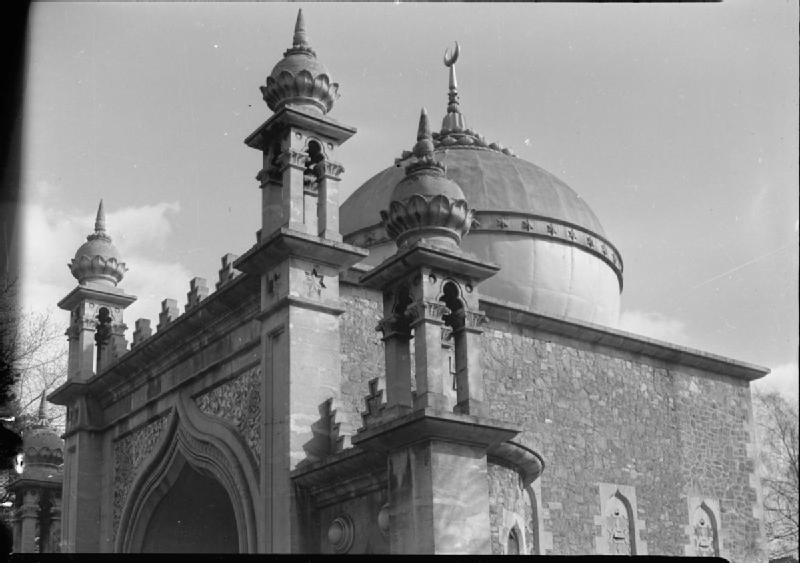
The dome of Shah Jahan Mosque in 1945

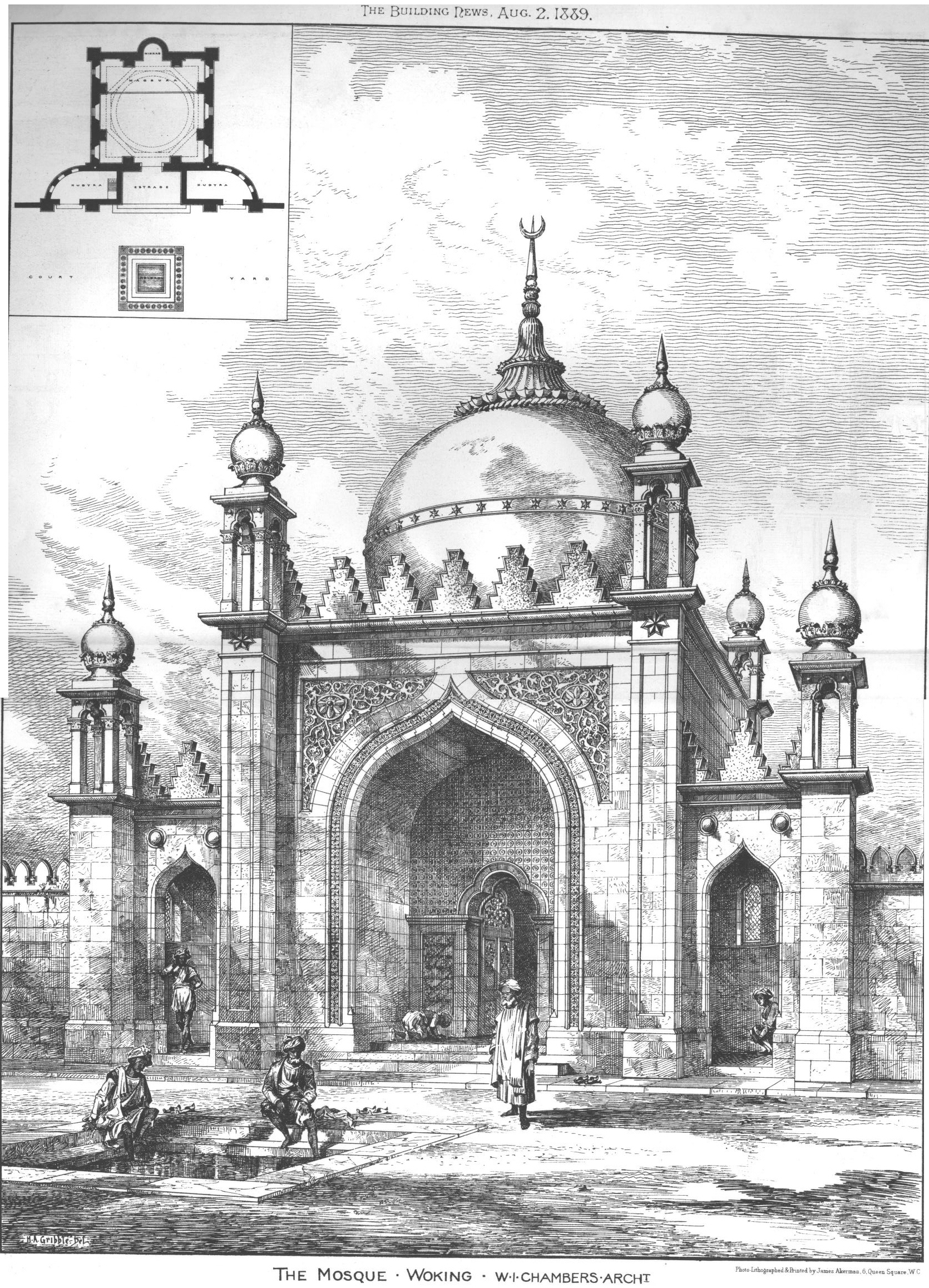
Drawing by W. I. Chambers, in The Building News and Engineering Journal, 2 August 1889

The Shah Jahan Mosque was built in 1889 by Hungarian-British Orientalist Gottlieb Wilhelm Leitner. It was partly funded by Nawab Shah Jahan Begum of Bhopal, as a place for students at the Oriental Institute in Woking to worship. The mosque was designed by architect William Isaac Chambers (1847–1924) and built in Bath and Bargate stone. It was designed in a late Mughal style, and has a dome, minarets, and a courtyard. The architecture was described by Pevsner Architectural Guides as "extraordinarily dignified". The alignment with Mecca was established by a ship's captain, brought in to take bearings.

The Oriental Institute, for the students of which the mosque was constructed, was founded by Leitner in 1881. He had purchased the former Royal Dramatic College building in Woking and established the Institute in order to promote oriental literature. It awarded degrees from the University of the Punjab in Lahore, Pakistan.

== History ==
=== 1889-1912 – First Sunni period ===
The mosque became the first formal place of Islamic worship in England. Queen Victoria's British Indian employees and her British Indian secretary, Abdul Karim, used the mosque when the Queen visited Windsor Castle. A small number of dignitaries, students, and guests used the mosque until Leitner's death in 1899, following which the mosque closed.

During his 1895 visit of England, Afghan prince Nasrullah Khan prayed Eid al-Adha prayers at the mosque and made a donation of £492 on behalf of his father Emir Abdur Rahman.

=== 1912-1935 – Lahore Ahmadi period ===
The mosque fell into disuse between Leitner's death and 1913. The London Mosque fund (which was founded in 1910) created the Woking Mosque Trust on Wednesday 17 April 1912. During that meeting it was agreed by all members that they were to take over the title deeds. It was also unanimously agreed by the committee members that Leitner's son should be elected to the Woking mosque trust committee. The Woking Mosque, the Memorial House and related property was passed into the ownership of the Woking Mosque Trust by a document of Indenture dated 12 April 1915

Khwaja Kamal-ud-Din, a prominent Kashmiri lawyer and member of the Ahmadiyya was invited to become the Imam and help maintain the mosque. Kamal-ud-Din's son, Khwaja Nazir Ahmad, gave credit to Mirza Sir Abbas Ali Baig for saving the mosque from being sold by the Leitner family for the purposes of a private factory.

"It is, however, with his services to the cause of Islam that we of the Woking Muslim Mission are chiefly concerned. It was Sir Abbas Ali Baig who saved from the hands of the Leitner family the Shah Jehan Mosque and Sir Salar Jung Memorial House at Woking and thus rescued them from the fate of being converted into a private factory. He subsequently founded the Woking Mosque Trust and raised funds for its maintenance."

It attracted royal visitors and famous British converts, such as Lord Headley and Marmaduke Pickthall. During the First World War, the incumbent imam, Sadr-Ud-Din, petitioned the UK government to grant nearby land to the mosque as a burial ground for British Indian Muslim soldiers. By 1917, this burial ground, designed by T Herbert Winney and now Grade II listed, had been constructed and received the bodies of 19 soldiers from the hospital for British Indian soldiers at Brighton Pavilion.

On 28 May 1922, the mosque held a celebration of Eid al-Fitr at the end of Ramadan, thought to have been the first time such public celebration had taken place in the United Kingdom. It was at this celebration that Kamal-ud-Din announced that the mosque would be named Shah Jehan, after its benefactress.

=== 1935-present – Second Sunni period ===
Khwaja Kamal-ud-Din died in 1932, and in 1935, due to increasing pressure from Sunnis, the mosque officially broke ties with Ahmadi movement and returned to being a Sunni mosque.

Until the arrival of Pakistani immigrants in the UK in the 1960s, the Shah Jahan Mosque was the centre of Islam in Britain. It was from the mosque that The Islamic Review was published, as well as Maulana Muhammad Ali's popular English translations of the Quran. It has also been claimed as the location at which the name 'Pakistan' was coined. Among those that visited the mosque in this time were Faisal of Saudi Arabia, Muhammad Ali Jinnah, Haile Selassie, Mir Yousuf Ali Khan, Aga Khan III, and Tunku Abdul Rahman.

It was badly damaged in June 2016, after floods swamped homes in the surrounding area.

== In fiction ==
Chapter IX of HG Wells's The War of the Worlds, published in 1898, contains a description of the Mosque being damaged:

About six in the evening, as I sat at tea with my wife in the summerhouse talking vigorously about the battle that was lowering upon us, I heard a muffled detonation from the common, and immediately after a gust of firing. Close on the heels of that came a violent rattling crash, quite close to us, that shook the ground; and, starting out upon the lawn, I saw the tops of the trees about the Oriental College burst into smoky red flame, and the tower of the little church beside it slide down into ruin. The pinnacle of the mosque had vanished, and the roof line of the college itself looked as if a hundred-ton gun had been at work upon it.

== See also ==
- Woking Muslim Mission
- Khwaja Kamal-ud-Din
- Muslim Burial Ground, Horsell Common
- Mosque of the Bois de Vincennes
