= January 5 =

January 5 this year in various calendars
- Monday, 5 January 2026
Akan	Fodwo
Armenian	19 Arach 1475
Aztec	Huei Tozoztli 15, 9 Calli
Babylonian	15 Kislimu, 2336 SE
Balinese pawukon	Luang, Pepet, Pasah, Jaya, Paing, Tungleh, Coma of Merakih, Kala, Dangu, Duka
Bengali	21 Poush, BS 1432
Chinese	Yin Earth Rabbit・Exntended Net Mansion; Wood Snake Year, Month 11, Day 17 (Xiaohan, 15 days until Dahan)
Common Era	5 January 2026 CE
Coptic	27 Koiak, AM 1742
Egyptian	24 Pachon, 2774 NE
Ethiopian	27 Tākḫśāś, 2018 Amätä Məhrät
French Republican	Décade II, Sextidi de Nivôse de l'Année 234 de la République
Gregorian	5 January, AD 2026
Hebrew	16 Tevet, AM 5786
Hindu	Puṣya・Vaidhṛti; Solar: 21 Pauṣa, 1947 SE; Lunisolar: Dvitīyā, Kṛishna pakṣa of Pauṣa, 2082 VE; Siddhārthin・5126 KY・1,872,580
Icelandic	Mánudagur, 13 Mörsugur 2025
Islamic	16 Rajab, AH 1447 (using tabular method)
ISO week date	2026-W02-1
Japanese	17 Shimotsuki, Reiwa 8 (Shōkan, 15 days until Daikan)
Julian	23 December, AD 2025 (AM 7535)
Julian day	2461046
Korean	17 Jwidal, 4358 DE
Maya	13.0.13.4.3; 1 Muan, 9 Akbal
Roman	ante diem X Kalendas Ianuarias, MMDCCLXXIX AUC
Solar Hijri	15 Dey, SH 1404
Tibetan	17 mgo, shing mo sbrul 2152 or 1771 or 999

<<	January					>>
Su	Mo	Tu	We	Th	Fr	Sa
				1	2	3
4	5	6	7	8	9	10
11	12	13	14	15	16	17
18	19	20	21	22	23	24
25	26	27	28	29	30	31
2026

January 5 in recent years
2026 (Monday)
2025 (Sunday)
2024 (Friday)
2023 (Thursday)
2022 (Wednesday)
2021 (Tuesday)
2020 (Sunday)
2019 (Saturday)
2018 (Friday)
2017 (Thursday)

January 5 is the fifth day of the year in the Gregorian calendar; 360 days remain until the end of the year (361 in leap years).

== Events ==
=== Pre-1600 ===
- 1477 – Battle of Nancy: Charles the Bold is defeated and killed in a conflict with René II, Duke of Lorraine; Burgundy subsequently becomes part of France.

=== 1601–1900 ===
- 1675 – Battle of Colmar: The French army defeats forces from Austria and Brandenburg.
- 1757 – Louis XV of France survives an assassination attempt by Robert-François Damiens, who becomes the last person to be executed in France by drawing and quartering (the traditional form of capital punishment used for regicides).
- 1781 – American Revolutionary War: Richmond, Virginia, is burned by British naval forces led by former American general Benedict Arnold.
- 1822 – The government of Central America votes for total annexation to the First Mexican Empire.
- 1875 – The Palais Garnier, one of the most famous opera houses in the world, is inaugurated in Paris.
- 1895 – Dreyfus affair: French army officer Alfred Dreyfus is stripped of his rank and sentenced to life imprisonment on Devil's Island.
- 1900 – Irish nationalist leader John Edward Redmond calls for revolt against British rule.

=== 1901–present ===
- 1911 – Kappa Alpha Psi, the world's third-oldest and largest black fraternity, is founded at Indiana University.
- 1912 – The sixth All-Russian Conference of the Russian Social Democratic Labour Party (Prague Party Conference) opens. In the course of the conference, Vladimir Lenin and his supporters break from the rest of the party to form the Bolshevik movement.
- 1913 – First Balkan War: The Battle of Lemnos begins; Greek admiral Pavlos Kountouriotis forces the Turkish fleet to retreat to its base within the Dardanelles, from which it did not venture for the rest of the war.
- 1914 – The Ford Motor Company announces an eight-hour workday and minimum daily wage of $5 in salary plus bonuses.
- 1919 – The German Workers' Party, which would become the Nazi Party, is founded in Munich.
- 1925 – Nellie Tayloe Ross of Wyoming becomes the first female governor in the United States.
- 1933 – Construction of the Golden Gate Bridge begins in San Francisco Bay.
- 1941 – Amy Johnson, a 37-year-old pilot and the first woman to fly solo from London to Australia, disappears after bailing out of her plane over the River Thames, and is presumed dead.
- 1944 – The Daily Mail becomes the first major London newspaper to be published on both sides of the Atlantic Ocean.
- 1945 – The Soviet Union recognizes the new pro-Soviet Provisional Government of the Republic of Poland.
- 1948 – The Semiramis Hotel bombing kills at least 23 people.
- 1949 – In his State of the Union address, United States President Harry S. Truman unveils his Fair Deal program.
- 1953 – The play Waiting for Godot by Samuel Beckett receives its première in Paris.
- 1957 – In a speech given to the United States Congress, United States President Dwight D. Eisenhower announces the establishment of what will later be called the Eisenhower Doctrine.
- 1967 – Cultural Revolution: The Shanghai People's Commune is established following the seizure of power from local city officials by revolutionaries.
- 1968 – Alexander Dubček comes to power in Czechoslovakia, effectively beginning the "Prague Spring".
- 1969 – The Venera 5 space probe is launched at 06:28:08 UTC from Baikonur.
- 1969 – Ariana Afghan Airlines Flight 701 crashes in Fernhill, West Sussex, UK, while on approach to Gatwick Airport, killing 50 people.
- 1970 – The 7.1 M_{w} Tonghai earthquake shakes Tonghai County, Yunnan province, China, with a maximum Mercalli intensity of X (Extreme). Between 10,000 and 15,000 people are known to have been killed and about another 26,000 are injured.
- 1970 – A Spantax Convair CV-990 Coronado crashes during takeoff from Stockholm Arlanda Airport, killing five people.
- 1972 – US President Richard Nixon announces the Space Shuttle program.
- 1975 – The Tasman Bridge in Tasmania, Australia, is struck by the bulk ore carrier Lake Illawarra, killing twelve people.
- 1976 – The Khmer Rouge announce that the new Constitution of Democratic Kampuchea is ratified.
- 1976 – The Troubles: Gunmen shoot dead ten Protestant civilians after stopping their minibus at Kingsmill in County Armagh, Northern Ireland, UK, allegedly as retaliation for a string of attacks on Irish Catholic civilians in the area by Loyalists, particularly the killing of six Catholics the night before.
- 1991 – Georgian forces enter Tskhinvali, the capital of South Ossetia, Georgia, opening the 1991–92 South Ossetia War.
- 1991 – Somali Civil War: The United States Embassy to Somalia in Mogadishu is evacuated by helicopter airlift days after the outbreak of violence in Mogadishu.
- 1993 – The oil tanker MV Braer runs aground on the coast of the Shetland Islands, spilling 84,700 tons of crude oil.
- 2003 – A suicide bombing at the Tel Aviv central bus station kills 23 people and injures over 100 more.
- 2005 – The dwarf planet Eris is discovered by Palomar Observatory-based astronomers, later motivating the International Astronomical Union (IAU) to define the term planet for the first time.
- 2014 – A launch of the communication satellite GSAT-14 aboard the GSLV MK.II D5 marks the first successful flight of an Indian cryogenic engine.
- 2022 – Kazakh President Kassym-Jomart Tokayev dismisses Prime Minister Asqar Mamin and declares state of emergency over the 2022 Kazakh unrest.
- 2023 – The 2023 Sinaloa unrest begins.
- 2024 – Alaska Airlines Flight 1282 makes an emergency landing at Portland International Airport after a door plug blows off the Boeing 737 MAX 9 operating the flight. There are no fatalities, but the accident prompts the 737 MAX to be grounded and renews scrutiny on Boeing's manufacturing and design issues.

== Births ==
=== Pre-1600 ===
- 1209 – Richard, 1st Earl of Cornwall, English prince, nominal King of Germany (died 1272)
- 1530 – Gaspar de Bono, monk of the Order of the Minims (died 1571)
- 1548 – Francisco Suárez, Spanish priest, philosopher, and theologian (died 1617)
- 1587 – Xu Xiake, Chinese geographer and explorer (died 1641)
- 1592 – Shah Jahan, Mughal emperor (died 1666)

=== 1601–1900 ===
- 1620 – Miklós Zrínyi, Croatian military commander (died 1664)
- 1640 – Paolo Lorenzani, Italian composer (died 1713)
- 1735 – Claude Martin, French-English general and explorer (died 1800)
- 1767 – Jean-Baptiste Say, French economist and academic (died 1832)
- 1779 – Stephen Decatur, American commander (died 1820)
- 1779 – Zebulon Pike, American general and explorer (died 1813)
- 1781 – Gaspar Flores de Abrego, three terms mayor of San Antonio, in Spanish Texas (died 1836)
- 1793 – Harvey Putnam, American lawyer and politician (died 1855)
- 1808 – Anton Füster, Austrian priest and activist (died 1881)
- 1834 – William John Wills, English surgeon and explorer (died 1861)
- 1838 – Camille Jordan, French mathematician and academic (died 1922)
- 1846 – Rudolf Christoph Eucken, German philosopher and author, Nobel Prize laureate (died 1926)
- 1846 – Mariam Baouardy, Syrian Roman Catholic nun; later canonized (died 1878)
- 1855 – King Camp Gillette, American businessman, founded the Gillette Company (died 1932)
- 1864 – Bob Caruthers, American baseball player and manager (died 1911)
- 1865 – Fatima Cates, British Muslim convert and activist (died 1900)
- 1867 – Dimitrios Gounaris, Greek lawyer and politician, 94th Prime Minister of Greece (died 1922)
- 1871 – Frederick Converse, American composer and academic (died 1940)
- 1874 – Joseph Erlanger, American physiologist and academic, Nobel Prize laureate (died 1965)
- 1876 – Konrad Adenauer, German lawyer and politician, Chancellor of West Germany (died 1967)
- 1879 – Hans Eppinger, Austrian physician and academic (died 1946)
- 1880 – Nikolai Medtner, Russian pianist and composer (died 1951)
- 1881 – Pablo Gargallo, Spanish sculptor and painter (died 1934)
- 1882 – Herbert Bayard Swope, American journalist (died 1958)
- 1882 – Edwin Barclay, 18th president of Liberia (died 1955)
- 1885 – Humbert Wolfe, Italian-English poet and civil servant (died 1940)
- 1886 – Markus Reiner, Israeli physicist and engineer (died 1976)
- 1892 – Agnes von Kurowsky, American nurse (died 1984)
- 1893 – Paramahansa Yogananda, Indian-American guru and philosopher (died 1952)
- 1897 – Kiyoshi Miki, Japanese philosopher and author (died 1945)
- 1900 – Yves Tanguy, French-American painter (died 1955)

=== 1901–present ===
- 1902 – Hubert Beuve-Méry, French journalist (died 1989)
- 1902 – Stella Gibbons, English journalist and author (died 1989)
- 1903 – Harold Gatty, Australian pilot and navigator (died 1957)
- 1904 – Jeane Dixon, American astrologer and psychic (died 1997)
- 1904 – Erika Morini, Austrian violinist (died 1995)
- 1906 – Kathleen Kenyon, English archaeologist and academic (died 1978)
- 1907 – Volmari Iso-Hollo, Finnish athlete (died 1969)
- 1908 – George Dolenz, Italian-American actor (died 1963)
- 1909 – Lucienne Bloch, Swiss-American sculptor, painter, and photographer (died 1995)
- 1909 – Stephen Cole Kleene, American mathematician and computer scientist (died 1994)
- 1910 – Jack Lovelock, New Zealand runner and journalist (died 1949)
- 1911 – Jean-Pierre Aumont, French actor and screenwriter (died 2001)
- 1914 – Doug Deitz, Australian rugby league player (died 1994)
- 1914 – George Reeves, American actor and director (died 1959)
- 1915 – Arthur H. Robinson, Canadian geographer and cartographer (died 2004)
- 1917 – Francis L. Kellogg, American businessman and diplomat (died 2006)
- 1917 – Wieland Wagner, German director and producer (died 1966)
- 1917 – Jane Wyman, American actress (died 2007)
- 1919 – Hector Abhayavardhana, Sri Lankan theorist and politician (died 2012)
- 1919 – Severino Gazzelloni, Italian flute player (died 1992)
- 1920 – Arturo Benedetti Michelangeli, Italian pianist and educator (died 1995)
- 1921 – Friedrich Dürrenmatt, Swiss author and playwright (died 1990)
- 1921 – Jean, Grand Duke of Luxembourg, Luxembourgish soldier and aristocrat (died 2019)
- 1921 – John H. Reed, American politician and diplomat, 67th Governor of Maine (died 2012)
- 1922 – Anthony Synnot, Australian admiral (died 2001)
- 1923 – Virginia Halas McCaskey, American football executive (died 2025)
- 1923 – Sam Phillips, American radio host and producer, founded Sun Records (died 2003)
- 1925 – Lou Carnesecca, American basketball player and coach (died 2024)
- 1926 – Joshua Benjamin Jeyaretnam, Singaporean lawyer and politician (died 2008)
- 1926 – Veikko Karvonen, Finnish runner (died 2007)
- 1926 – W. D. Snodgrass, American poet (died 2009)
- 1926 – Hosea Williams, American businessman and activist (died 2000)
- 1927 – Sivaya Subramuniyaswami, American guru and author, founded Iraivan Temple (died 2001)
- 1928 – Imtiaz Ahmed, Pakistani cricketer (died 2016)
- 1928 – Zulfikar Ali Bhutto, Pakistani lawyer and politician, 4th President of Pakistan (died 1979)
- 1928 – Denise Bryer, English actress (died 2021)
- 1928 – Walter Mondale, American soldier, lawyer, and politician, 42nd Vice President of the United States (died 2021)
- 1929 – Aulis Rytkönen, Finnish footballer and manager (died 2014)
- 1930 – Kevin Considine, Australian rugby league player (died 2023)
- 1931 – Alvin Ailey, American dancer and choreographer, founded the Alvin Ailey American Dance Theater (died 1989)
- 1931 – Alfred Brendel, Austrian pianist, poet, and author (died 2025)
- 1931 – Walt Davis, American athlete (died 2020)
- 1931 – Robert Duvall, American actor and director (died 2026)
- 1932 – Umberto Eco, Italian novelist, literary critic, and philosopher (died 2016)
- 1932 – Chuck Noll, American football player and coach (died 2014)
- 1934 – Murli Manohar Joshi, Indian politician
- 1934 – Phil Ramone, South African-American songwriter and producer, co-founded A & R Recording (died 2013)
- 1936 – Florence King, American journalist and memoirist (died 2016)
- 1936 – Terry Lineen, New Zealand rugby player (died 2020)
- 1938 – Juan Carlos I of Spain
- 1938 – Ngũgĩ wa Thiong'o, Kenyan author and playwright (died 2025)
- 1939 – M. E. H. Maharoof, Sri Lankan politician (died 1997)
- 1940 – Athol Guy, Australian singer-songwriter and bassist
- 1940 – Pim de la Parra, Surinamese-Dutch film director (died 2024)
- 1941 – Bob Cunis, New Zealand cricketer (died 2008)
- 1941 – Chuck McKinley, American tennis player (died 1986)
- 1941 – Hayao Miyazaki, Japanese animator, director, and screenwriter
- 1941 – Mansoor Ali Khan Pataudi, Indian cricketer and coach (died 2011)
- 1942 – Maurizio Pollini, Italian pianist and conductor (died 2024)
- 1942 – Charlie Rose, American journalist and talk show host
- 1942 – Jaber Al-Mubarak Al-Hamad Al-Sabah, Kuwaiti royal and politician, 7th Prime Minister of Kuwait (died 2024)
- 1943 – Mary Gaudron, Australian lawyer and judge
- 1943 – Murtaz Khurtsilava, Georgian footballer and manager
- 1944 – Carolyn McCarthy, American nurse and politician (died 2025)
- 1944 – Ed Rendell, American politician, 45th Governor of Pennsylvania
- 1946 – Diane Keaton, American actress, director, and businesswoman (died 2025)
- 1947 – Mike DeWine, American lawyer and politician, 70th Governor of Ohio
- 1947 – Mercury Morris, American football player (died 2024)
- 1948 – Ted Lange, American actor, director, and screenwriter
- 1950 – Ioan P. Culianu, Romanian historian, philosopher, and author (died 1991)
- 1950 – Peter Goldsmith, Baron Goldsmith, English lawyer and politician, Attorney General for England and Wales
- 1950 – John Manley, Canadian lawyer and politician, 8th Deputy Prime Minister of Canada
- 1950 – Chris Stein, American guitarist, songwriter, and producer
- 1952 – Uli Hoeneß, German footballer and chairman
- 1953 – Pamela Sue Martin, American actress
- 1953 – Mike Rann, English-Australian journalist and politician, 44th Premier of South Australia
- 1953 – George Tenet, American civil servant and academic, 18th Director of Central Intelligence
- 1954 – Alex English, American basketball player and coach
- 1954 – László Krasznahorkai, Hungarian author and screenwriter
- 1955 – Mamata Banerjee, Indian lawyer and politician, Chief Minister of West Bengal
- 1956 – Frank-Walter Steinmeier, German academic and politician, 12th President of Germany
- 1957 – Kevin Hastings, Australian rugby league player
- 1957 – George Moroko, Australian rugby league player
- 1958 – Jiří Hrdina, Czech ice hockey player
- 1958 – Ron Kittle, American baseball player and manager
- 1959 – Clancy Brown, American actor
- 1959 – Nancy Delahunt, Canadian curler
- 1960 – Glenn Strömberg, Swedish footballer and sportscaster
- 1961 – Iris DeMent, American singer-songwriter and guitarist
- 1962 – Suzy Amis, American actress and model
- 1962 – Danny Jackson, American baseball player and manager
- 1962 – Arie Setiabudi Soesilo, Indonesian sociologist
- 1963 – Jeff Fassero, American baseball player and coach
- 1965 – Vinnie Jones, British footballer and actor
- 1965 – Stuart Raper, Australian rugby league player and coach
- 1965 – Patrik Sjöberg, Swedish high jumper
- 1965 – Alfie Turcotte, American ice hockey player
- 1967 – Joe Flanigan, American actor
- 1968 – Carrie Ann Inaba, American actress, dancer, and choreographer
- 1968 – Joé Juneau, Canadian ice hockey player and engineer
- 1969 – Marilyn Manson, American singer-songwriter, actor, and director
- 1969 – Paul McGillion, Scottish actor
- 1969 – Shaun Micheel, American golfer
- 1969 – Shea Whigham, American actor
- 1970 – Nigel Gaffey, Australian rugby league player
- 1971 – Stian Carstensen, Norwegian multi-instrumentalist and composer
- 1972 – Sakis Rouvas, Greek singer-songwriter, producer, and actor
- 1973 – Derek Cecil, American actor
- 1973 – Uday Chopra, Indian actor and filmmaker
- 1974 – Jessica Chaffin, American actress, comedian, and writer
- 1974 – Iwan Thomas, Welsh sprinter and coach
- 1975 – Bradley Cooper, American actor and producer
- 1975 – Warrick Dunn, American football player
- 1975 – Mike Grier, American ice hockey player and scout
- 1976 – Diego Tristán, Spanish footballer
- 1977 – Gavin Lester, Australian rugby league player
- 1978 – January Jones, American actress
- 1979 – Jason Basham, American stock car racing driver
- 1979 – Kyle Calder, Canadian ice hockey player
- 1979 – Giuseppe Gibilisco, Italian pole vaulter
- 1979 – Scott Kremerskothen, Australian cricketer
- 1980 – Luke Bailey, Australian rugby league player
- 1980 – Brad Meyers, Australian rugby league player
- 1981 – Deadmau5, Canadian musician
- 1981 – Brooklyn Sudano, American actress
- 1982 – Nori Aoki, Japanese baseball player
- 1982 – Janica Kostelić, Croatian skier
- 1984 – Derrick Atkins, Bahamian sprinter
- 1984 – Matt Ballin, Australian rugby league player
- 1984 – Bronx Goodwin, Australian rugby league player
- 1985 – Filinga Filiga, New Zealand rugby league player
- 1985 – Anthony Stewart, Canadian ice hockey player
- 1985 – Diego Vera, Uruguayan footballer
- 1986 – Deepika Padukone, Indian actress
- 1987 – Dexter Bean, American race car driver
- 1987 – Kristin Cavallari, American television personality
- 1987 – Stuart Flanagan, Australian rugby league player
- 1987 – Brian Mushana Kwesiga, Ugandan-born entrepreneur, engineer, and civic leader
- 1987 – Jason Mitchell, American actor
- 1987 – Alexander Salák, Czech ice hockey player
- 1988 – Azizulhasni Awang, Malaysian track cyclist
- 1988 – Luke Daniels, English footballer
- 1988 – Mandip Gill, English actress
- 1988 – Nikola Kalinić, Croatian footballer
- 1988 – Miroslav Raduljica, Serbian basketball player
- 1989 – Eduardo Escobar, Venezuelan-American baseball player
- 1989 – Krisztián Németh, Hungarian footballer
- 1990 – C. J. Cron, American baseball player
- 1990 – Leroy Fer, Dutch footballer
- 1990 – José Iglesias, Cuban-American baseball player
- 1990 – Mark Nicholls, Australian rugby league player
- 1990 – José Luis Palomino, Argentine footballer
- 1991 – Denis Alibec, Romanian footballer
- 1991 – Eric Fisher, American football player
- 1992 – Mike Faist, American actor, singer, and dancer
- 1992 – Suki Waterhouse, English actress, singer-songwriter, and model
- 1993 – Phillip Dorsett, American football player
- 1993 – Franz Drameh, English actor
- 1993 – Stefan Rzadzinski, Canadian race car driver
- 1994 – Lachlan Fitzgibbon, Australian rugby league player
- 1994 – Zemgus Girgensons, Latvian ice hockey player
- 1994 – Matt Grzelcyk, American ice hockey player
- 1994 – Tyrone Phillips, Australian rugby league player
- 1994 – Gustavo Scarpa, Brazilian footballer
- 1995 – Toafofoa Sipley, New Zealand rugby league player
- 1996 – James Fisher-Harris, New Zealand rugby league player
- 1996 – Nicolás Tripichio, Argentine footballer
- 1996 – Tyler Ulis, American basketball player and coach
- 1997 – Jesús Vallejo, Spanish footballer
- 1998 – Carles Aleñá, Spanish footballer
- 1998 – Corey Horsburgh, Australian rugby league player
- 1999 – Mattias Svanberg, Swedish footballer
- 1999 – Filip Ugrinić, Swiss footballer
- 2000 – Gastón Martirena, Uruguayan footballer
- 2001 – Mykhailo Mudryk, Ukrainian footballer
- 2001 – Ellis Simms, English footballer
- 2004 – Shane Wright, Canadian ice hockey player
- 2009 – Walker Scobell, American actor

== Deaths ==
=== Pre-1600 ===
- 842 – Al-Mu'tasim, Abbasid caliph (born 796)
- 941 – Zhang Yanhan, Chinese chancellor (born 884)
- 1066 – Edward the Confessor, King of England (born 1004)
- 1173 – Bolesław IV the Curly, High Duke of Poland (born 1120)
- 1382 – Philippa Plantagenet, Countess of Ulster (born 1355)
- 1400 – John Montacute, 3rd Earl of Salisbury, English politician (born 1350)
- 1430 – Philippa of England, Queen of Denmark, Norway and Sweden (born 1394)
- 1477 – Charles, Duke of Burgundy (born 1433)
- 1524 – Marko Marulić, Croatian poet (born 1450)
- 1527 – Felix Manz, Swiss martyr (born 1498)
- 1578 – Giulio Clovio, Dalmatian painter (born 1498)
- 1580 – Anna Sibylle of Hanau-Lichtenberg, German noblewoman (born 1542)
- 1589 – Catherine de' Medici, queen of Henry II of France (born 1519)

=== 1601–1900 ===
- 1713 – Jean Chardin, French explorer and author (born 1643)
- 1740 – Antonio Lotti, Italian composer and educator (born 1667)
- 1762 – Empress Elizabeth of Russia (born 1709)
- 1771 – John Russell, 4th Duke of Bedford, English politician, Secretary of State for the Southern Department (born 1710)
- 1796 – Samuel Huntington, American jurist and politician, 18th Governor of Connecticut (born 1731)
- 1823 – George Johnston, Scottish-Australian colonel and politician, Lieutenant Governor of New South Wales (born 1764)
- 1845 – Robert Smirke, English painter and illustrator (born 1753)
- 1846 – Alfred Thomas Agate, American painter and illustrator (born 1812)
- 1858 – Joseph Radetzky von Radetz, Austrian field marshal (born 1766)
- 1860 – John Neumann, Czech-American bishop and saint (born 1811)
- 1883 – Charles Tompson, Australian poet and public servant (born 1806)
- 1885 – Peter Christen Asbjørnsen, Norwegian author and scholar (born 1812)
- 1888 – Henri Herz, Austrian pianist and composer (born 1803)
- 1889 – Konstanty Schmidt-Ciążyński, Polish collector and art connoisseur who donated a large collection to the National Museum in Kraków (born 1818)
- 1899 – Ezra Otis Kendall, American professor, astronomer and mathematician (born 1818)

=== 1901–present ===
- 1904 – Karl Alfred von Zittel, German paleontologist and geologist (born 1839)
- 1910 – Léon Walras, French-Swiss economist and academic (born 1834)
- 1917 – Isobel Lilian Gloag, English painter (born 1865)
- 1922 – Ernest Shackleton, Anglo-Irish sailor and explorer (born 1874)
- 1933 – Calvin Coolidge, American lawyer and politician, 30th President of the United States (born 1872)
- 1939 – Lisandro de la Torre, Argentine politician (born 1868)
- 1942 – Tina Modotti, Italian photographer, model, actress, and activist (born 1896)
- 1943 – George Washington Carver, American botanist, educator, and inventor (born 1864)
- 1951 – Soh Jaipil, South Korean-American journalist and activist (born 1864)
- 1951 – Andrei Platonov, Russian journalist and author (born 1899)
- 1952 – Victor Hope, 2nd Marquess of Linlithgow, Scottish colonel and politician, 46th Governor-General of India (born 1887)
- 1952 – Hristo Tatarchev, Bulgarian-Italian physician and activist (born 1869)
- 1954 – Rabbit Maranville, American baseball player and manager (born 1891)
- 1956 – Mistinguett, French actress and singer (born 1875)
- 1963 – Rogers Hornsby, American baseball player, coach, and manager (born 1896)
- 1970 – Max Born, German physicist and mathematician, Nobel Prize laureate (born 1882)
- 1970 – Roberto Gerhard, Catalan composer and scholar (born 1896)
- 1971 – Douglas Shearer, Canadian-American sound designer and engineer (born 1899)
- 1974 – Lev Oborin, Russian pianist and educator (born 1907)
- 1976 – John A. Costello, Irish lawyer and politician, 3rd Taoiseach of Ireland (born 1891)
- 1978 – Wyatt Emory Cooper, American author and screenwriter (born 1927)
- 1979 – Billy Bletcher, American actor, singer, and screenwriter (born 1894)
- 1979 – Charles Mingus, American bassist, composer, bandleader (born 1922)
- 1981 – Harold Urey, American chemist and astronomer, Nobel Prize laureate (born 1893)
- 1981 – Lanza del Vasto, Italian poet and philosopher (born 1901)
- 1982 – Hans Conried, American actor (born 1917)
- 1982 – Edmund Herring, Australian general and politician, 7th Chief Justice of Victoria (born 1892)
- 1985 – Eithne Coyle, Irish Republican, President of Cumann na mBan (born 1897)
- 1985 – Robert L. Surtees, American cinematographer (born 1906)
- 1987 – Margaret Laurence, Canadian author and academic (born 1926)
- 1987 – Herman Smith-Johannsen, Norwegian-Canadian skier (born 1875)
- 1990 – Arthur Kennedy, American actor (born 1914)
- 1991 – Vasko Popa, Serbian poet and academic (born 1922)
- 1994 – Tip O'Neill, American lawyer and politician, 55th Speaker of the United States House of Representatives (born 1912)
- 1996 – Thung Sin Nio, Dutch–Indonesian activist (born 1902)
- 1997 – André Franquin, Belgian author and illustrator (born 1924)
- 1997 – Burton Lane, American composer and songwriter (born 1912)
- 1998 – Sonny Bono, American singer-songwriter, producer, actor, and politician (born 1935)
- 2000 – Kumar Ponnambalam, Sri Lankan Tamil lawyer and politician (born 1938)
- 2003 – Roy Jenkins, Welsh politician, Chancellor of the Exchequer (born 1920)
- 2003 – Félix Loustau, Argentine footballer (born 1922)
- 2004 – Norman Heatley, English biologist and chemist, co-developed penicillin (born 1911)
- 2006 – Merlyn Rees, Welsh educator and politician, Home Secretary (born 1920)
- 2007 – Momofuku Ando, Taiwanese-Japanese businessman and inventor, founded Nissin Foods (born 1910)
- 2009 – Griffin Bell, American lawyer and politician, 72nd United States Attorney General (born 1918)
- 2010 – Willie Mitchell, American singer-songwriter, trumpet player, and producer (born 1928)
- 2010 – Kenneth Noland, American painter (born 1924)
- 2012 – Isaac Díaz Pardo, Spanish painter and sculptor (born 1920)
- 2012 – Frederica Sagor Maas, American author, playwright, and screenwriter (born 1900)
- 2013 – Qazi Hussain Ahmad, Pakistani scholar and politician (born 1938)
- 2014 – Eusébio, Mozambican-Portuguese footballer and manager (born 1942)
- 2014 – Carmen Zapata, American actress (born 1927)
- 2015 – Jean-Pierre Beltoise, French racing driver and motorcycle racer (born 1937)
- 2015 – Bernard Joseph McLaughlin, American bishop (born 1912)
- 2016 – Pierre Boulez, French pianist, composer, and conductor (born 1925)
- 2017 – Jill Saward, English rape victim and activist (born 1965)
- 2018 – Asghar Khan, Pakistani three star general and politician (born 1921)
- 2018 – Thomas Bopp, American astronomer best known as the co-discoverer of comet Hale–Bopp (born 1949)
- 2018 – Karin von Aroldingen, German ballerina (born 1941)
- 2019 – Bernice Sandler, American women's rights activist (born 1928)
- 2019 – Dragoslav Šekularac, Serbian footballer and manager (born 1937)
- 2020 – Tafazzul Haque Habiganji, Bangladeshi Islamic scholar and politician (born 1938)
- 2021 – Colin Bell, English footballer (born 1946)
- 2021 – John Georgiadis, English violinist and composer (born 1939)
- 2022 – Kim Mi-soo, South Korean actress and model (born 1992)
- 2024 – Joseph Lelyveld, American journalist and executive editor of The New York Times (born 1937)
- 2024 – Mário Zagallo, Brazilian footballer and manager (born 1931)
- 2025 – Mike Rinder, Australian-American former Scientologist, critic (born 1955)
- 2025 – Costas Simitis, Greek economist, lawyer, and politician, Prime Minister of Greece (born 1936)

== Holidays and observances ==
- Christian Feast day:
  - Charles of Mount Argus
  - John Neumann (Catholic Church)
  - Pope Telesphorus
  - Simeon Stylites (Latin Church)
  - January 5 (Eastern Orthodox liturgics)
- Harbin International Ice and Snow Sculpture Festival (Harbin, China)
- Joma Shinji (Japan)
- National Bird Day (United States)
- The Twelfth day of Christmas and the Twelfth Night of Christmas. (Western Christianity)
