= Association of British Muslims =

British Muslim organization

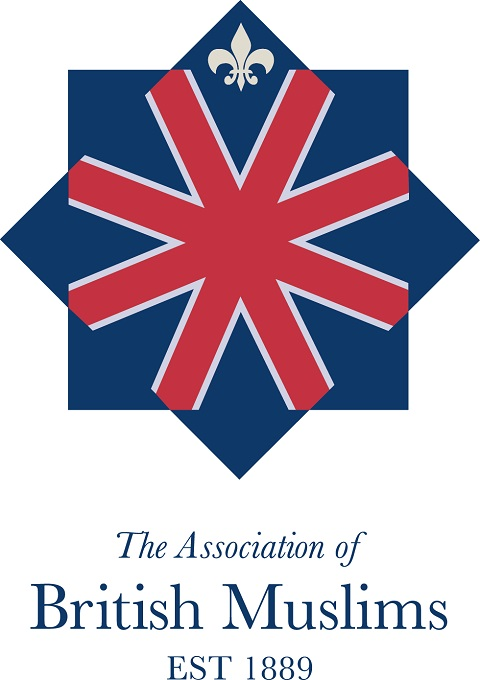
- Abbreviation: AoBM (previously, ABM)
- Founded: 1889
- Founder: Abdullah Quilliam
- Location: United Kingdom
- Website: aobm.org

The Association of British Muslims (AoBM) is an organization of British Muslims, initially founded in 1889 by Abdullah Quilliam.

== History ==
The Association of British Muslims began in Liverpool, England as the English Islamic Association, founded in 1889 by Abdullah Quilliam, a 19th-century convert to Islam who opened one of England's first mosques, the Liverpool Muslim Institute, during the same year, at about the same time that the Shah Jahan Mosque was built. AoBM changed their name to the British Muslim Society in 1914 and to the Western Islamic Association in 1924. It declined in the late 1940s, was opposed by nationality-based organizations of British Muslims in 1969, and became the Association of British Muslims in 1975. The name Association for British Muslims was also used for sometime after 1978.

== Leadership ==
Daoud Rosser-Owen (1943–2021) was for many years the Amir of AoBM, after spearheading the revival of the organization in 1976. Paul Salahuddin Armstrong is the Managing Director and appointed Mohammed Abbasi as the Chief of Operations. Professor Joel Hayward, one of the world's most influential Muslims, is also a member of the AoBM management board and serves as Director of Leadership and Academic Affairs.

== Stance on Social and Ethical Issues ==
=== Fatwa Against Female Genital Mutilation (FGM) ===
Fatwa on FGM issued by the Association of British Muslims on 12 December 2013.

The Association of British Muslims (AoBM) has long been committed to addressing social and ethical issues that affect Muslim communities in the UK and beyond. One of the most significant contributions has been the issuing of a fatwa against Female Genital Mutilation.

=== Condemnation of Terrorism and Extremism ===
After the tragic Woolwich attack in 2013, AoBM condemned the violence and asserting that such acts are fundamentally at odds with the principles of Islam.

AoBM also played a role in the issuance of a fatwa against the so-called "Islamic State" (ISIS) in 2014, labeling its ideology as a toxic distortion of the faith. This declaration, which was part of a larger effort to counter extremist narratives, helped to clarify the position of mainstream Islam against radicalism. The fatwa not only garnered national attention but also contributed to the broader international discourse on the dangers posed by extremist ideologies.

=== Advocacy for Social Cohesion and Multifaith Dialogue ===
AoBM joined other Muslim organizations in placing full-page ads in national newspapers to denounce antisemitism. This effort was widely lauded as a powerful statement of solidarity and a commitment to combating all forms of hatred, regardless of its target.

AoBM's engagement in multifaith dialogue extends beyond statements. The organization has been actively involved in partnerships and campaigns that promote inclusivity and mutual respect. In collaboration with the Naz and Matt Foundation, AoBM has supported initiatives aimed at addressing homophobia within religious communities, advocating for the acceptance and protection of LGBTQ+ individuals.

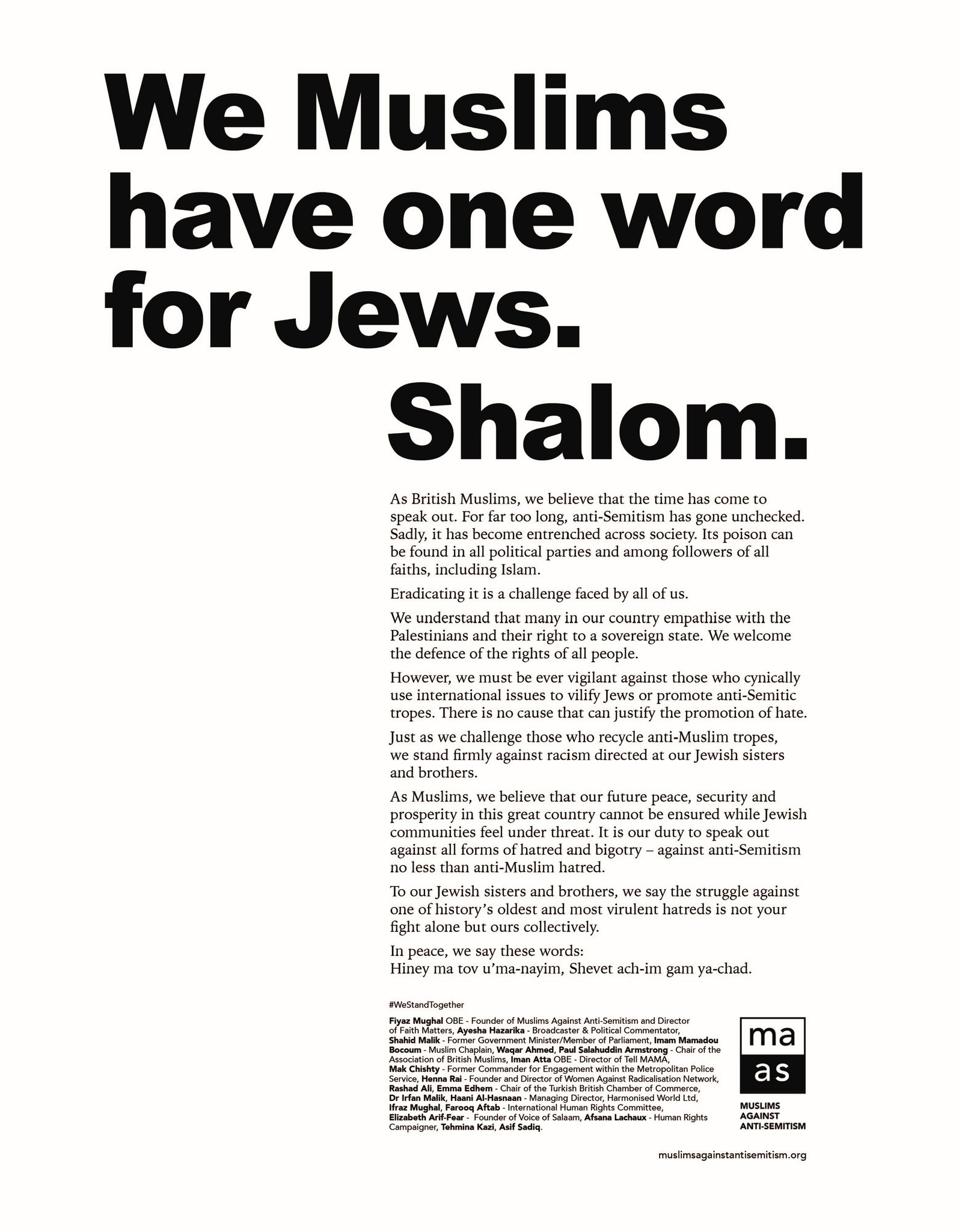
Statement published in the Times and Telegraph newspapers by Muslim leaders in the UK, "We Muslims have one word for Jews. Shalom." (18 May 2018)

=== Universal Human Rights ===
In late 2010, the United Nations General Assembly Resolution on Extrajudicial, Summary or Arbitrary Executions, which had previously included protections against executions based on various forms of discrimination, including sexual orientation. The amendment removed the specific reference to sexual orientation. The AoBM expressed concern about this change, stating, "Removing this clause at this time could send an unintended message to regimes that engage in these practices, suggesting that the United Nations may be less focused on the treatment of individuals based on their sexual orientation." The Gay and Lesbian Humanist Association supported the AoBM's statement.

In February 2011, AoBM criticised homophobic stickers that appeared in East London. Then Co-director, Paul Salahuddin Armstrong stated, "There is nothing in the Qur'an against LGBT people. Allah has honoured every son/daughter of Adam, so such a hateful message is not only morally and ethically wrong but actually unislamic."

=== Response to Social Issues ===
In response to the Church of England’s decision to bless same-sex marriages, AoBM issued a statement highlighting the potential impact on interfaith relations and the broader societal implications. The association emphasized the need for respectful dialogue on sensitive issues that affect both religious and secular communities.

== International Engagement ==
=== Engagement with the Indonesian Muslim Community ===
Recognizing the importance of global Muslim solidarity, AoBM has worked to strengthen ties with Muslim communities around the world, particularly in Indonesia. The organization has actively participated in events that celebrate the rich cultural and religious heritage shared between British and Indonesian Muslims. A notable example is AoBM's involvement in the centenary celebrations of Nahdlatul Ulama (NU) in Surabaya and London, which underscored the deep connections between the two communities.

AoBM has also engaged in educational exchanges, where insights from the British Muslim experience are shared with Indonesian audiences, and vice versa. These exchanges have included public lectures and discussions on how Islam can be practiced within secular societies while maintaining its core values. Additionally, AoBM's leaders have acknowledged their spiritual connections to Indonesian scholars.

== Contributions to National and International Discourse ==
The organization has participated in debates around issues such as the representation of ethnic diversity in British public life, including campaigns advocating for greater diversity on British banknotes.

The organization condemned the recent attacks on Hindus in Bangladesh.

AoBM's influence extends to digital platforms as well, where it has utilized social media and other online channels to reach a broader audience.
