= The Crescent (newspaper) =

Islamic newspaper in the United Kingdom

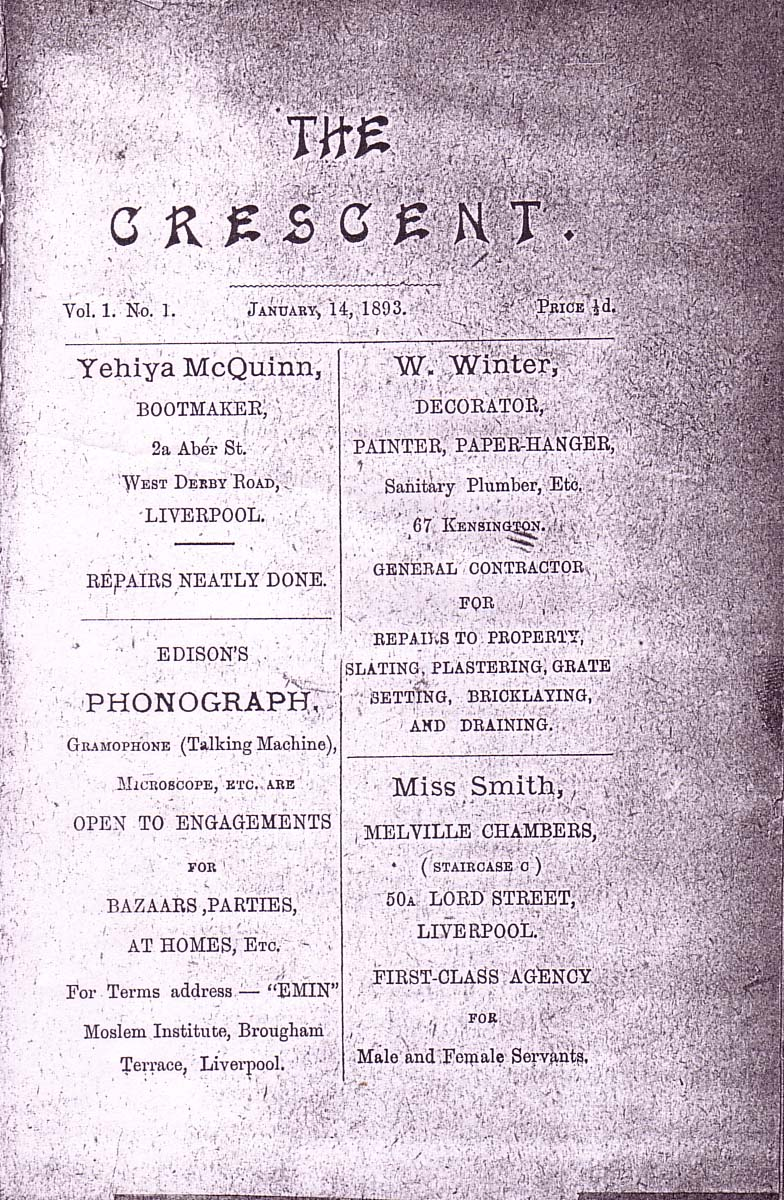
First edition of The Crescent 14 January 1893

The Crescent was an Islamic newspaper published in the United Kingdom from 1893 to 1908.

== History ==
1893 to 1908

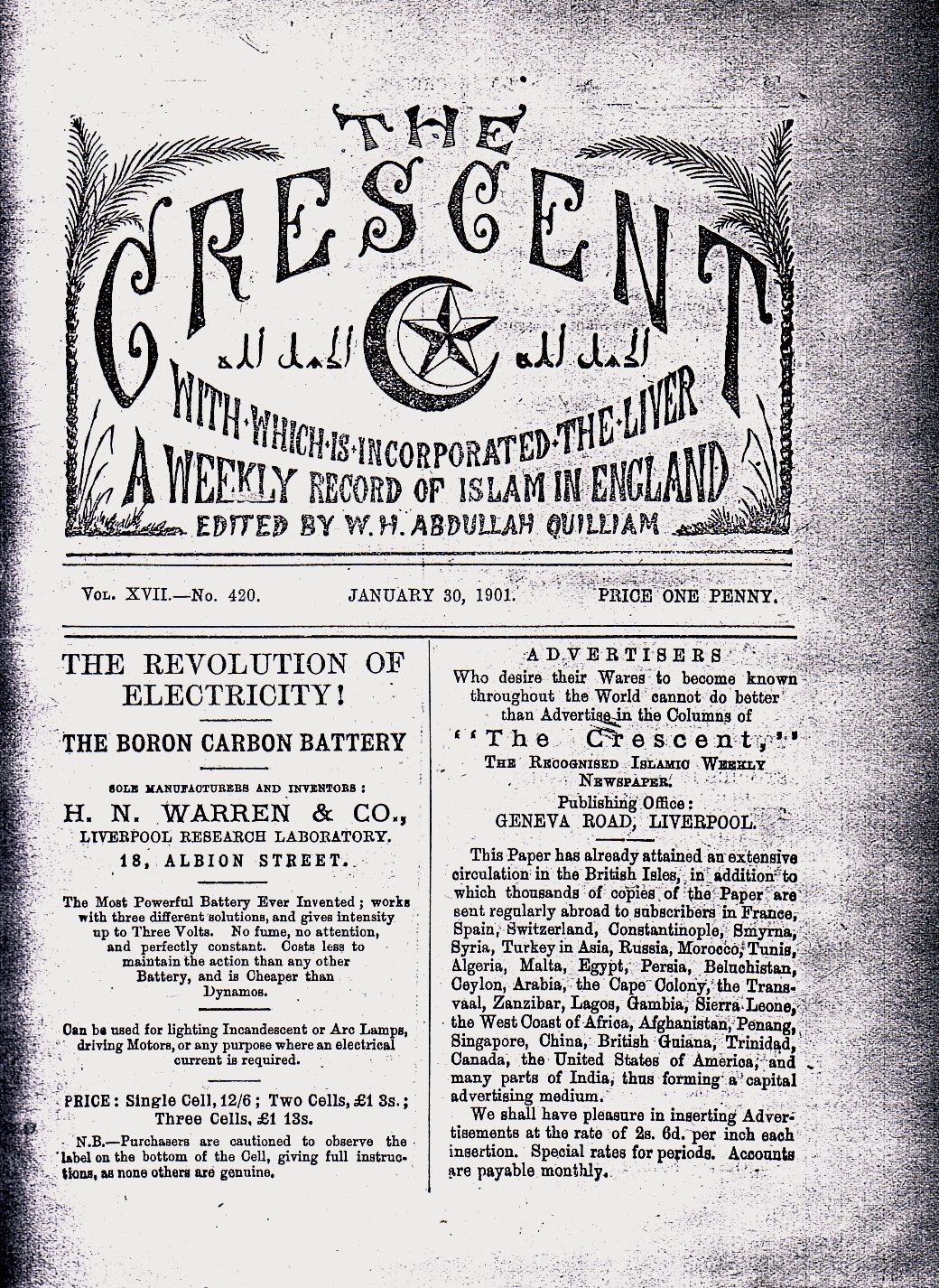
The Crescent 30 January 1901 vol. 16 no. 420

The Crescent - a weekly record of Islam in England was originally published weekly in Liverpool from 1893. As such, it can claim to be oldest and first regular publication reflecting and serving the early convert and Muslim community within the British Isles, although its readership quickly grew via subscription to a global community. The first edition was published on 14 January 1893 from 32 Elizabeth Street, Liverpool, shortly before moving to Brougham Terrace. It was edited by W. H. Abdullah Quilliam and represented Muslims in England and growing convert community between 1893 and 1908.

A statement in The Crescent to its advertisers in 1908 declared that "in addition to the thousands of copies in circulation within the British Isles, in addition to which thousands of copies of the Paper are sent regularly abroad to subscribers in France, Spain, Switzerland, Constantinople, Smyrna, Syria, Turkey in Asia, Russia, Morocco, Tunis, Algeria, Malta, Egypt, Persia, Beluchistan, Ceylon, Arabia, the Cape Colony, the Transvaal, Zanzibar, Lagos, Gambia, Sierra Leone, the west Coast of Africa, Afghanistan, Penang, Singapore, China, British Guiana, Trinidad, Canada, the United States of America, and many parts of India, this forming a capital advertising medium". The advertising rate was stated as being 2s. 6d. per inch per insertion.

After outgrowing the Muslim prayer hall established by Quilliam in Mount Vernon, Liverpool, in 1888 he rented 8 Brougham Terrace and also acquired the neighbouring properties, numbers 10 and 12 in 1889, and in the basement a printing press was established to produce the monthly editions of The Islamic World, which was subscribed to globally. In 1893, it evolved into the weekly publication The Crescent - a weekly record of Islam in England.

Plans were announced for a purpose-built mosque to be built to the design of J. H. McGovern on the site of 10 and 12 Brougham Terrace, but did not materialise, any more than did those of 1902, for a mosque in the community's new centre at Geneva Road, Elm Park, Liverpool where The Crescent continued to be published until May 1908.

The Crescent newspaper is a social history of a growing Muslim convert community. Such names as Yahya McQuinn, T. Omar Byrne, Fatima Cates, Yahya Nasser Parkinson, Nasrullah Warren, J. Bokhari Jeffery, and Omar Roberts appear regularly in the editorial, but the wider community would include Lord Stanley of Alderley, Hasan El-Arculli a Muslim G.P. and many others.

== 2003 relaunch ==
A 12-page tabloid format was launched in 2003 but failed due to the overheads of printing and distributing a community-based paper

== 2022 relaunch ==
The Crescent was relaunched in 1444 AH (August 2022) as an on-line newspaper. It appeared as both printed and on-line editions. It is planned to publish the paper monthly on the first Friday of each new lunar month and move to a fortnightly publication thereafter. The Crescent newspaper's target audience was the indigenous English-speaking and convert Muslim community resident within the UK and Ireland, but access via the Internet opened the readership to the English-speaking world. The Crescent newspaper was independent, community-based and not aligned to any political party.

== See also ==
- Abdullah Quilliam Society

== The Crescent archives 1893-1908 ==
The Abdullah Quilliam Society have digital archives online for the years 1893-1908

The Crescent newspaper is archived on microfilm at the British Library and is complete except for 1894

The Catalogue reference is given as:

Title: The Crescent - A weekly record of Islam in England
Publication Details: Liverpool
Uniform Title: The Crescent (Liverpool, England : 1893)
Place Name: Liverpool
Identifier: System number 013898565
Notes: Discontinued.
Wanting 1894.
Creation Date: 1893
UIN: BLL01013898565
Publication Details: Liverpool
Uniform Title: The Crescent (Liverpool, England : 1893)
Place Name: Liverpool
Identifier: System number 013898565
Notes: Discontinued.
Wanting 1894.
Creation Date: 1893
UIN: BLL01013898565
