= Fatima Cates =

British Muslim convert and activist (1865–1900)

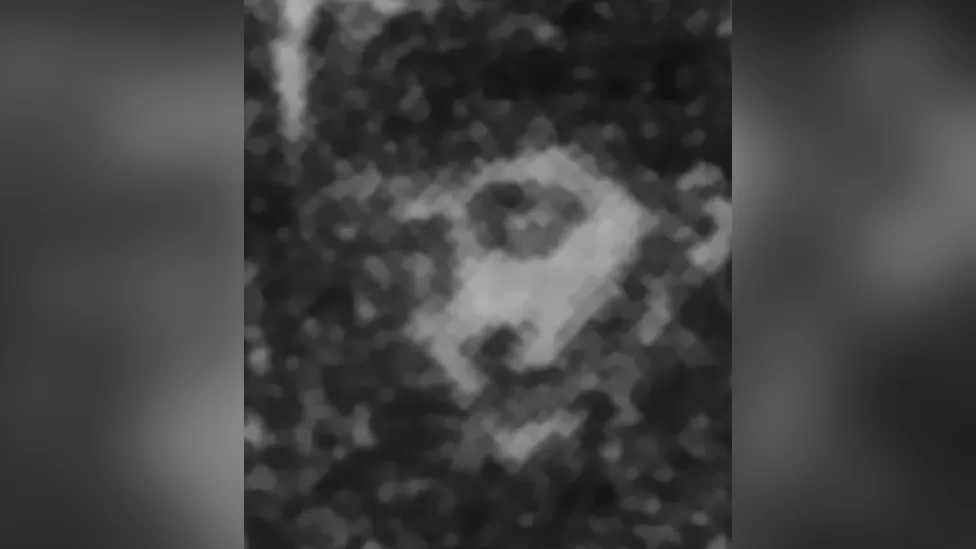
- Born: Frances Elizabeth Murray; 5 January 1865; Birkenhead, England
- Died: 29 October 1900 (aged 35)
- Burial place: Anfield Cemetery
- Other names: Fatima Elizabeth Cates

Fatima Elizabeth Cates (born Frances Elizabeth Murray; 5 January 1865 – 29 October 1900) was a British Muslim convert and activist, who co-founded the Liverpool Muslim Institute. She was one of the first women in Britain to convert to Islam.

== Early life ==
Frances Elizabeth Murray was born on 5 January 1865 in Birkenhead into a strict Christian family. Her parents were Agnes (née Mitchell) and John Murray, an Irish porter who worked at the nearby Birkenhead Market. When she was 5, her father died from presumed pulmonary tuberculosis and her mother married stone mason Peter Cottam three years later.

== Conversion to Islam ==
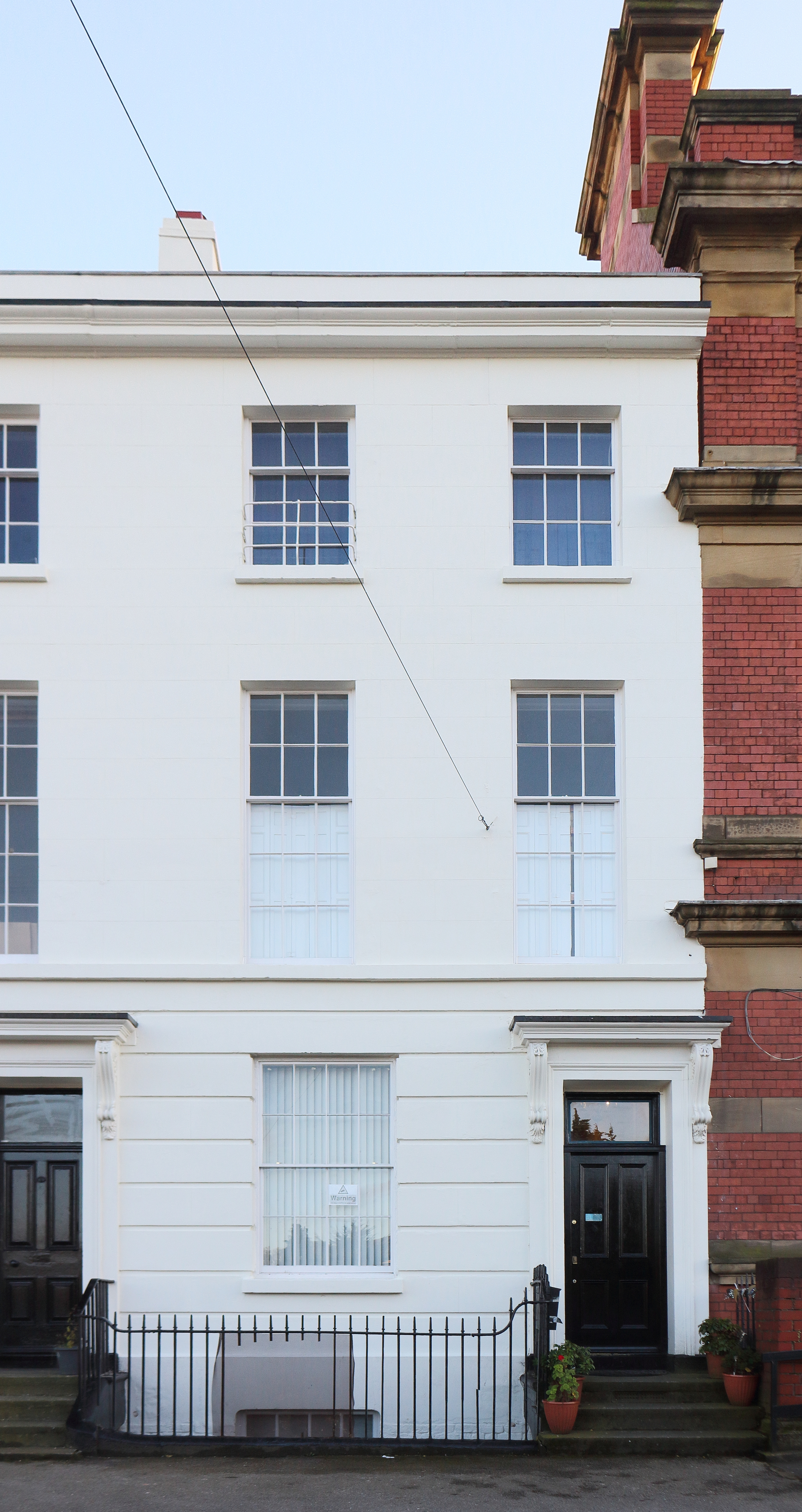
8 Brougham Terrace, site of the Liverpool Muslim Institute

By the time she was 19, she had become a temperance activist and was the secretary of the Association of Prohibition of Alcohol in Birkenhead. Through this she attended a public talk by Abdullah Quilliam about "The Great Arabian Teetotaller", where she questioned Quilliam about Muhammad's views on women and alcohol, which challenged some of her previous held beliefs. In response, Quilliam gave her a copy of the Quran, telling her "don't believe what I say or what anyone else says; study the matter out for yourself". When her mother discovered the book, she said "How dare you read such a vile and wicked book? Give it to me this moment and let me burn it. I will not allow such trash to be in my house" and attempted to burn it, but Cates managed to escape to her bedroom to continue reading it and always carried it with her in fear of what her mother might do it if she left it unattended.

Cates stayed in contact with Quilliam and attended his meetings at a house on Mount Vernon Street, despite facing strong opposition from her family and on one occasion being pinned down and horse manure rubbed on her face. In July 1887, she officially converted and took the shahada, and changed her name to Fatima after Muhammad's daughter. Two years later, Quilliam, Cates and other converts moved to a permanent location at Brougham Terrace on West Derby Street in Liverpool, where they founded the first recorded mosque in England. Cates was elected as its first treasurer. However, she was demoted in 1893 and was instead assigned to oversee the development of a Muslim day school for girls. She was also a member of the Liverpool Muslim Institute's Ladies Committee until 1896.

Since her conversion, she wrote about Islam and the Liverpool Muslim Institute to many publications and newspapers. As well as that, she also wrote poetry, including her 1892 poem "A Moslimah's Prayer", which was the only composition by a Muslim women included in the LMI's hymnal. Cates also wrote a poem dedicated to Shah Jahan Begum of Bhopal. In 1890, Cates sent a letter to Muslim activist Moulvi Hassan Ali on how to increase the number of Muslim converts in Britain.

== Personal life ==
In 1889, she married marine engineer Hubert Henry Cates at the Cathedral Church of St. Peter in Liverpool. Hubert was at first adverse to her faith, but she managed to convince him, and her two sisters Annie and Clara to convert. However, she filed for divorce in 1891, citing adultery and abuse on her husband's part, stating he had a "violent and uncontrollable temper" and had assaulted and attempted to kill her. She was a granted a year's separation but the couple continued to live apart until Hubert's death in 1895.

In 1896, she gave birth to Hubert Haleem Cates, and it was speculated that he was fathered by Quilliam and that Fatima had become his secret third wife in 1895.

== Death ==
Cates fell ill with a cold on 24 October 1900, and her condition had deteriorated by 29 October and Quilliam was summoned. Cates requested that he take care of her son and conduct her funeral. She died later that day, at the age of 35. Cates was buried at Anfield Cemetery on 31 October.
