= Al-Manar Centre =

Mosque in Cardiff, Wales

Coordinates: 51°29′16.5″N 3°10′32″W

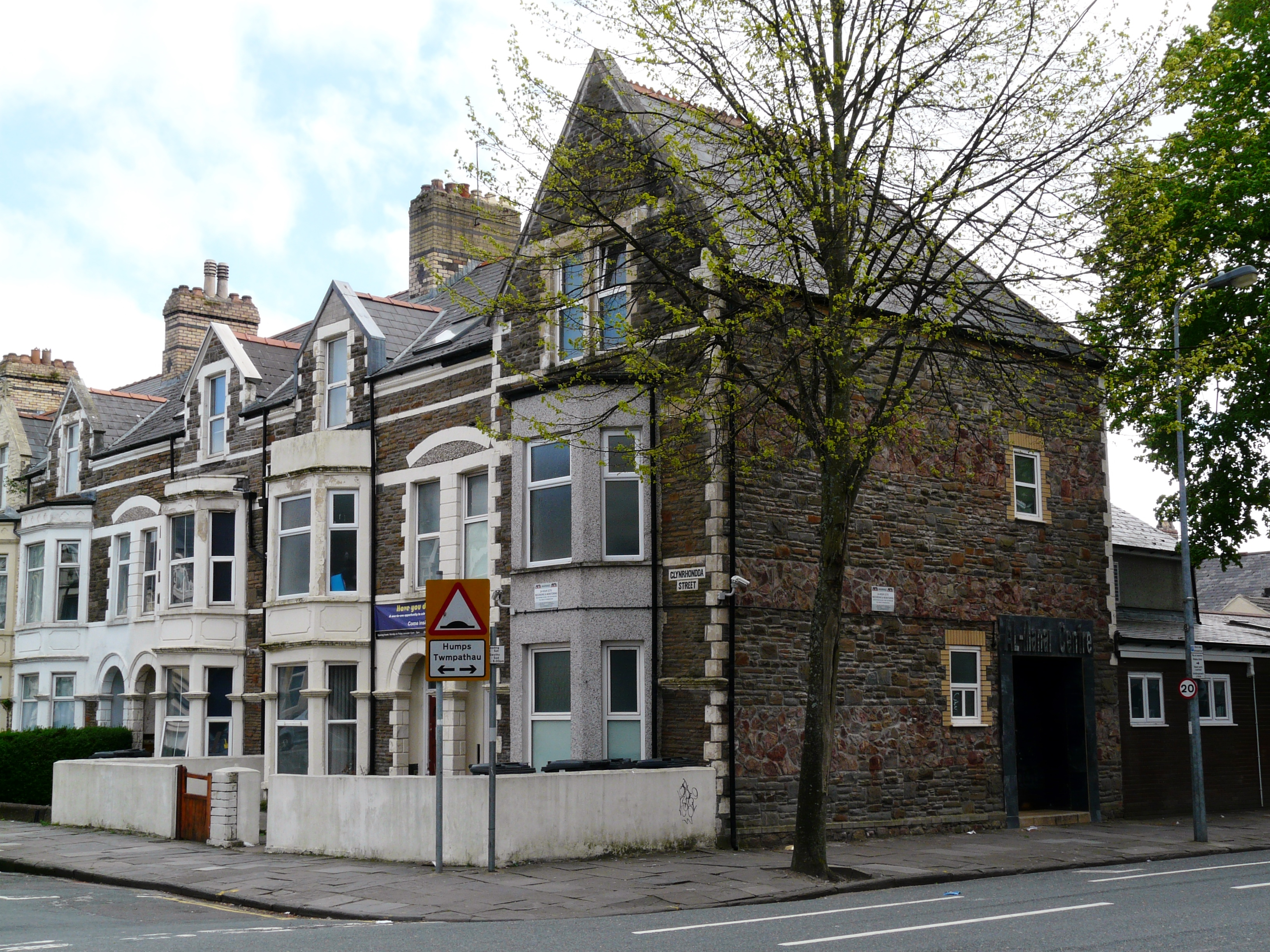

Location
- Location: Cathays, Cardiff, Wales, United Kingdom
- Interactive map of Al-Manar Centre

Architecture
- Type: Mosque
- Established: 1992

The al-Manar Centre (sometimes referred to as 2 Glynrhondda Street) is a Sunni mosque in the Cathays district of Cardiff, Wales.

== History ==
Founded in 1992, it describes itself as being "one of [the] Ahlus-Sunnah organisations". A widely circulated claim holds that a mosque was registered at this address in 1860, which would make the Al-Manar Centre the oldest mosque in the United Kingdom. This has, however, been shown to result from a transcription error in the Register of Religious Sites, making the Liverpool Muslim Institute, established in 1891, the first.

In 2014, the mosque became the subject of media attention after it emerged that Nasser Muthana and Reyaad Khan, two young men who appeared in a propaganda video for the Islamic State of Iraq and the Levant, and Muthana's brother Aseel, also fighting in Syria for the same organisation, had worshipped at the mosque. The centre denied that it had played any part in their radicalisation. Aseel was interviewed by ITV News in Syria in July 2014 and denied being radicalized at the mosque, stating his brother Nasser had taught him about jihad when he was young. He said, "I was always pro-jihad but didn’t approach the local imams or my parents because we knew it would brought [sic] us trouble." Reyaad Khan was killed in a targeted drone strike in Syria in July 2015.

In July 2025, the UK Charity Commission issued a formal warning to the Al-Manar Centre Trust following an investigation into a video shared on the charity's social media in November 2023. The video, posted shortly after the 7 October attacks, was found to present a "positive image" of Hamas, a proscribed terrorist organization in the UK, and to downplay or justify the attack on Israel. The inquiry concluded that the conduct amounted to "misconduct and/or mismanagement" by trustees, particularly the chair, who had shared the content after listening only to its audio.

The UK Charity Commission determined that the video was likely to cause the public to infer support for terrorism. It also found that the trustees had failed to implement adequate social media controls despite prior regulatory advice. As a result, the Commission issued a legal order requiring a full review of the charity's digital content and stricter oversight measures going forward.

== See also ==
- Islam in Wales
