= Robert Stanley (mayor) =

British grocer and mayor of Stalybridge, Manchester (1828–1911)

Robert Reschid Stanley
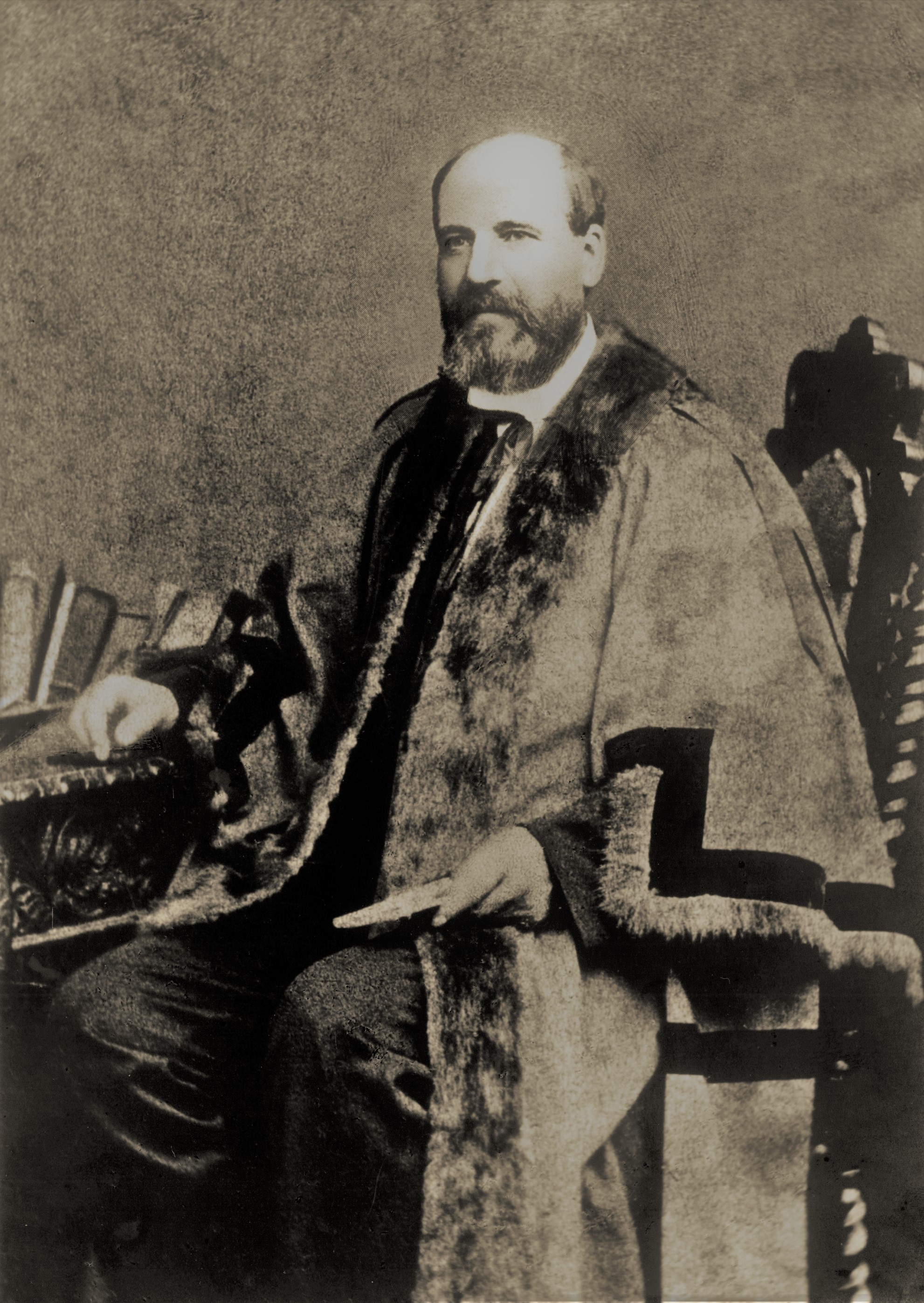

Personal details
- Born: c. 1828 Cardiff, Wales
- Died: 1911 (aged 82–83) Stalybridge, England
- Citizenship: British
- Party: Conservative
- Spouse: Emma Meredith (m. 1847; died 1911)
- Children: 11
- Occupation: Politician

Robert Reschid Stanley (1828–1911) was a British grocer, tea trader and mayor (1874–76) of Stalybridge, near Manchester. He is best known for his conversion to Islam. As a Muslim, he served as vice chair at the Liverpool Muslim Institute.

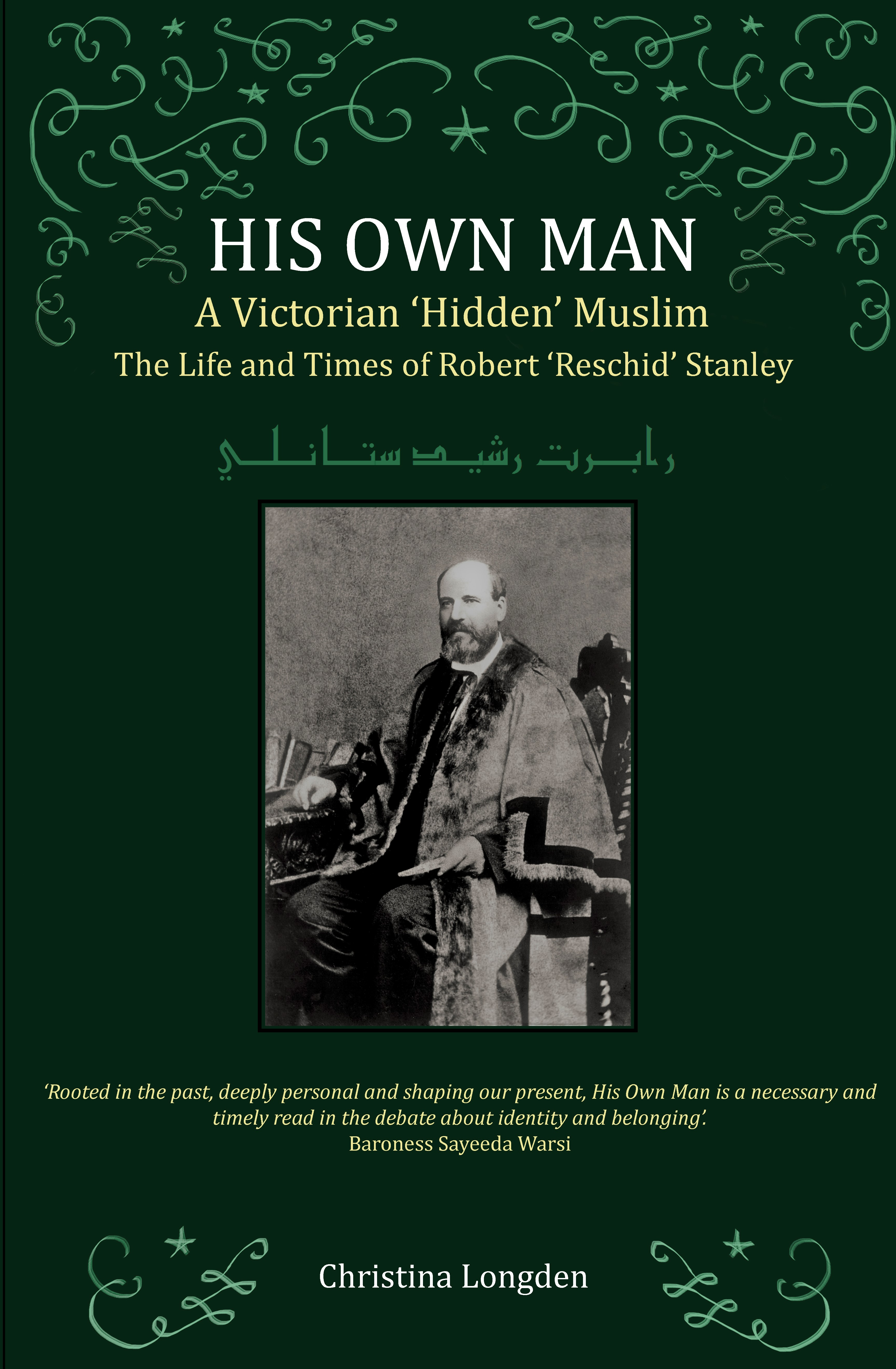

== Early life ==
Robert Stanley was born in 1828 in Cardiff. He was sent from Cardiff at the age of 10 to be an apprentice at his Christian Israelite uncle's shop in Ashton-under-Lyne. When he was 19 years old, he established a grocer's shop and a tea-trading business in Stalybridge.

== Career ==
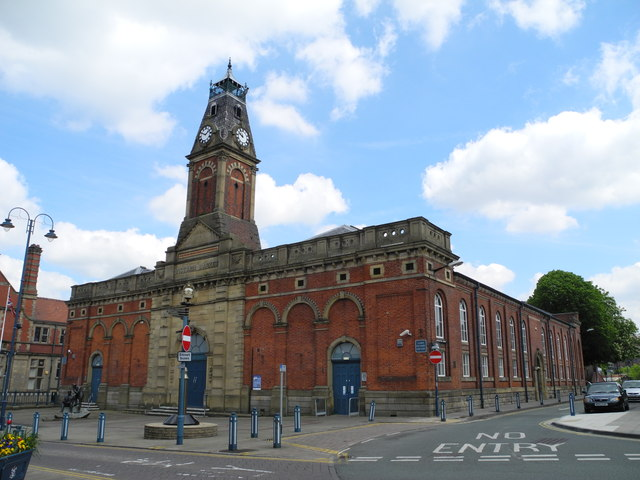
Victoria Market, Stalybridge

Stanley was first elected in 1863 as a councillor for the Dukinfield Ward of Stalybridge. In 1867, he became a Justice of the Peace. Two years later, he became councillor for the Stayley Ward of Stalybridge. He was also elected on the School Board of Stalybridge in 1871. He served as the chairman of the building committee which helped in construction of the new Victoria Market, now known as the Stalybridge Civic Hall.

In 1874, he became the mayor of Stalybridge and served until 1876. He served on the Joint Waterworks Committee in the construction of the Yeoman Hey Reservoir which was intended to bring fresh water to the towns of Oldham, Ashton-under-Lyne and Stalybridge. he was one of the original Trustees of Stamford Park which was built in 1873, when money was raised by the people of Dukinfield, Stalybridge and Ashton during the municipal socialist reforms of the era. In 1876, Robert attracted controversy in Parliament when he refused to call a public meeting to discuss the 'Bulgarian Atrocities' which the Ottoman Empire had been accused of.

In 1898, at the age of 69, he converted to Islam and, as was the case with many of the British Muslim convert community, adopted the name 'Reschid'. He was the owner of the New Inn, a pub in Ashton-upon-Lyne which he sold prior to his conversion.

His path towards conversion has been researched by his great-great-great-granddaughter, Christina Longden in books His Own Man and Imagining Robert. Longden gives presentations and talks about Stanley's life and British Islam. In 1999, Stanley's great-great-grandson, Brian Longden, was researching his family history and discovered that Stanley had converted to Islam; Brian's own son, had himself converted in 1991, knowing nothing about his ancestor.

After his conversion, he was appointed by his friend, William Abdullah Quilliam, Shaykh al-Islām of the British Isles, to serve as the vice-president of the Liverpool Muslim Institute, arguably the first mosque in the United Kingdom. Stanley became a supporter of the Ottoman Empire and corresponded with the Caliph, Abdul Hamid II, advising him on agricultural, industrial and military matters.

He died, aged 83, in 1911 in his home town of Stalybridge.

== Personal life ==
Stanley was previously a member of the Christian Israelite Church. He married Emma Meredith on 17 October 1847 in the Christian Israelite Sanctuary. They had 11 children.
