= Arie Setiabudi Soesilo =

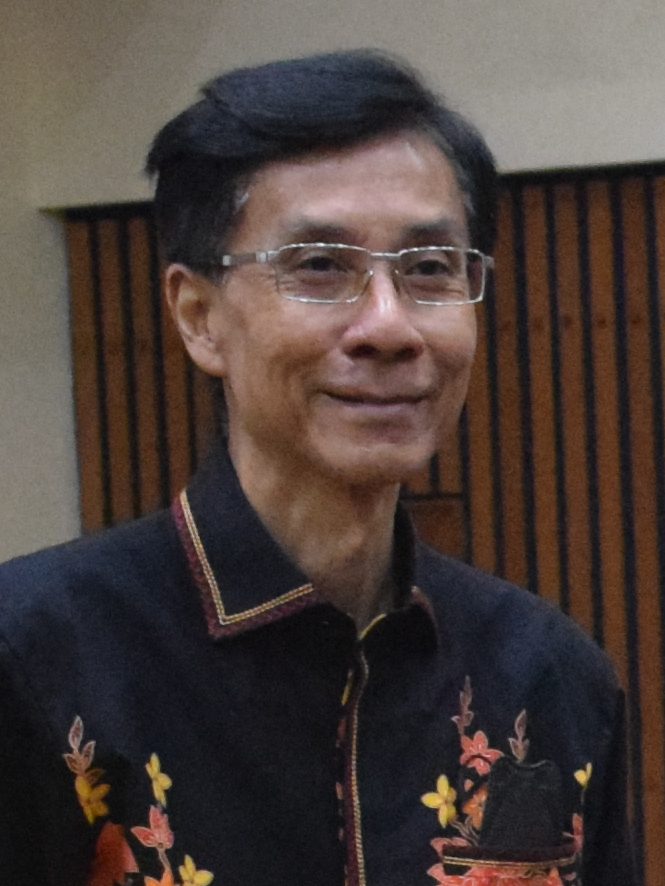

Dean of the Faculty of Social and Political Sciences of the University of Indonesia
- In office 20 January 2013 – 20 January 2021
- Preceded by: Bambang Shergi Laksmono
- Succeeded by: Semiarto Aji Purwanto

Deputy Rector for Student Affairs and Alumni Relations
- In office 11 October 2002 – 2005
- Preceded by: Umar Mansur
- Succeeded by: office abolished (himself as Director for Student Affairs and Alumni Relations)

Personal details
- Born: January 5, 1962 Magelang, Central Java, Indonesia
- Spouse: Natalia Wulandari
- Children: 2
- Parents: Soesilo (father); Djacroniah (mother)
- Relatives: Hendri Dwi Saptioratri Budiono (brother)
- Education: University of Indonesia (S.Sos., Dr.); Purdue University (MA)

Academic background
- Thesis: Network of Retired Military (TNI) Personnels in Politics: Study with the Approach of Actor Network Theory Pertaining to Retired Military (TNI) Personnels Entering into Politics in a Frame of Civil-Military Relations after TNI Reformation (2013)
- Doctoral advisor: Iwan Gardono Sudjatmiko; Sudarsono Hardjosoekarto

Academic work
- Discipline: Sociology
- Sub-discipline: Military sociology

Arie Setiabudi Soesilo (born 5 January 1962) is an Indonesian sociologist and academic administrator at the University of Indonesia (UI). He served as the university's deputy rector for student affairs from 2002 to 2005 and as the dean of the social and political sciences faculty from 2013 to 2021.

== Early life and education ==
Arie was born on 5 January 1962 in Magelang as the youngest child of Soesilo, a retired lieutenant colonel of the Indonesian Army, and Djacroniah. His brother, Hendri Dwi Saptioratri Budiono, was the dean of the university's faculty of engineering from 2018 to 2022. Upon graduating from high school in 1980, Arie began studying sociology at UI. He graduated from the university with a bachelor's degree in social sciences in 1988. He then pursued further studies on the subject at the Purdue University and graduated in 1991.

Arie began his doctorate studies in sociology at UI in 2009, where he conducted research on military sociology. His doctorate advisors were Iwan Gardono Sudjatmiko as the main advisor and former department of home affairs official Sudarsono Hardjosoekarto. His thesis, titled Network of Retired Military (TNI) Personnels in Politics: Study with the Approach of Actor Network Theory Pertaining to Retired Military (TNI) Personnels Entering into Politics in a Frame of Civil-Military Relations after TNI Reformation, was defended on 3 July 2013. He received his doctorate with a near-perfect GPA of 3.98.

== Academic career ==
=== Faculty positions ===
Arie began teaching sociology at his almamater shortly upon receiving his master's degree. From 1992 to 1998, Arie became the student academic advisor coordinator in the sociology department, serving under department chair Kamanto Sunarto. After Kamanto was elected as the faculty's dean in 1998, Arie became his deputy for student affairs. He continued to serve in the position after Kamanto was replaced by public administration professor Martani Huseini in 2001. During his tenure as dean, Arie was entrusted to supervise the National Student Science Week (PIMNAS, Pekan Ilmiah Mahasiswa Nasional) held at UI in 2000.

=== Deputy rector and director ===
In the 2002 University of Indonesia rector election, Martani competed against acting rector Usman Chatib Warsa, where he lost the election by a one-vote margin. Despite this, Arie became Usman's deputy for student affairs and alumni relations on 11 October 2002, where he was responsible for supervising the university's student executive council and other student organizations. As deputy rector, Arie was responsible for handling the deaths of five members of the university's student executive council at the Cikuya beach in Serang, Banten, in 2003. Arie supported the implementation of student orientation with strict rules and regulations and advocated to distance the orientation program from harmful practices. In light of the 2004 Indonesian legislative election, UI became one of the few universities that allowed political campaigns to be held onsite. Arie stated that the onsite campaigns involve limited meetings between students and the representatives of political parties.

In 2005, Usman announced the reorganization of the university's governing system, which reduced the amount of deputy rectors from five to two: academic and non-academic. As a result, Arie's deputy rector post was abolished; he was demoted to director of student and alumni affairs, subordinate to the deputy rector for academic affairs. Prior to this, Arie had already announced his resignation from the position in October 2004. Early into his tenure as director, in September 2005 Arie faced protests from students regarding the admission fee hike on freshmen.

After the end of his five-year term, Usman was replaced as rector by Arie's junior Gumilar Rusliwa Somantri in 2007. Gumilar undertook further reorganization of the directorates inside the university, including splitting the directorate of student affairs and alumni relations into two. Arie became the director for alumni relations, while former student executive council chairman Kamaruddin became the director for student affairs. Arie and several other UI officials was installed on 25 October 2007. As alumni director, Arie held homecoming day to gather UI alumni in the campus and coordinated efforts for alumni to provide scholarships for low-income students.

=== Dean of the Faculty of Social and Political Sciences ===
On 20 December 2013, Arie was installed as the dean of UI faculty of social and political sciences after undergoing a selection process in October that year. Shortly after his selection, Arie stated that the faculty somewhat behind in academic standards, particularly in accreditation and financial systems, and that more work is needed to improve management, enhance productivity, and maintain transparency. He was installed for a second term on 20 February 2017 after becoming the sole candidate for the position.

Early into his first term, in January 2014 the C building of the faculty, which housed the university's sociological research center, was burned down. The fire resulted in the loss of important sociological research documents and archives dating back to the 1950s, including 3,000 sociology books belonging to Iwan Gardono Sujatmiko. Arie stated the faculty would use their experts from the university's civil engineering department to assess the damage and determine whether the building needs to be demolished or can be renovated.

== Personal life ==
Arie is married to Natalia Wulandari and has two children.
