= Abdullah Quilliam =

Founder of England's first Mosque

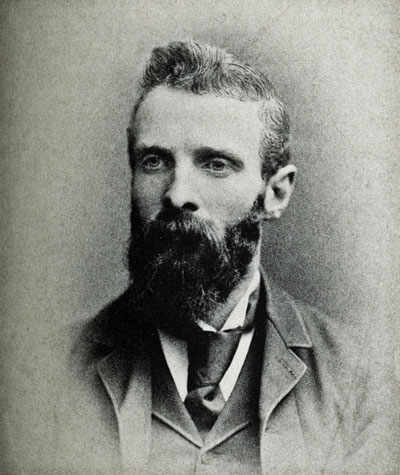
- Born: 10 April 1856; Liverpool, England
- Died: 23 April 1932 (aged 76); Bloomsbury, London, England
- Other names: عبد الله كويليام; William Henry Quilliam; Henri Marcel Leon; Haroun Mustapha Leon
- Title: Shaykh al-Islām of the British Isles

William Henry Quilliam (10 April 1856 – 23 April 1932), who changed his name to Abdullah Quilliam and later Henri Marcel Leon or Haroun Mustapha Leon, was a 19th-century British convert from Christianity to Islam, noted for founding England's first mosque and Islamic centre, and Britain's oldest Muslim organization, the Association of British Muslims.

== Early life ==
William Henry Quilliam was born at 22 Eliot Street, Liverpool, on 10 April 1856, to a wealthy local family. He spent most of his childhood on the Isle of Man and was brought up as a Methodist. He was educated at the Liverpool Institute and the Manx King William's College.

He became a solicitor in 1878, specialising in criminal law, and practising at 28 Church Street, Liverpool. He defended suspects in many high-profile murder cases. In 1879, he married Hannah Johnstone. At this time, Quilliam was a Wesleyan Methodist and a proponent of the temperance movement.

== Conversion to Islam ==
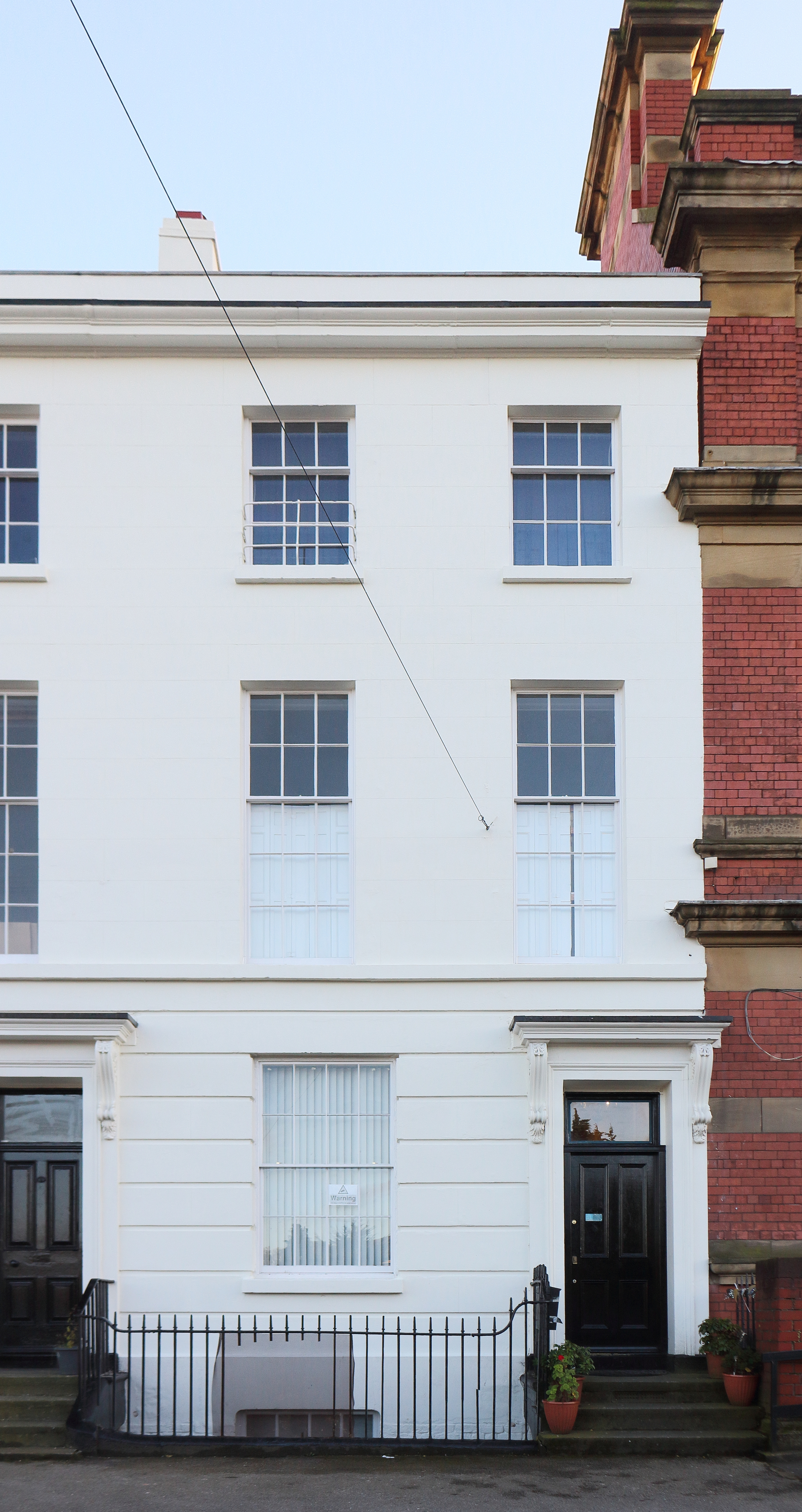
8 Brougham Terrace, home of the Liverpool Muslim Institute

Quilliam converted to Islam in 1887 after visiting Morocco to recover from an illness. Quilliam purchased numbers 8, 11 and 12 Brougham Terrace, Liverpool, following his conversion, thanks to a donation from Nasrullah Khan, Crown Prince of the Emirate of Afghanistan. 8 Brougham Terrace became the Liverpool Muslim Institute, the first functioning mosque in Britain; it opened on Christmas Day, 1889. Quilliam also opened a boarding school for boys and a day school for girls, as well as an orphanage, Medina House, for non-Muslim parents who were unable to look after their children and agreed for them to be brought up as Muslims. In addition, the Institute hosted educational classes covering a wide range of subjects, and included a museum and science laboratory. In 1889, he first published The Faith of Islam, which focused on dawah to Islam and its key principles. Initially, 2,000 copies were published, and a further 3,000 were produced in 1890. Quilliam also published The Crescent, a weekly account of Muslims in Britain, and Islamic World, a monthly publication with a worldwide audience.

In 1890, Quilliam orchestrated protests against the showing of Hall Caine's play, Mahomet. The first public Muslim burial in Liverpool was of Michael Hall, a former Methodist preacher who had converted to Islam, in 1891.

A number of notables converted to Islam as a result of Quilliam's preaching. They included professors Nasrullah Warren and Haschem Wilde, as well as Robert Stanley, JP and former mayor of Stalybridge. It is estimated that around 600 people converted to Islam in Britain as a direct result of Quilliam's work.

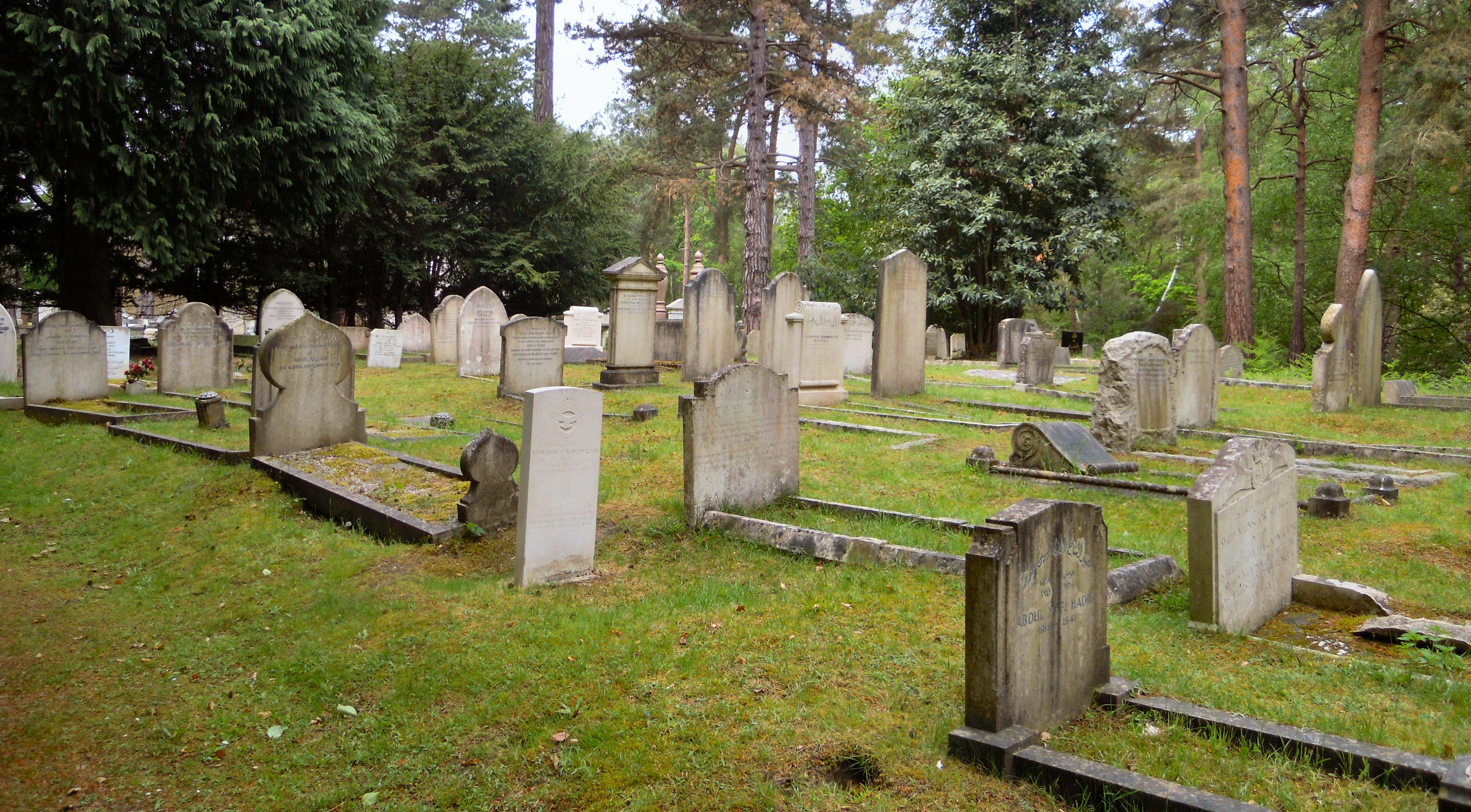
Quilliam's unmarked grave is in this small area of the Muslim Section of Brookwood Cemetery

He travelled extensively and received many honours from the leaders of the Islamic world. Abdul Hamid II, the 26th Caliph of the Ottoman Empire, granted Quilliam the title of Shaykh al-Islām for the British Isles. The Emir of Afghanistan recognised him as the Sheikh of Muslims in Britain, and he was appointed as the vice consul in Liverpool by the emperor of Qajar Iran. He had contact with English-speaking West African Muslims and toured the region's coastal cities on his way to Lagos to attend the consecration of the Shitta-Bey Mosque in 1894.

Quilliam's work in Liverpool ended when he fled to Turkey in 1908, ahead of being struck off the Roll of Solicitors for unprofessional conduct, including fabricating details to make a divorce legally enforceable. The Muslim community, which believed in khul' (contractual divorce), felt Quilliam's conduct was not offensive. Regardless, in his absence, his son swiftly disposed of the property that had been used as a mosque and Islamic centre. Without Quilliam's influence and funding, the Muslim community in Liverpool dispersed.

He returned to England around 1910 and legally married his second wife, legitimizing their children. Going by the name 'Henri Mustapha de Léon', he founded a magazine, The Philomath, in 1913, then another, The Physiologist, which ran concurrently beginning in 1917. The Muslim community seems to have been aware of his former identity, and he frequently spoke at meetings of his British Muslim Society. He spent most of his twilight years at Onchan on the Isle of Man, where unlikely rumours of keeping a harem swirled around him.

He died in Taviton Street, Bloomsbury, London in 1932, and was buried in an unmarked grave at Brookwood Cemetery near Woking. Prominent Anglo-Muslims Abdullah Yusuf Ali and Marmaduke Pickthall (both of whom translated the Qur'an), along with Rowland Allanson-Winn, 5th Baron Headley, were later buried near him in the M1 Muslim Section of the cemetery.

== Political views ==
Quilliam argued that Muslims should not "take up arms" against other Muslims on the behalf of non-Muslims. During the war in Sudan, Quilliam published a pamphlet stating that any British Muslim that decided to aid in some manner the expedition was acting in "contrary to the Shariat". His political views and allegiance to the Ottoman Caliph led some to denounce him as a traitor.

== Legacy ==
His legacy is principally maintained by the Abdullah Quilliam Society, which was founded in 1996. The society aims to complete the restoration of the Liverpool Muslim Institute on Brougham Terrace. The society has been assisted by academics including Ron Geaves, formerly of Liverpool Hope University, and Mehmet Seker of Dokuz Eylül University. The society also offers university student accommodation.

Quilliam, originally The Quilliam Foundation, a think tank aimed at challenging extremist Islamist ideologies, launched in 2008, was named after him.

== See also ==
- Alexander Russell Webb, early prominent Anglo-American Muslim convert
- Islam in the United Kingdom

== Sources ==
- Lewis, Philip (1994). Islamic Britain: Religion, Politics, and Identity among British Muslims: Bradford in the 1990s. London: I.B. Tauris. ISBN 1-85043-861-7.
- Singleton, Brent D. (2009). The Convert's Passion: An Anthology of Islamic Poetry from Late Victorian and Edwardian Britain. Rockville, MD: Wildside. ISBN 978-1-4344-0354-4. (Includes poems by Quilliam and others)
