= Liverpool Muslim Institute =

Former mosque in Liverpool

Coordinates: 53.414°N 2.960°W

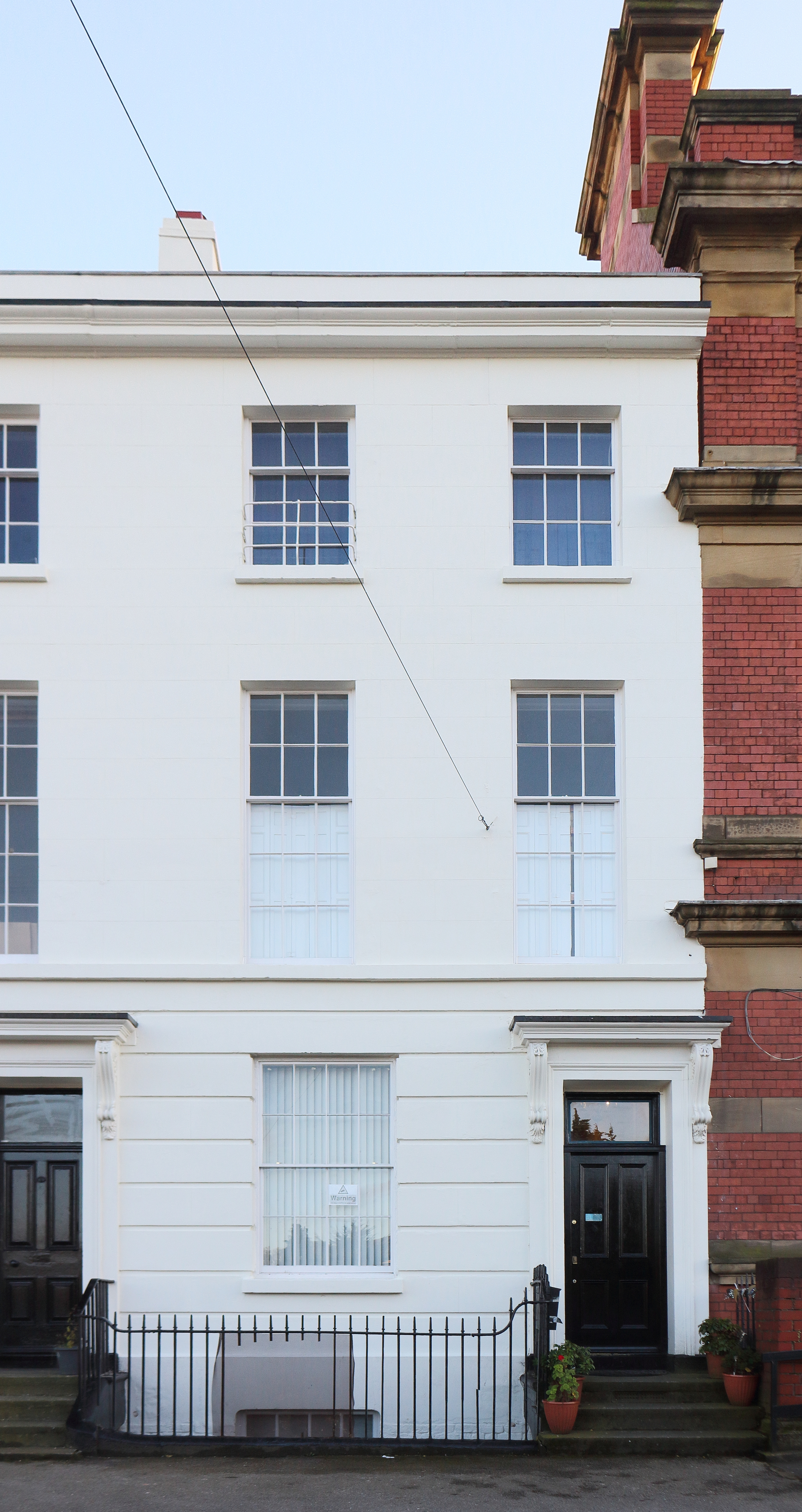
8, Brougham Terrace in 2019

The Liverpool Muslim Institute is a mosque located on 8 Brougham Terrace in Liverpool, England. Originally founded in Liverpool by Abdullah Quilliam, an English convert to Islam in 1887, making it probably the first recorded mosque in England. It closed in 1908.

The site was leased in 2005/6 by the Abdullah Quilliam Society, which restored the buildings and reopened the mosque in 2014, acquiring the freehold of the buildings in 2018.

== History ==
=== Building ===
Brougham Terrace was constructed around 1830, and named after the whig politician Henry Brougham, 1st Baron Brougham and Vaux. It is built in brick, partly stuccoed, with stone dressings, and a slate roof. The terrace has three storeys, and is in six bays. The windows are sashes. At the top is a shallow parapet.

=== Establishment of the institute ===
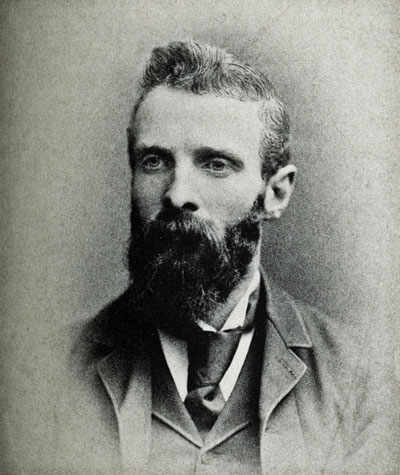
Abdullah Quilliam

William Henry Quilliam was born in Liverpool in 1856. He developed an interest in Islam when travelling in Morocco. In 1887 he converted to the religion, taking the name Abdullah Quilliam and founding the Liverpool Muslim Institute with his first convert, Mrs Elizabeth Cates, initially at the Temperance Hall on Mount Vernon Street, Liverpool.

In 1889 Quilliam bought 8, Brougham Terrace, on West Derby Road, where he constructed an extension on the rear to serve as a mosque. The Liverpool Mosque and Muslim Institute was officially established in 1891. This was probably the first recorded mosque in the United Kingdom (a claim that an earlier mosque opened in Cardiff in 1860 has been shown to result from a transcription error).

By 1893 they started publishing The Crescent on a weekly basis, to be supplemented by The Islamic World, which appeared on a monthly basis. They developed their own print shop in the basement of the building and soon attracted an international readership from across 20 countries.

Maulavi Barkatullah worked at the institute from 1895 to 1899. Barrister Abdul Kadir Khan, son of Haji Munir Khan, was a trusted companion of Abdullah Quilliam; he taught Arabic, Urdu and Persian with professors Nasrullah Warren and Haschem Wilde at Liverpool Muslim Institute. Robert Stanley served as the vice president of mosque.

By the turn of the century they numbered 150, mostly English people. They were able to purchase the rest of Brougham Terrace, and soon organised a school. They also developed a library, a reading room, museum and science laboratory, providing evening classes for Muslim and non-Muslim alike.

=== Closure ===
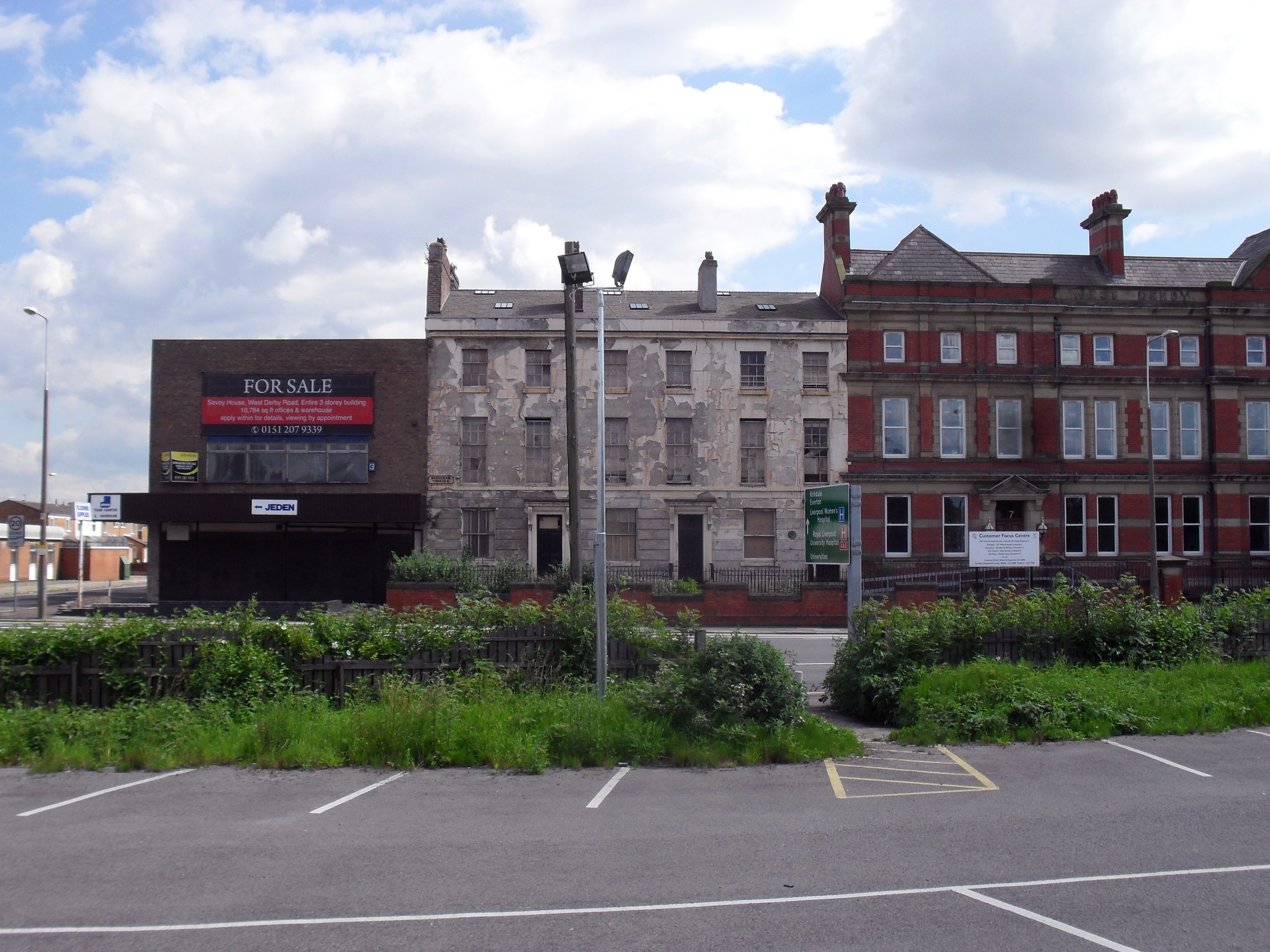
Brougham Terrace in 2007

Quilliam left Liverpool in 1908 in advance of being struck off as a solicitor and his son sold the property to Liverpool Corporation.

8-10 Brougham Terrace became home to the Liverpool Register Office. The mosque extension was converted for use of a strong room, with most of its original features being lost. The room was referred to by register office workers as "the little mosque", though the reason for this name had been forgotten. Numbers 11 and 12 Brougham Terrace were demolished between 1908 and 1927 to build a cinema, leaving 8-10 as the only survivors of the terrace.

The registry office closed in 2000, after which the buildings were disused and suffered from vandalism.

=== Restoration and reopening ===
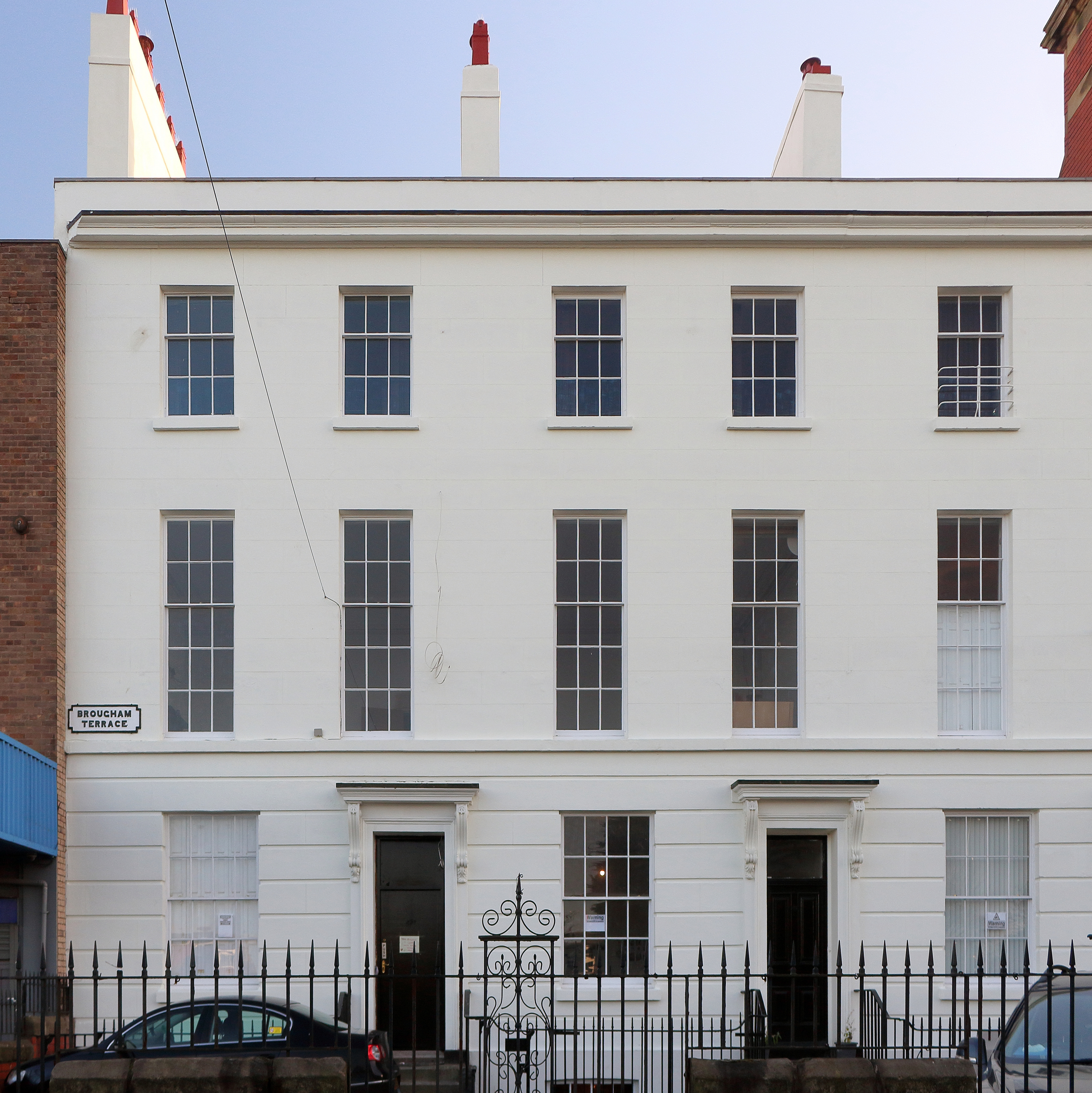
9 and 10 Brougham Terrace in 2019

The Abdullah Quilliam Society was formed in 1999, aiming to raise funds to restore 8–10, Brougham Terrace, re-open the historic mosque and establish an educational centre. It signed a two-year lease on the premises in 2005/6 and started restoration work. The mosque re-opened in 2014, and the charity gained the freehold of the property from Liverpool City Council in 2018.

8, Brougham Terrace, West Derby Road was upgraded to a Grade II* listed building in 2018. Numbers 9 and 10 are also listed, at Grade II.
