= Violence in the Quran =

Conflict in Islam's principal scripture

The Quran contains verses exhorting violence against enemies and others urging restraint and conciliation. Because some verses abrogate others, and because some are thought to be general commands while others refer to specific enemies, how the verses are understood and how they relate to each other "has been a central issue in Islamic thinking on war" according to scholars such as Charles Matthews.

While numerous scholars explain Quranic phrases on violence to be only in the context of a defensive response to oppression; militant groups (such as al-Qaeda and Islamic State) have frequently cited these verses to justify their violent actions. The Quran's teachings on violence remain a topic of vigorous debate.

== Abrogation ==
Charles Matthews writes that there is a "large debate about what the Quran commands in regards to the "sword verses" and the "peace verses". According to Matthews, "the question of the proper prioritization of these verses, and how they should be understood in relation to one another, has been a central issue for Islamic thinking about war."

Prior to the Hijra travel, Muhammad struggled non-violently against his oppressors in Mecca. It wasn't until after the exile that the Quranic revelations began to adopt a more offensive perspective.

According to Oliver Leaman, a number of Islamic jurists asserted the primacy of the "sword verses" over the conciliatory verses in specific historical circumstances. For example, according to Diane Morgan, Ibn Kathir (1301–1372) asserted that the Sword Verse abrogated all peace treaties that had been promulgated between Muhammad and idolaters.

Modernists reject the abrogating status of the sword verses, which would result in the abrogation (naskh) of numerous Quranic verses that counsel peace and reconciliation.

== Peace and conciliation ==
Numerous scholars and authors, both Muslim and non-Muslim have testified to the underlying rejection of violence, cruelty, coercion, and intolerance of the Quran and its embrace of justice and self-defence. According to Fawzy Abdelmalek, "many Muslim scholars speak of Islam as a religion of peace and not of violence. They say that the non-Muslims misunderstand the Quran verses about Jihad and the conduct of war in Islam."

Nissim Rejwan asserts that "violence and cruelty are not in the spirit of the Quran, nor are they found in the life of the Prophet, nor in the lives of saintly Muslims."

According to Feisal Abdul Rauf, "the Quran expressly and unambiguously prohibits the use of coercion in faith because coercion would violate a fundamental human right— the right to a free conscience. A different belief system is not deemed a legitimate cause for violence or war under Islamic law. The Quran Al-Baqara 256 is categorical on this: "There shall be no compulsion in religion" (Q2:256); "Say to the disbelievers [that is, atheists, or polytheists, namely those who reject God] "To you, your beliefs, to me, mine" (Q109:1–6)"

Charles Matthews characterizes the peace verses as saying that, "if others want peace, you can accept them as peaceful even if they are not Muslim." As an example, Matthews cites the second sura which commands believers not to transgress limits in warfare: "fight in God's cause against those who fight you, but do not transgress limits [in aggression]; God does not love transgressors" (Q2:190).

Chiba and Schoenbaum argue that Islam "does not allow Muslims to fight against those who disagree with them regardless of belief system", but instead "urges its followers to treat such people kindly". Yohanan Friedmann has argued that the Quran does not promote fighting for the purposes of religious coercion, although the war as described is "religious" in the sense that the enemies of the Muslims are described as "enemies of God" (Q8:57–62).

Solomon A. Nigosian has argued that in "duty to halt aggression or to strive for the preservation of Islamic principles", fighting may be involved, where the Quran encourages them to "fight courageously and steadfastly against recalcitrant states, be they Muslim or non-Muslim." He also argues that the "Quranic statement is clear" on the issue of fighting in defence of Islam as "a duty that is to be carried out at all costs", where "God grants security to those Muslims who fight in order to halt or repel aggression".

According to Chandra Muzaffar, "The Quranic exposition on resisting aggression, oppression and injustice lays down the parameters within which fighting or the use of violence is legitimate. What this means is that one can use the Quran as the criterion for when violence is legitimate and when it is not."

In the Islamic telling of Cain and Abel, Abel tells his murderous brother that "If thou dost stretch thy hand against me to slay me, it is not for me to stretch my hand against thee to slay thee: for I do fear Allah". Some scholars, such as Jawdat Said, have identified this as an example of pacifism.

Various Ahmadis scholars like Muhammad Ali, Maulana Sadr-ud-Din, Basharat Ahmad and also the British orientalist Gottlieb Wilhelm Leitner argue that when the Quran's verses are read in context, it clearly appears that the Quran prohibits initial aggression, and allows fighting only in self-defense.

Arvind Kumar writes:

The Quran sanctions violence to counter violence. If one studies the history of Arab tribes before Islam and fierce fighting they indulged in one would be convinced that the philosophy of passive resistance would not have worked in that environment.

According to Khaled Abou El Fadl, "there is not a single verse in the Quran that calls for an unmitigated, unqualified, or unreserved obligation to fight the unbelievers." According to Esposito and Mogahed, the Quran balances permission to fight the enemy with a strong mandate for making peace.

== Verses on conflict ==
Quran 2:191 has caused some debate, namely on two points. The first is that the killing of others is authorized in the event of "persecution;" (Note: Muhsin Khan translates: And fight in the Way of Allah those who fight you, but transgress not the limits. Truly, Allah likes not the transgressors. [This Verse is the first one that was revealed in connection with Jihad, but it was supplemented by another (Q9:36)]. And kill them wherever you find them, and turn them out from where they have turned you out. And Al-Fitnah is worse than killing. And fight not with them at Al-Masjid-al-Haram (the sanctuary at Makkah), unless they (first) fight you there. But if they attack you, then kill them. Such is the recompense of the disbelievers. Fight them until there is no [more] fitnah and [until] worship is [acknowledged to be] for Allah. But if they cease, then there is to be no aggression except against the oppressors. — 190) the second is that fighting may persist until "religion is for Allah" and there is no more "fitnah" (fitnah having many possible interpretations, the most likely being "trial" or "testing"). Quran 2:191–193

Quran scholars claim that the textual context of this particular passage is defensive war after the Treaty of Hudaybiyyah was broken by the Qurayshi-affiliated Banu Bakr tribe when they attacked the Muslim-allied tribe of Banu Khaza'a. In response, the Prophet sent a letter requesting the Quraysh to either terminate their alliance with Banu Bakr or pay a ransom. The Quraysh rejected both of Mohammad's offers, thus, breaking the treaty. It is also agreed upon that the verse refers to only the ones who broke the treaty.

The previous verse says:

Fight in the cause of Allah those who fight you, but do not transgress limits; for Allah loveth not transgressors.

— Quran 2:190

This has been used to argue that fighting is only permissible as a form of defence.

Micheline R. Ishay has argued that "the Quran justifies wars for self-defense to protect Islamic communities against internal or external aggression by non-Islamic populations, and wars waged against those who 'violate their oaths' by breaking a treaty". Mufti M. Mukarram Ahmed has also argued that the Quran encourages people to fight in self-defence. He has also argued that the Quran has been used to direct Muslims to make all possible preparations to defend themselves against enemies.

=== Sword Verses ===
There are two principal verses in the Quran (9:5 and 9:29) that are called "sword verses" though the word 'sword' does not occur in the Quran. Quran 9:5, in particular, from Surah At-Tawba is known as the Sword Verse or Verse of the Sword (Ayat al-sayf).

But when the forbidden months are past, then fight and slay the Pagans wherever ye find them, an seize them, beleaguer them, and lie in wait for them in every stratagem (of war); but if they repent, and establish regular prayers and practise regular charity, then open the way for them: for Allah is Oft-forgiving, Most Merciful.

— Surah At-Tawbah 9:5 ^{-Yusuf Ali}

Reuven Firestone says that Ibn Kathir held that four of the "sword verses" refer specifically to "four types of people against whom the Muslims are obligated to fight: 9:5 refers to fighting the idolaters; 9:29 refers to fighting the Scriptuaries until they pay the poll tax; 9:73 refers to fighting those who outwardly appear as Muslims but who actually oppose Muhammad and the community of Islam, and 49:9 refers to fighting Muslims who unjustly oppress other Muslims."

Patricia Crone states that the famous Verse of the Sword is directed against a particular group accused of oath-breaking and aggression, and exempts those polytheists who remained faithful. Crone states that this verse seems to be based on the rules mentioned above. Here also it is stressed that one must stop when they do. Oliver Leaman says that Quran 60:8 implies that "non-Muslims of good will and pacific nature cannot be the targets of war simply on account of their different religious background".

== Peace verses ==
Khaled Abou El Fadl notes several verses that can be interpreted in support of tolerance and diversity – a precondition for peaceful coexistence. Quran 49:13, 11:118–9, 5:48 indicate an expectation and acceptance of diversity among human beings: that diversity is part of "divine intent":

O mankind! Lo! We have created you male and female, and have made you nations and tribes that ye may know one another. Lo! the noblest of you, in the sight of Allah, is the best in conduct. Lo! Allah is Knower, Aware.

— Quran 49:13

And if thy Lord had willed, He verily would have made mankind one nation, yet they cease not differing, ...Save him on whom thy Lord hath mercy; and for that He did create them. ...

— Quran 11:118-119

And unto thee have We revealed the Scripture with the truth, confirming whatever Scripture was before it, and a watcher over it. So judge between them by that which Allah hath revealed, and follow not their desires away from the truth which hath come unto thee. For each We have appointed a divine law and a traced-out way. Had Allah willed He could have made you one community. But that He may try you by that which He hath given you (He hath made you as ye are). So vie one with another in good works. Unto Allah ye will all return, and He will then inform you of that wherein ye differ.

— Quran 5:48

Lo! those who believe, and those who are Jews, and Sabaeans, and Christians – Whosoever believeth in Allah and the Last Day and doeth right – there shall no fear come upon them neither shall they grieve.

— Quran 5:69

Abou El Fadl also notes verses giving a "mandate in favor of peace" and commanding Muslims not to "turn away unbelievers who seek to make peace".

And if they incline to peace, incline thou also to it, and trust in Allah. Lo! He, even He, is the Hearer, the Knower. Quran 8:61 ^{-Yusuf Ali}

== See also ==
- War in Islam
- The Bible and violence
- Criticism of the Quran
- Dar al-Harb
- Islam and violence
- List of wars and battles in pre-Islamic Arabia
- Pacifism in Islam
- Peace in Islamic philosophy
- Religion and peacebuilding
- Religious violence
- Quranic literalism
- Quranic inerrancy
