= Naskh =

Naskh may refer to:

- Naskh (script), a type of script for the Arabic language
- Naskh (tafsir), an exegetical theory in Islamic law
