= Sword Verse =

Named verse of the Quran

The Sword Verse (Arabic: آية السيف, romanized: ayat as-sayf) is the fifth verse of the ninth surah (at-Tawbah) of the Quran (also written as 9:5). It is a Quranic verse widely cited by critics of Islam to suggest the faith promotes violence against pagans (polytheists, mushrikun) by isolating the portion of the verse "kill the polytheists wherever you find them, capture them".

[9:5] But once the Sacred Months have passed, kill the polytheists wherever you find them, capture them, besiege them, and lie in wait for them on every way. But if they repent, perform prayers, and pay alms-tax, then set them free. Indeed, Allah is All-Forgiving, Most Merciful.^{[Quran 9:5]}

The next verse, often excluded from quotes, appears to present a conditional reprieve:

[9:6] And if anyone from the polytheists asks for your protection ˹O Prophet˺, grant it to them so they may hear the Word of Allah, then escort them to a place of safety, for they are a people who have no knowledge.^{[Quran 9:6]}

Allah does not forbid you from those who do not fight you because of religion and do not expel you from your homes - from being righteous toward them and acting justly toward them. Indeed, Allah loves those who act justly. Quran 60:8

Quranic exegetes al-Baydawi and al-Alusi explain that it refers to those pagan Arabs who violated their peace treaties by waging war against Muslims.Islamic rulers took Jizya, a tax from defeated territory to support them. Many rulers avoided islamic conversions because it reduced Jizya.

== Text and translations ==
=== Verse 9:5 ===
Arabic	Transliteration	Abdullah Yusuf Ali, The Holy Qur'an (1934)	Muhammad Abdel-Haleem, The Qur'an (2004)	Mustafa Khattab, The Clear Quran (2015)
فَإِذَا انْسَلَخَ الْأَشْهُرُ الْحُرُمُ فَاقْتُلُوا الْمُشْرِكِينَ حَيْثُ وَجَدْتُمُوهُمْ وَخُذُوهُمْ وَاحْصُرُوهُمْ وَاقْعُدُوا لَهُمْ كُلَّ مَرْصَدٍ فَإِنْ تَابُوا وَأَقَامُوا الصَّلَاةَ وَآتَوُا الزَّكَاةَ فَخَلُّوا سَبِيلَهُمْ إِنَّ اللَّهَ غَفُورٌ رَحِيمٌ	fa-idhā insalakha l-ashhuru l-ḥurumu fa-uq'tulū l-mush'rikīna ḥaythu wajadttumūhum wakhudhūhum wa-uḥ'ṣurūhum wa-uq'ʿudū lahum kulla marṣadin fa-in tābū wa-aqāmū l-ṣalata waātawū l-zakata fakhallū sabīlahum inna llāha ghafūrun raḥīmun	"But when the forbidden months are past, then fight and slay the Pagans wherever ye find them, and seize them, beleaguer them, and lie in wait for them in every stratagem (of war); but if they repent, and establish regular prayers and practise regular charity, then open the way for them: for Allah is Oft-forgiving, Most Merciful."^{[Quran 9:5 -Yusuf Ali]}	"When the [four] forbidden months are over, wherever you encounter the idolaters, kill them, seize them, besiege them, wait for them at every lookout post; but if they turn [to God], maintain the prayer, and pay the prescribed alms, let them go on their way, for God is most forgiving and merciful."^{[Quran 9:5 -Abdul Haleem]}	"But once the Sacred Months have passed, kill the polytheists ˹who violated their treaties˺ wherever you find them, capture them, besiege them, and lie in wait for them on every way. But if they repent, perform prayers, and pay alms-tax, then set them free. Indeed, Allah is All-Forgiving, Most Merciful."^{[Quran 9:5 -The Clear Quran]}

=== Verse 9:1 - 9:7 ===
Giving context to verse 9:5 are the first seven verses of Surat at-Tawbah.

- 9:1 ˹This is˺ a discharge from all obligations, by Allah and His Messenger, to the polytheists you ˹believers˺ have entered into treaties with:
- 9:2 “You ˹polytheists˺ may travel freely through the land for four months, but know that you will have no escape from Allah, and that Allah will disgrace the disbelievers.”
- 9:3 A declaration from Allah and His Messenger ˹is made˺ to all people on the day of the greater pilgrimage that Allah and His Messenger are free of the polytheists. So if you ˹pagans˺ repent, it will be better for you. But if you turn away, then know that you will have no escape from Allah. And give good news ˹O Prophet˺ to the disbelievers of a painful punishment.
- 9:4 As for the polytheists who have honoured every term of their treaty with you and have not supported an enemy against you, honour your treaty with them until the end of its term. Surely Allah loves those who are mindful ˹of Him˺.
- 9:5 But once the Sacred Months have passed, kill the polytheists wherever you find them, capture them, besiege them, and lie in wait for them on every way. But if they repent, perform prayers, and pay alms-tax, then set them free. Indeed, Allah is All-Forgiving, Most Merciful.
- 9:6 And if anyone from the polytheists asks for your protection ˹O Prophet˺, grant it to them so they may hear the Word of Allah, then escort them to a place of safety, for they are a people who have no knowledge.
- 9:7 How can such polytheists have a treaty with Allah and His Messenger, except those you have made a treaty with at the Sacred Mosque? So, as long as they are true to you, be true to them. Indeed Allah loves those who are mindful ˹of Him˺.

— Surah At-Tawbah 9:1-7

== Interpretative tradition ==
Islamic scholars and jurists disagreed upon the generality of the application of the verse.

=== Specific ruling ===
==== Premodern Muslim scholars ====
According to several mainstream Islamic scholars, the verse relates to a specific event in Islamic history—namely that Arabian pagans made and broke a covenant with Arab Muslims. They cite the verses immediately preceding and following 9:5, 9:4 and 9:6, and emphasize: Only those pagans who broke the covenant were subject to violent repercussions so that any pagans who honored the covenant or repented their betrayal were to be spared. Commentating on the following verse, 9:6, Asma Afsaruddin brings the position of some early commentators, and the overall direction taken is that it concerns the Arab polytheists and doesn't translate into indiscriminate killing:

Mujāhid said that this verse guarantees the safety of people in general (insān) who came to listen to the Prophet recite from the Qurān until they had returned to the place of refuge whence they came.

The Tanwīr al-miqbās says that the verse commands the Prophet to grant safe conduct to anyone from among the polytheists who asks for it, so that he may hear the recitation of the speech of God. If he does not believe (sc. embrace Islam), then he is to be granted safe passage back to his land (waṭanahu). This is so because they are people ignorant of the commandments of God and His oneness.

Hūd b. Muḥakkam similarly comments that the polytheist who requests safe conduct from Muslims in order to listen to the word of God is to be so granted and returned unharmed to his place of origin, whether he embraces Islam or not. This was the view of Mujāhid, for example. Al-Kalbî quoted as saying that the verse referred instead to a group of polytheists who wished to renew their pact with Muḥammad after the sacred months had passed. When Muḥammad asked them to profess Islam, offer prayers, and pay the zakāt, they refused, and the Prophet let them return safely to their homes. Ibn Muḥakkam further notes that al-Ḥasan al-Basrī had remarked thus on the status of this verse: “It is valid and unabrogated (muḥkama) until the Day of Judgment.”

Al-Qummî affirms briefly that this verse asks Muslims to recite the Qurān to the polytheist, explain it to him, and not show him any opposition until he returns safely. It is worth noting that Furāt regards Qurān 9:6 as abrogating Qurān 9:5 and thus overriding the seemingly blanket injunction concerning the polytheists contained in the latter verse. In this he agrees with many of his predecessors that the polytheist who wishes for safe conduct in order to listen to the word of God should be so granted and then peacefully escorted back to his home, regardless of whether he had embraced Islam or not.

Al-Ṭabarî says that in this verse God counsels Muḥammad, “If someone from among the polytheists (al-mushrikīn)—those whom I have commanded that you fight and slay after the passage of the sacred months—were to ask you, O Muḥammad, for safe conduct in order to listen to the word of God, then grant this protection to him so that he may hear the word of God and you may recite it to him.” Such an individual, according to the verse, is to be subsequently escorted back to his place of safety even if he rejects Islam and fails to believe after the Prophet’s recitation of the Qurān before him. Scholars in the past who have agreed with this general interpretation include Ibn Isḥāq, al-Suddī, and Mujāhid (as above).

In the same breath, still on 9:6, bringing later scholars and Quranic commentators, she mentions that "in his similarly brief commentary, al-Zamakhsharî explains this verse quite literally—that if one of the polytheists, with whom no pact (mīthāq) exists, were to request safe conduct from the Muslims in order to listen to the Qurān, then he should be granted it so that he may reflect upon God’s words. Afterward, he is to be escorted back to his home where he feels safe. This, al-Zamakhsharî says, is established practice for all time." Concerning the influential Fakhr al-Din al-Razi, "unlike previous exegetes, al-Rāzī further comments that this verse indicates that imitation of precedent (al-taqlīd) is not sufficient in religion, and that critical inquiry (al-nazar) and the seeking of proofs (al-istidlāl) are indispensable requirements within religion.

Tafsir al-Kabir (Fakhr al-Din al-Rāzī, commentary on verses 9:5-6):

"Know that these verses indicate that blind imitation is not sufficient in matters of religion. There must be investigation and argumentation. This is so because, if blind imitation were sufficient, the non‐believer would not have been given respite. Rather, one would have said to him, “Believe or we kill you!” Since this is not what God ordered, and instead we gave him respite and removed the fear from him and since it is obligatory for us to take a non‐believer to his place of safety, we know that this is only because blind imitation in matters of religion is not sufficient. One must have proof and argument....if this is clear, we say that these verses do not indicate the period of the respite [in the case of the non‐believers seeking protection]. Perhaps this period can only be known by some customary practice [i.e., it is certainly not indicated in our Scripture]. So when there is some sign that the polytheist is trying to seek the truth in religion by way of argumentation, he is to be given respite and to be left alone. But if he appears to be turning away from the truth, buying time by lies, one is not to pay attention to that polytheist. God knows the truth!"

If emulation of precedent were enough, he argues, then this verse would not have granted a respite to this unbeliever, and he would have been merely given a choice between professing his belief [in Islam] or death. As this did not occur, it confirms that Muslims are required to offer safe conduct to such a person and thereby assuage his fears and allow him the opportunity to deliberate upon the proofs of religion.

==== Modern Muslim scholars ====
As per Muhammad Abdel-Haleem, translator of the Quran, while contextualizing 9:5 and bringing the wider sequential narrative:

It was these hardened polytheists in Arabia, who would accept nothing other than the expulsion of the Muslims or their reversion to paganism, and who repeatedly broke their treaties, that the Muslims were ordered to treat in the same way – to fight them or expel them. Even with such an enemy Muslims were not simply ordered to pounce on them and reciprocate by breaking the treaty themselves; instead, an ultimatum was issued, giving the enemy notice, that after the four sacred months mentioned in 9:5 above, the Muslims would wage war on them. The main clause of the sentence ‘kill the polytheists’ is singled out by some Western scholars to represent the Islamic attitude to war; even some Muslims take this view and allege that this verse abrogated other verses on war. This is pure fantasy, isolating and decontextualizing a small part of a sentence. The full picture is given in 9:1–15, which gives many reasons for the order to fight such polytheists. They continuously broke their agreements and aided others against the Muslims, they started hostilities against the Muslims, barred others from becoming Muslims, expelled Muslims from the Holy Mosque and even from their own homes. At least eight times the passage mentions their misdeeds against the Muslims. Consistent with restrictions on war elsewhere in the Quran, the immediate context of this ‘Sword Verse’ exempts such polytheists as do not break their agreements and who keep the peace with the Muslims (9:7). It orders that those enemies seeking safe-conduct should be protected and delivered to the place of safety they seek (9:6). The whole of this context to v.5, with all its restrictions, is ignored by those who simply isolate one part of a sentence to build their theory of war in Islam on what is termed ‘The Sword Verse’ even when the word ‘sword’ does not occur anywhere in the Quran.

Rejecting the idea of abrogation (naskh), the influential Islamic reformist scholar Muhammad Abduh "citing the views of al-Suyūṭī, ‘Abduh argues that in the specific historical situation with which the verse is concerned—with its references to the passage of the four sacred months and the pagan Meccans—other verses in the Qur’ān advocating forgiveness and nonviolence were not abrogated by it, but rather placed in temporary abeyance or suspension (laysa naskhan bal huwa min qism al-mansa’) in that specific historical circumstance." Another modern Quranic scholar, Muhammad Asad, also states that the permission to fight and kill was restricted to specific tribes already at war with the Muslims who had breached their peace agreements and attacked them first.

The founder of the Muslim Brotherhood, Hassan al-Banna, held the same views, that "the sword verse was directed only at polytheists and not at the People of the Book", as, in his words, it contradicted Qur'anic verses “which decree inviting to Islam with wisdom and good counsel and attribute to God the final adjudication of differences on the Day of Judgment.” Generally attached to the MB, at least informally, Yusuf al-Qaradawi too believes that 9:5 is contextual.

The late authoritative Syrian scholar, Mohamed Said Ramadan Al-Bouti, followed the same thinking, as he "comments that if Qurān 9:5 is understood to command the fighting of polytheists until their death or their acceptance of Islam, then such a command is countermanded by the very next verse that exhorts Muslims to offer refuge and safe conduct to polytheists while they are in their state of polytheism. He dismisses as irresponsibly arbitrary the view of those who suggest that Qurān 9:5 abrogates Qurān 9:6; this goes against the usual rule of abrogation that a later verse may supersede an earlier verse, and he stresses that their understanding of Qurān 9:5 contradicts other, more numerous verses of the Qurān that were later revelations and the praxis of the Companions."

==== Non-Muslim scholars ====
Patricia Crone states that the verse is directed against a particular group accused of oath-breaking and aggression and excepts those polytheists who remained faithful. Crone states that this verse seems to be based on the same above-mentioned rules. Here also it is stressed that one must cease fighting when the enemy does.

==== Modernists ====
Islamic modernists reject the abrogating status of the sword verses, which would result in the abrogation (naskh) of numerous Quranic verses that counsel peace and reconciliation.

==== Ahmadiyyah group ====
A similar interpretation of the verse as limited to defensive warfare is also found in Ahmadiyya literature, notably in Muhammad Ali's 1936 The Religion of Islam. In The English Commentary of the Holy Quran, which is a collective commentary supervised by the fourth caliph of the Ahmadis, Mirza Tahir Ahmad, and reuniting views of their second caliph, Mirza Basheer-ud-Din Mahmood Ahmad, as well as well-known Ahmadi scholars like Mirza Bashir Ahmad, Maulvi Sher Ali and Malik Ghulam Farid, concerning 9:5 we can read:

To wage war after the expiry of the four forbidden months did not apply to all idolaters without exception but was directed only against such avowed enemies of Islam as had themselves started hostilities against Islam and had broker their plighted word and plotted to expel de Holy Prophet from the city. The reason for this ultimate is given in the following few verses, viz. 9:8-13. As for those idolaters who had not been guilty of faithlessness and treachery, they were to be protected (see 9:4, 7). It is highly regrettable, however, that, divorcing this commandment from its context, some critics have made this verse the basis for an attack against Islam, alleging that it inculcates the destruction of all non-Muslims. The Quran and history belie that baseless allegation.

=== General ruling ===
On the contrary, there have been more general interpretations of 9:5-6 by some early and classical eminent Sunni authorities. Such as Al Shafi’i, the 8th century Sunni Madhab founder of the Salaf who notably extended the scope of 9:5 beyond the Polytheists and to Disbelievers in general, and then synthesised the verses 9:5-6 to derive the verdict that it is essentially permissible to take the life of an Adult Disbelieving man on the condition he was not promised an Oath of Protection by a Muslim.

Al shafi’i commented: Allah protected blood and restricted the taking of wealth, except for a lawful reason, by belief in Allah and in His Messenger or through a covenant given by the believers, based on the law of Allah and His Messenger, to the People of the Book. He allowed shedding the blood of Mature Men who abstain from belief and who do not possess a Covenant as Allah said: ...(9:5)

Similarly, Ibn Taymiyyah who is widely revered as “Shaykh al Islam” extended the scope of 9:5 to go beyond just Polytheists and interpreted it as an order for a universal jihad against all peoples.

When Allah revealed Surah bara’ah and commanded the Prophet to end the indefinite truces, he could no longer make truces as he used to do. Rather he was obligated to Wage Jihad against everyone, as Allah says in the verse..(9:5)

The 11th century Zahirite Ibn Hazm proposed a similar extension of scope from the verse’s context of revelation to “polytheists” in general, and made the judgement that this verse calls for the forced conversion of polytheists who are not Jews or Christians.

Ibn Hazm commented: “And the statements of Allah: ‘(9.5)’. And: (9.29)... are indicative of Allah the Exalted not acknowledging and nullifying every treaty, therefore leaving the polytheists no course but to accept Islam, or be fought. While the opportunity to pay the Jizyah in a state of humiliation, is specifically for the People of the Book

== See also ==
- Violence in the Quran
