= Naskh (tafsir) =

Islamic concept of legal abrogation

Naskh (نسخ) is an Arabic word usually translated as "abrogation". In tafsir, or Islamic legal exegesis, naskh recognizes that one rule might not always be suitable for every situation. In the widely recognized and "classic" form of naskh, one ḥukm "ruling" is abrogated to introduce an exception to the general rule, but the text the ḥukm is based on is not repealed.

Some examples of Islamic rulings based on naskh include a gradual ban on consumption of alcohol (originally alcohol was not banned, but Muslims were told that the bad outweighed the good in drinking) and a change in the direction of the qibla, the direction that should be faced when praying salat (originally Muslims faced Jerusalem, but this was changed to face the Kaaba in Mecca).

With few exceptions, Islamic revelations do not state which Quranic verses or hadith have been abrogated, and Muslim exegetes and jurists have disagreed over which and how many hadith and verses of the Quran are recognized as abrogated, with estimates varying from less than ten to over 500.

Other issues of disagreement include whether the Quran, the central religious text of Islam, can be abrogated by the Sunnah, the body of traditional social and legal custom and practice of the Islamic community, or vice versa – a disagreement in Sunni Islam between the Shafiʽi and Hanafi schools of fiqh; and whether verses of the Quran may be abrogated at all, instead of reinterpreted and more narrowly defined – an approach favored by a minority of scholars.

Several ayat (Quranic verses) state that some revelations have been abrogated and superseded by later revelations, and narrations from Muhammad's companions mention abrogated verses or rulings of the religion. The principle of abrogation of an older verse by a new verse in the Quran, or within the hadiths is an accepted principle of all four Sunni madhāhib, or schools of fiqh, and was an established principle in Sharia by at least the 9th century. Starting in the 19th century, modernist and Islamist scholars have argued against the concept of naskh, defending the absolute validity of the Quran.

An abrogated text or ruling is called mansūkh, and the text or ruling which abrogates it is called nāsikh.

== Definition and etymology ==
In the Arabic language, naskh (Arabic: نسخ) can be defined as abolition, abrogation, cancellation, invalidation, copying, or transcription, according to the Hans Wehr Dictionary of Modern Written Arabic.

As an Islamic term, there is a lack of agreement among scholars on what exactly al-Naskh is (according to several sources).

- According to Louay Fatoohi, "the term naskh never appears in the Qur'an in the meaning it acquired in Islamic law". A detailed examination of the two Quranic verses "seen by scholars as providing support to the principle of abrogation", shows that neither actually refers to "the concept of abrogation".
- Israr Ahmad Khan states that those who have read "the works of Abu Ubayd, al-Nahhas, Makki, Ibn al-Arabi, Ibn al-Jawzi, al-Zarkashi, al-Suyuti, and al-Dehlawi on the issue of abrogation will be confused regarding its definition".
- John Burton complains that the "greatest imaginable confusion reigns as to the definition of the term naskh", and that "an appalling degree of muddle" surrounds the meaning of verse Q.2:106 – "the Abrogation verse"; and that "the constant confusion of 'suppression' with 'supersession'" causes the reader "endless difficulty".
- Ahmad Ali Al-Imam states "most scholars ... differ on many points" of naskh, "particularly on its meaning, modes, and examples". (Note: See also Abdul-Rahim: "naskh remains a problematic theory, if not a difficult and divisive one", citing Zayd, Mustafa (1963). Al-Naskh fi al-Qur'an al-Karim, Cairo: Dar al-Fikr al-'Arabi, v.1, 4. but "when it concerns the technical conception of naskh, there is no disagreement among naskh scholars".)

Disputes over what defines naskh include

- whether the wording of the Quran can be abrogated while the ruling based on it is not (most scholars believe the ruling must be abrogated also),
- whether a verse in the Qur'an can abrogate a ruling in the Sunnah, and
- whether any Islamic revelation may be abrogated at all, or whether when God talks about replacing revelation (in "the abrogation verses" of the Qur'an: Q.2:106 and Q.16:101, see below) He is referring only to revelation which came before the Quran. (Note: Aslam Jayrajpan dismisses abrogation by saying "God's words are too lofty to be abrogated by human opinion", but this suggests the Torah and Gospel are not God's words.)

Another issue was how broadly naskh should be defined, with early Muslim scholars having (Note: This at least in part explains the wide difference in the estimates in the number of abrogated verses. "According to Shah Waliy Allah, the use of the term naskh in its general sense by the early generation highly enhanced the number of the repealed verses which reached five hundred. He thinks on this basis that the number of the repealed verses in the later ages was less than it was in the earlier time.") including things that later scholars did not consider naskh, such as:

1. exceptions to earlier verses,
1. particularization of the meaning of a verse (known as taksees, see below), and
2. clarifications of earlier verses. (Note: Abu Amina Elias agrees: "Confusion [over the definition of naskh/abrogation] occurs because the word 'abrogation' developed a technical meaning later on that was not the same as it was used by the earliest interpreters of the Quran. The righteous predecessors, such as Ibn Abbas and others, would use the term abrogation to mean a number of situations that did not involved the cancellation of previous verses." These situations included "the removal of the general, absolute, and outward meaning, whether by specification, restriction, interpreting an absolute as limited, or by explanation and clarification. Even they would refer to it as exceptional and conditional.")

Definitions of naskh given by Islamic scholars include:

- "abrogation, revocation, repeal. Theoretical tool used to resolve contradictions in Quranic verses, hadith literature, tafsir (Quranic exegesis), and usul al-fiqh (roots of law), whereby later verses (or reports or decisions) abrogate earlier ones" (Oxford Dictionary of Islam);
- an exegetical (explaining) theory of the repeal or abolition of a law for divine commands in the Quran and the Hadith, wherein the contradictory verses, within or between these Islamic scriptures, are analyzed (David S. Powers); through naskh, the superseding verse as well as the superseded verse(s) are determined for the purposes of formulating Sharia;
- "obliteration, cancellation, transfer, suppression, suspension" depending on the context, (Badshah, Naeem, et al.);
- suspension or replacement of one Sharia ruling by another with the conditions that the ruling that suspends/replaces is of a subsequent origin, and that the two rulings are enacted separately from one another, (Recep Dogan);
- removal of an Islamic command by a legally valid argument (raf al-hukm al-Shar'i bi dalil shar'i) (Al-Zurqani). (Note: Some other descriptions and definitions of naskh: Descriptions of Naskh by Sunni legal theorists of the tenth and eleventh centuries include: God's "replacing a ruling established by the lawgiver's address with another ruling"; "temporal indication of a ruling's duration".; John Burton cites three scholars of Quranic interpretation with three different definitions of abrogation supporting different definitions of abrogation: 1. Suddi: naskh means withdrawal (qabd).; 2. Ibn 'Abbas: it means 'replacement' (tabdil) (Q. 16: 101).; 3. Ibn abi Najih reports from the followers of Ibn Mas'uid: "We endorse (nuthbit, cf. Q. 13: 39) the wording, but replace (nubaddil, cf. Q. 16: 101) the ruling" (known as naskh al-hukm dūna al-tilāwa see below).; The phrase al-nāsikh wal-mansūkh (الناسخ والمنسوخ, "the abrogating and abrogated [verses]") is often used in study of Naskh; both nasikh and mansukh share the same root as naskh.)

== Scriptural basis ==
=== Quran ===
According to non-Muslim scholar of Islam John Burton, "no single verse" in the Quran "unequivocally points to the naskh of any other verse", (nor does any "irreproachable" hadith identify "any one verse as having either undergone or effected naskh"). Islamic Modernist mufti Muhammad Abduh (1849–1905) also stated "the Quran nowhere announced that verse so-and-so is naskh, or that verse such-and-such is mansukh."

Many of the verses believed to indicate the principle of naskh do not contain any form of the word naskh, i.e. any word with the triconsonantal root n-s-kh. Instead, they use "in place of" (baddal), "efface" (yamhua), "withdraw" (nadhhabanna لَنَذْهَبَنَّ), or "forget" (tansha تَنسَىٰٓ) which are all interpreted to refer to the process of naskh:

- Quran 16:101 ^{(Translated by Pickthall)}. "And when We put a revelation in place of (another) revelation, - and Allah knoweth best what He revealeth ..."
- Quran 13:39 ^{(Translated by Pickthall)}. "Allah effaceth what He will, and establisheth (what He will), and with Him is the source of ordinance."
- Quran 17:86 ^{(Translated by Pickthall)}. "... And if We willed We could withdraw that which We have revealed unto thee, then wouldst thou find no guardian for thee against Us in respect thereof. ...""
- Quran 87:6–7 ^{(Translated by Pickthall)}. "We shall make thee read (O Muhammad) so that thou shalt not forget, Save that which Allah willeth. Lo! He knoweth the disclosed and that which still is hidden.""

Of the four verses within the Qur'an that do contain some form of the word naskh — verses Q.7:154, Q.45:29, Q.22:52, and Q.2:106 — in two cases the word has nothing to do with abrogation of divine revelation, but is used in the context of texts and scribal activity:

- Quran 7:154 ^{(Translated by Yusuf Ali)}. "in the writing [nuskhah] thereon"—and
- Quran 45:29 ^{(Translated by Yusuf Ali)}. "For We were wont to put on Record [nastansikh] all that ye did"

The two verse that do involve abrogation are

- Quran 22:52, a verse allegedly referring to the Satanic Verse(s), (see below) and
- Quran 2:106, which is called a "Verse of abrogation".

==== Verses of abrogation ====
Q2:106 and Q16:101 are the two "verses of abrogation" contained in the Quran.

What We abrogate (of) a sign or [We] cause it to be forgotten, We bring better than it or similar (to) it. Do not you know that Allah over every thing (is) All-Powerful? (tr. Abdel Haleem)

— Qur'an 2:106,

When We substitute one revelation for (another) revelation, – and Allah knows best what He reveals (in stages),– they say, "Thou art but a forger": but most of them understand not.

— Qur'an 16:101,

They establish the principle in Islam that an older divine revelation may be abrogated and substituted with another one, a principle that has been historically accepted and applied by vast majority of Islamic jurists of both the Quran and the Sunnah.

Only Q.2:106 uses a form of the word naskh (specifically "nanskh" meaning "we abrogate"). Although there "are no less than a dozen" readings/interpretations of verse Q.2:106 (according to Khaleel Mohammed citing John Burton), the "majority of exegetes" (scholars of the interpretation of the Quran), (Note: known as mufassireen) find 2:106 indicative of two varieties of abrogation (see below):

- "supersession", i.e. the "suspension" and replacement of the old verse without its elimination (process known as naskh al-hukm duna al-tilawa, or ibdāl in Arabic)" or
- "suppression", i.e. the nullification/elimination of the old verse from the Mus'haf (the written Quran compiled after Muhammad's death) (process known as naskh al-hukm wa-'l-tilawa, or ibtāl in Arabic).

Two verse also suggest abrogation can refer to either these two meanings,

- 16:101. "We substitute one ayah for another""—suggests naskh is supersession/substitution (tabdīl, related to ibdāl).
- 22:52. "God eradicated (azala) and nullifies (yubtil, related to ibtāl) what the Devil insinuates"—refers "solely to eradication or nullification" according to scholar Al-Fakhr al-Razi.

In addition, traditional non-religious Arabic sayings, poetry, etc. used to determine the meaning of Quranic terms also suggest abrogation means either suppression or supersession. (Note: for example: nasakhat al-shams al-zill 'sunlight replaced shadow', and; nasakha al-shaib al-shabāb 'old age replaced youth ', and; nasakhat al-rīth al-āthār 'the wind obliterated the traces; Sayings like these are often used to try to determine how a word is used in the Quran.)

The verse Q.16:101 was employed by the founder of the Shafi'i school of Sunni Islamic jurisprudence — Imam Shafi'i — as proof that a Qur'anic verse can only be abrogated by another Qur'anic verse. (see below)

Dissenting views

Orthodox/pro-naskh scholars (like Ali b. Muhammad b. Ibrahim 'Ala al-Din, known as al-Khazin) argues that Abrogation Verse 2:106 was revealed in response to allegations by unbelievers in Mecca "that Muhammad decides a ruling, then abrogates it!". However, according to Mohammed al-Ghazali this explanation cannot be true because the verse was revealed in Mecca where at the time "no such laws" were being abrogated. Another argument against the orthodox interpretation of the verse is that the word translated as "revelation" (ayah) in the two Verses of Abrogation is ambiguous, and what is abrogated may be something other than a verse in the Quran. Ayah is more accurately translated (according to Khaleel Mohammed) as "sign" — as in a sign "sent down by God to guide humankind to Him" — revelation being only one kind of sign.

==== Satanic verses and abrogation ====
The one other Quranic verse using naskh in sense of abrogation is Q22:52.

- 22:52. "Never did We send a messenger or a prophet before thee, but, when he framed a desire, Satan threw some (vanity) into his desire: but Allah will cancel anything (vain) that Satan throws in, and Allah will confirm (and establish) His Signs: for Allah is full of Knowledge and Wisdom."

This verse is cited by historian and exegete Tabarī in connection with the incident of the so-called "Satanic Verses". Tabarī's interpretation (Tafsīr) states that God removed some of the early verses that the devil had cast into the Quran (making worship of other deities permissible) and replaced them in later verses. It supports an interpretation of naskh as eradication (izāla) so as not to be found in the written Quran (Mus'haf) and thus made acceptable the idea of naskh as the nullification of a verse and ruling — naskh al-hukm wa-'l-tilāwa — without any (immediate) replacement. Ibn Taymiyyah also identified "something that Satan has managed to insinuate into Revelation through Prophetic error" is naskh-ed by a divine verse, (which he calls al-naw' al-ikharmin al-naskh).

But later exegetes such as Makkī insist that since the verse was insinuated by the Devil into the Prophet's recital, and not revealed by God, that verse Q.22:52 only provides for establishes the Islamic legitimacy of the concept of naskh for satanic not divine revelation. According to the current orthodox interpretation, the verses were actually a fabrication by Quraysh tribesmen and enemies of Muhammad. However "a number" of classical scholars like Musa b. 'Uqbah, Ibn Ishaq, Abu Ma'shar, al-Tabari, Ibn al-Mundhir, Ibn Abi Hatim, Ibn Mardawayh and Ibn Hajar al-'Asqalam have accepted the report about this episode as genuine" (according to Ahmad Hasan), based on the isnad (chain of transmitters of the report), other eminent classical scholars reject the report which if it were true would mean "that Satan could tamper with the Divine Revelation".

=== Sunnah/hadith ===
==== Hadith/commentary abrogating Quranic verses ====
Evidence for the abrogation (or not) of Quranic verses comes from collections of hadith, and tafsir. Eight hadith in Sahih Bukhari mentions abrogation:

- the abrogation of the direction of prayer (the changing of the Qibla from Jerusalem to the Ka'ba—at Mecca)
- the abrogation Quran 2:184 is denied in #4505, but this is contradicted in #4506, and #4507.
- Quran 2:240, which is supposed to have been abrogated by Quran 2:234, is referred to in #4530, and in #4531. Yet other scholars say it wasn't abrogated since Quran 2:234 is mandatory mourning period without remarrying after her husband dies while Quran 2:240 is that inheritors don't force her out of her husband's house for a year unless she wanted to leave, which is why it says "then no blame on the guardians".
- that Quran 2:284 is abrogated is mentioned in #4545, and #4546.

Several hadith in Sahih Muslim mention abrogation of Quranic verses, including.

- the abrogation of Quran 2:284 by Quran 2:285 in #125.

Three verses in Sunan Abu Dawood, two verses in Malik's Muwatta and two verses in Tafsir ibn Kathir mention abrogation.

Abrogation of Hadith

As for abrogation of sunnah/hadith, there is no equivalent to the Quranic "Verses of abrogation" in the sunnah. No "generally accepted statements can be adduced from the sunnah to vindicate the application of the theory to Sunnah texts", according to John Burton. (Note: there is a hadith reporting that Abdullah ibn Umar heard Muhammad say 'Some of my hadiths supersede others`, but its isnad (chain of transmission) "is not regarded as credit-worthy by the Hadith specialists." However a Sahih Muslim hadith states: "Abu al. 'Ala' b. al-Shikhkhir said: The Messenger of Allah (may peace be upon him) abrogated some of his commands by others, just as the Qur'an abrogates some part with the other.") However scholars state that hadith were abrogated just as the Quran was. Kitab al-I'tibar states that early Muslim Urwah ibn Zubayr declared, "I testify that my father told me that the Prophet would make a statement, then subsequently replace in with another statement, just as the Quran, in certain places, supersedes other parts." Abu al-'Ala' ibn al-Shikhkhir (d. 107/725), a Tabi'i, (i.e. one of the generation of Muslims who followed the Sahaba -- the companions of Muhammad) is reported to have said much the same thing according to a Sahih Muslim hadith. (Note: Abu al. 'Ala' b. al-Shikhkhir said: The Messenger of Allah (ﷺ) abrogated some of his commands by others, just as the Qur'an abrogates some part with the other.)

== History ==
In "general terms", the idea of a divine process whereby the decisions of a monotheist God can be superseded by His later decisions precedes "even the foundation of Islam itself," (according to John Burton), being found in Epistle to the Hebrews 8:13; 10:9 of the New Testament.

While Muhammad is reported to have abrogated parts of the sunnah by "explicit abrogation" (see below), there are no reports of him talking about abrogated verses in the Quran or explaining any theory of abrogation. Thus the classical theory of naskh "cannot go back to the Prophet". This is an argument against the theory according to its opponents — "it is inconceivable that the Prophet had left such an important problem to the discretion of the people ..."

Reports of companions emphasizing its importance

There are, however, introductory stories in almost all classical naskh works about how (younger) companions of Muhammad — some of his "oldest and most determined supporters" revered by pious Muslims — emphasized the importance of belief in and knowledge of the theory of naskh. (Note: According to John Burton: "There is an extensive Islamic literature on naskh and at the forefront of most books devoted to this science, a sense of the crucial nature of this particular branch of learning is inculcated by the use of a series of hadiths which purport to establish the high antiquity, and hence in the eyes of Tradition-minded Muslims, the high respectability of the science of naskh by projecting its cultivation back into the generation of the Prophet's oldest and most determined supporters. ... ") Many recount an incident where a Kufan preacher is banned from expounding the Quran on account of his ignorance of the principles of naskh by an early 'ilmic authority figure (usually Rashidun Caliph 'Alī, but sometimes also Ibn 'Abbās, cousin of Muhammad and hadith narrator).

In one report Ali told a judge who had no knowledge of nasikh that he was "deluded and misleading others", in another he evicted a preacher from a mosque for being ignorant of the science of abrogation. Umar is reported to have told Muslims that despite the fact that Ubay ibn Ka'b was "the best Quranic expert among us ... we ignore some of what" he says because he disregarded abrogation and told others he refused to "abandon anything I heard from the Messenger of Allah".

Another set of Hadith emphasize how those who speak publicly on fiqh (Islamic law) without expert knowledge in naskh not only endanger their own immortal souls but also the souls of those who listening to them.

Some (John Burton) have questioned the authenticity of these hadith, finding them suspiciously convenient for proponents of naskh and especially for experts in the field. (Not only do they provide validity for the theory from "the mouths of men believed to have known the Prophet's mind best", but the reports specifically call for judicial or religious offices in the community to be occupied by those trained in "this indispensable knowledge".)

Early reliable evidence

However even if these reports were later fabrications and the rules of naskh were not directly passed down from Muhammad to the Salaf Muslims, it is known that the idea that some Qur'anic verses were abrogated can be found towards the end of the first century of Islam, and the development of theories of naskh can be dated "with certainty" to the time of Imam Shafi'i (d. 204 AH).

The early schools of law that were in existence towards the end of the first century of Islam included the idea of abrogation in the Qur'anic verses. Ibrahim al-Nakha'i (d. 96 AH/714) is reported to have said that the part of verse Q.5:106 — which allows a non-Muslim to bear witness to the bequest of a Muslim during a journey if the Muslim is on their death bed — was abrogated to require the witness to be a Muslim.

The principle of abrogation (without its naskh terminology) makes an early appearance in the Muwatta' of Mālik (d.179 AH/795) according to John Burton and Ahmad Hasan. (Note: Muwatta of Imam Malik is one of its earliest documented appearances according to Rippin, putting aside dubiously attributed works, such as the Naskh al-Qur-ān of "al-Zuhrī",) At one point Malik notes that "his teacher Zuhrī had told him that the Muslims had adopted as standard the latest of all the Prophet's reported actions" when there is a conflict. In another chapter Mālik states that of the two conflicting Qur'an rulings, "one had replaced the other". Elsewhere, Mālik "rejects the notion that a ruling remains valid despite the withdrawal" of the (supposed) Qur'an verse the ruling is based on. (Note: "In his review of the question of whether the Muslim traveler should observe or may postpone the obligation to fast during the month of Ramadān, which involves him in a comparison of conflicting opinion reported from many prominent Muslims of the past, including contradictory reports as to the practice of the Prophet himself, Mālik states that his teacher Zuhrī had told him that the Muslims had adopted as standard the latest of all the Prophet's reported actions... while in another chapter Mālik himself actually states that of the two relevant Kur'ān rulings, one had replaced the other. Elsewhere, Mālik rejects the notion that a ruling remains valid despite the reported withdrawal of the wording of the supposed Kur'ān 'verse' said to have originally imposed the ruling in question.")

However, according to Abdul-Rahim, "the earliest extant materials ever written" on the tafsir genre, naskh al-Qur'an came earlier than Malik. The two works — Kitab al-Nasikh wa al-Mansukh fi Kitab Allah Ta'ala by Qatadah ibn Di'amah al-Sadusi (d. 117/735) and Kitab al-Nasikh wa al-Mansukh by Muhammad ibn Muslim ibn Shihab al-Zuhri (d. 124/742). — begin "immediately to point to the abrogated in the Qur'an" feeling no need to elucidate what naskh is. According to Abdul-Rahim, the fact that these and other early works followed this practice indicates a "widespread understanding of naskh" in the Muslim world at that time.

Meaning

Naskh meaning evolved as early applications of the concept were abandoned (like other technical terms within Islamic exegesis — such as asbāb al-nuzūl, the historical context in which Quranic verses were revealed). In early works of tafsīr (before about 150 AH), Naskh was used to refer to a ruling that narrowed rather than replaced an earlier one (nasakha min [al-āya] — "an exception is provided to [the verse]"). This usage was later reformulated by Shāfi'ī as takhsīs (specification/exception).

Theory

The "elaboration of the theories" of naskh can be dated with certainty to the last half of the second century of Islam, when Imam Shafi'i (d.204 AH/820), in his work Risāla, (and in the somewhat later Ikhtilāf al-Hadīth") worked to resolve the "apparent discrepancies between certain Qur'ānic verses and others; between certain hadith and others; and, most serious of all, between certain Qur'ānic verses and certain hadīths", according to John Burton. Ibrahim al-Nakha'i (d. 96/714) is reported to have said that verse Q.5:106 was abrogated (Note: Q.5:106 allowed a non-Muslim to bear witness to the bequest of a Muslim during a journey if the Muslim is on their death bed, and was allegedly abrogated so that the witness had to be a Muslim.) Naskh as "a technical term meaning 'abrogation'" was used "early on in exegesis, for example, in Muqātil's [d. 149-150] Khams mi'a āya and his tafsīr. "'Ilm al-Nasikh wa'l-Mansukh" (Knowledge of the Abrogating and Abrogated) became one of the Islamic sciences.

John Burton argues, naskh become more important following the establishment of the principle of As-Shafi'i that hadith of Muhammad overruled all other reports from Companions or others on the same subject. This doctrine led to the growth in hadith attributed to the Prophet. Since "far too many" of these hadith "were mutually contradictory"—some contradicting the Quran -- "their use might court the risk" of failing to follow divine law (the view of some of the Mu'tazila of the era). For proponents of the As-Shafi'i doctrine a practical problem was the contradictions would lead to an abandonment of basing Islamic law on prophetic hadith.

Medieval times

At least by the eleventh century the classical concept of naskh of the Quran and Sunnah was widely accepted enough for one scholar — Ibn Hilal al-Nahwi — to assert that "whoever says" that there is no abrogation in Islam "is not a believer, but rather a kafir, denying that with which Muhammad came. He must renounce his position or be killed".

Modernist dissent

A "celebrated icon" of deniers and rejecters of naskh was the fourth-century Hijri scholar, Abu Muslim al-Isfahani, who was very much in the minority and whose work on naskh Jami'al-Ta'wil (al-Amidi, al-Ihkam, v.3, 115), has been lost to history. But "concentrated criticism of the abrogation concept only started in the latter part" of the nineteenth century, according to Khaleel Mohammad. According to Karel Steenbrink, "most" of the modernist or reformist scholars of that era (Muhammad Abduh, Sir Sayyid Ahmad Khan, and Rashid Rida), considered the theory of abrogation of the Quran invalid. Muhammad al-Ghazali, writing in 1992, stated

"the position taken by all the modern scholars whom I have met, or listened to, or whose works I have read, is contrary to the understanding of naskh that became so widespread among the later exegetes, namely that there exists naskh (if accepted) as meaning the abrogation of verses of the Qur'an."

Two lesser known scholars who wrote work and spoke against naskh of Islamic revelation in more depth in the 20th century were Muhammad Amin (an Azhar graduate, active at the beginning of the 20th century), and 'Abd al-Muta'al al-Jabri (who wrote his Master's thesis—entitled Naskh As I Understand It In The Islamic Shari'ah—at the University of Cairo in 1949).

== Need and scope ==
=== Dealing with apparent contradictions ===
Islam teaches that the Quran was revealed to Muhammad over 23 years (609–632 CE) until the year of his death. The customs and practices of Muhammad over this same period are known as the Sunnah, and reports of them are known as ahadith. From early in Islam's history, some scholars thought that contradictory commands existed in the Quran, among hadith of the Sunnah, as well as between verses of the Quran and the hadith.

Since Islam calls on humanity to obey the Quran and imitate the behavior of the prophet, and also because "a defining claim of Sunni Islam" is that no two authentic hadith could contradict each other or the Quran, (and because some verses in the Quran at least seemed to contradict each other) scholars worked to resolve these apparent contradictions in the verses that give regulations to Muslims. This became especially important, (as mentioned above), after the principle of fiqh was established that in forming Islamic law, hadith attributed to Muhammad overruled those attributed to all other early Muslims on the same issue. This led to the growth in the number of these hadith and contradictions between them, created a danger to their legitimacy as the basis of sharia law.

While hadith tell of rules of naskh being passed down directly from Muhammad's closest Companions (sahabah) and future Muslim leaders — others believe it more likely ideas about naskh originated later. Ahman Hasan speculates that the idea of the abrogation of certain Qur'anic verses "emerged" early in the history of Islam when commentators and the jurisconsults seeking to reconcile the "apparently contradictory verses", looked to the Quranic verses such as Q.16:101 — "... We put a revelation in place of (another) revelation ..." — to develop a theory that some later verses replaced the commands of earlier ones. John Burton argues that naskh was first employed by Islamic scholars ("usulis") in the second century of Islam working to develop principles (usul al-fiqh) for the Islamic law (fiqh) and seeking to explain why some fiqh rulings were not founded on Quranic/Sunnah revelation. By this time the Islamic empire spanned three continents and fiqh had been established in the different regions but usulis found rulings in certain verses of the Quran and parts of the Sunnah had been ignored in their formulation. To explain this, Burton argues, they developed the concept of naskh to declare that the verses/parts had been abrogated. (Note: According to John Burton, "the suppression of an original Quran ruling without, however, the suppression of the original wording as well, is the rationalisation worked out by usulis to explain instances in which they perceived certain Quran verse, or certain sunnas to be inoperative. Their rulings had not been taken up in the formulation of fiqh. Verses and hadiths alike had been ignored.")

In theory, naskh formed part of a hierarchy of techniques used by scholars of Islamic law working with hadith. Scholars first strove to "harmonize" hadith, (i.e. to make them fit together by reinterpreting them). If that failed they would look for signs of abrogation (that one saying/doing/inaction by Muhammad was earlier than the other and had been replaced by the later saying/doing/inaction). If there was no opportunity for abrogation, they would check the isnad—chains of transmission of the hadith—to see if the transmission of one hadith was superior to another. Finally, if they found no difference in the isnad, they would approve the hadith they found "closest to the overall message of the Quran and Sunnah".

Problem

But according to scholars such as David S. Powers and John Burton, while the doctrine of abrogation may have cleared up contradictions, it "poses a difficult theological problem" because it seems to suggest God was changing His mind, or has realized something He was unaware of when revealing the original verse. For an eternally all-knowing deity this was theologically impossible and logically absurd — in fact an act of "unbelief" in Islam itself. Also foreclosing on the possibility of any improvisation of Quranic verses was the belief of Sunni scholars that the Quran was not written/spoken during the course of its revelation, in fact not even created/written by God, but is as ageless as God himself, uncreated, an attribute of God (like being all-powerful, beneficent, merciful, etc.), its original copy being the "mother of the book" — umm al-kitab — kept in the presence of God (Q.13:39; Q.43:4), the earthly Quran being only a copy of it. (The Mu'tazila argued that the Qur'an could not be both eternal and subject to abrogation, with a new verse abrogating an earlier one.)

Skeptics such as Ali Dashti found the naskh process suspiciously similar to the human process of "revising ... past decisions or plans" after "learning from experience and recognising mistakes". When the Quran defends abrogation/naskh against those who scoffed at it ("Do not you know that Allah over every thing?" Q.2:106; "they say, "Thou art but a forger" ... Allah knows best what He reveals" Q.16:101), Dashti asks if the "scoffers" were suspicious "precisely because God is capable of everything", and so would have no need to abrogate a verse after revealing it.

Roslan Abdul-Rahim points out that after a verse was revealed criticizing Muslim slackers and urging Muslims to fight jihad, a blind Muslim ('Abd Allah ibn Umm Maktum) protested to Muhammad that his eyesight prevented him from fighting. "Almost instantaneously" another verse was sent down (Note: Roslan Abdul-Rahim describes the reports of the asbab or circumstances of the naskh as having "the potential to be even embarrassing for the Muslims".) amending the first with the qualifier "except the disabled". Quran 4:95. "Not equal are those among the believers who are 'seated' (at home) [except the disabled] and those who strive in the path of God with their possessions and their selves ...""

=== Rationale ===
At least in part in answer to these criticisms, some explanations and defenses have been offered for the theory of abrogation — principally that the revising of commands by God to his creatures is all done according to a plan.:

- aspects of the Quran's message and the Prophet's teachings had to change as circumstances changed in the Muslim community encountered over the course of Muhammad's more than two decade term as prophet
  - "one rule might not always be suitable for every situation. Far from Allah changing his mind, abrogation demonstrates the wisdom of Allah in legislating rules for their appropriate time and context. For most rules in Islam, there exist circumstances that warrant an exception to the rule." (Abu Amina Elias)
  - Rather than a way for scholars to deal with contradictions in scripture, preachers argued that naskh was God's way of dealing with different situations the Muslim community encountered over the course of Muhammad's more than two decade term as prophet. It "was quite possible for something to be beneficial for them in one situation, and detrimental in another", (such as fasting during Ramadan, where eating is allowed at night, but forbidden in the day), so that God might well abrogate something after it was no longer beneficial. (Ibn Qudamah)
  - "Islam abrogates all previous codes of which it is the perfection — If contemporary law is subject to constant alteration to meet changing conditions, why is it impossible that laws given to one people at one time should be abrogated elsewhere at another time?" (Al-Shahrastani)
  - Naskh an expression of "the notion that aspects of the Quran's message and the Prophet's teachings developed over time". (Or, since God is all knowing, naskh was said to be what happened when the expiration points were reached for of those rulings God intended as temporary all along.) (J.A.C. Brown)
  - God "knows the temporariness or permanence of any ruling from the time He issues it." (Louay Fatoohi)
- Major changes in behavior called for by Islam (banning of consumption of alcohol) should be abolished gradually, meaning that the early lenient commands are abrogated by later stricter ones — demonstrating that this abrogation was pre-planned, not the correction of a mistake;
- Alternately naskh provides takhfīf (lightening), abrogation "was generally directed to making things easier", (al-Suyuti) either by introducing a more lenient rule—or if introducing a more onerous one, helping believers by giving them the opportunity to earn greater reward in the Hereafter by obeying the challenging rule.
- Verses are abrogated to replace them with something that will improve human welfare. (Al-Zamakhshari)
- The 'style' of Divine revelation is "direct and absolute", without "clauses, exceptions and qualification". This makes necessary the occasional modification of these broad commands with "more specific" meanings, which is "generally" what naskh does. (Cyril Glasse)
- It serves a way for God to test the obedience of believers, who may be troubled and confused that God changed divine law to declares something good that at one time was denounced as evil and vice versa. (Ibn Kathir)
- Finally, the question "why?" itself is out of line.
  - "abrogation as a mechanism that perfectly reflects God's omnipotence. God can change any ruling with another at any point in time He sees fit" (Louay Fatoohi);
  - "God orders men's actions as He pleases and must not be asked what He is doing" (Al-Shahrastani);
  - "The sound mind does not deny that there could be a Naskh in Allah's commandments, for He decides what He wills, just as He does what He wills" (Ibn Kathir).

==== Alcohol ====
see:Khamr#Scriptural basis

The "classical" and oft cited example of how naskh was used in stages to guide a major change in the behavior of the faithful was the banning of alcohol, implemented in three verses. It has been described as an act of wisdom, needed because an abrupt total ban would have been too harsh and impractical. "Arab society in the beginning was not ready to abandon drinking alcohol. They needed to strengthen their faith in order to overcome their desire to drink."

The first verse gently discouraged Muslims from drinking alcohol:

- Quran 2:2:219. "They ask you about [the] intoxicants and [the] games of chance Say, "In both of them (is) a sin great, and (some) benefits for [the] people. But sin of both of them (is) greater than (the) benefit of (the) two."

The second prohibited Muslims from being drunk during one kind of activity—praying salat:

- Quran 4:43. "O you who believe[d]! (Do) not go near the prayer while you (are) intoxicated until you know what you are saying and not (when you are) impure except (when) passing (through) a way until you have bathed."

And finally, once Muslim were "ready for it", alcohol (along with gambling) was totally prohibited:

- Quran 5:90. "O you who believe! Verily the intoxicants and [the] games of chance and (sacrifices at) altars and divining arrows (are an) abomination from (the) work (of) the Shaitaan, so avoid it so that you may (be) successful."

==== Ratio of enemy warriors to Muslims ====
Two verses Imam Al-Shafi'i cites as "the clearest evidence" for naskh concern the number of enemies each Muslim warrior is expected to vanquish. (Unlike with those concerning alcohol, the abrogating verse is more lenient not more strict.)
A verse calling for overcoming ten unbelievers

- Quran 8:65. "Oh Prophet! incite the believers to war. If there be of you twenty patient believers, they will overcome two hundred; if there be of you one hundred, they will overcome one thousand of the unbelievers."

... is abrogated by one reducing the number of enemy Muslims are expected to fight to only two:

- Quran 8:66. "Now God has alleviated your burden, knowing that there is weakness in you. If there should be of you one hundred, they will overcome two hundred; if there should be of you one thousand, they will overcome two thousand ..." (Note: John Burton quotes Imam al-Shafi'i who quotes cousin of Muhammad and Quranic scholar Abd Allah ibn Abbas: `When the first verse was revealed, it was enjoined that twenty should not flee from two hundred. Subsequently, God revealed the second verse by which it was enjoined that one hundred should not flee from two hundred.`)

Another example of this takhfīf (lightening) is lifting the burden of lengthy nocturnal prayers in Quran 73:20 that had been required by Quran 73:1. (Note: John Burton quotes the scholar Abū Jaʿfar Muḥammad ibn Jarīr al-Ṭabarī (839–923 AD))

==== The Sword verse(s) ====
A verse(s) of major importance in Muslim-non-Muslim relations is Quran 9:5 the "Sword verse" (as, to a lesser extent, are similar verses such as Quran 9:29). Among "medieval exegetes and jurists" there was "a broad consensus that Quran 9:5 and Quran 9:29 (Note: Reuven Firestone refers to "four Quranic `Sword Verses`" of which Q.9:5 and Q.9:29 are two. According to the authoritative compiler of hadith al-Bukhari (810-70), stated that the 9th surah, Surah At-Tawbah, was the last surah revealed to Muhammad) abrogated "all the other statements" in the Quran "on the issue of waging war". (Note: "A broad consensus among medieval exegetes and jurists exists on the issue of waging war. The simplest and earliest solution of the problem of contradictions in the Quran was to consider Q.9:5 and Q.9:29 as abrogating all the other statements ... all restrictions were removed and all treaties with infidels were repudiated by Q.9:1-14 and the ultimate divine orders were expressed in Q.9:5 and Q.9:29.")

In modern times, the sword verse has been used by extremist groups and individuals to justify their killing of non-Muslims civilians, according to Lohay Fatoohi (although some dispute this), and Mahfuh Halimi argues extremist advocates of violence maintain the verse of the sword Q.9:5 abrogates "more than a hundred" verses of the Quran advising or advocating "peace, coexistence, patience, tolerance, and forgiveness as the basis for relations between Muslims and non-Muslims." (Note: Q.9:29 has also been called an abrogating verse.) Critics have called this a case of passages called for killing abrogating ones calling for tolerance. and a classic example of determining the validity of a verse by determining when it was revealed.

"Many verses counsel patience in the face of the mockery of the unbelievers, while other verses call for warfare against the unbelievers. The former are linked to the [earlier] Meccan phase of the mission when the Muslims were too few and weak to do other than endure insult; the latter are linked to Medina where the Prophet had acquired the numbers and the strength to hit back at his enemies. The discrepancy between the two sets of verses indicates that different situations call for different regulations."

Verses counseling patience and forbearance that are said to be abrogated by 9:5 (according to Fatoohi) include:

- Quran 3:186. "You will certainly be tested in your wealth and yourselves. And you will certainly hear from those who were given the Book before you and from those who associate partners with Allah hurtful things many, and if you are patient and fear (Allah) then indeed, that (is) of the matters of determination."
- Quran 53:29. "So turn away from (him) who turns away from Our Reminder and not he desires except the life (of) the world."
- Quran 43:89. "So turn away from them and say, "Peace." But soon they will know"

Similarly verse Q.9:29 is considered by Nahhās "to have abrogated virtually all verses calling for patience or forgiveness toward the People of the Book" (according to Reuven Firestone). (The verse abrogates more early verses of the Quran than any other according to some Muslim Islamic scholars, while others have concluded it does not abrogate any verses. (Note: Fatoohi argues that regardless of historical scholarship, when verse 9:5 is studied in the context of nearby verses and the fact that the Islamic scholars disagree with each other, it can be seen that the verse does not abrogate commands of earlier verses for Muslims to be tolerant of non-Muslims. Yaser Ellethy states that historical exegesis included Jews and Christians as the "Others" in the scope of abrogating verse 9:5, however, the historical analysis by Islamic scholars of "abrogating tolerance against Others" was baseless according to Ellethy. As to how many and which verses Q.9:5 abrogates, estimates of scholars vary widely.: Q.9:5 abrogated 124 verses (according to Hibat Allāh); less than 20 verses abrogated (according to al-Nahhās); less than 22 verses abrogated (counted by Ibn al Jawzī); less than 6 cases of abrogation (counted by Mustafā Zayd).; Q.9:5 abrogated "all pardoning, amnesty and forgiveness" that Muslims had previously been asked to show to non-Muslims by earlier Quranic verses (according to the 11th century Muslim scholar Makki bin Abi Talib quoted by Louay Fatoohi).; zero verses are abrogated (conclusion of az-Zarqaanee); Q.9:5 abrogated "every mention in the Quran of showing amnesty to the disbelievers, ignoring and turning away from them" (According to the 12th century Islamic scholar Ibn Al-Arabi, according to Fatoohi); Q.9:5 cannot abrogate all verses enjoining peaceful conduct because they are found not only in Meccan verses but also in abundance in non-Meccan, i.e. later Surahs, which would not be eligible for abrogation (according to Orientalist Thomas Walker Arnold); Many verses said to be abrogated apply to situations other than those that they were revealed for. Almost all of these 'abrogated' verses can still be said to apply when the Muslims are in a situation similar to the situation in which these verses were revealed.; 15 Quranic verses abrogated (Tabari); 16 verses abrogated by 9:5 (suggested by Al-Balkhi); 94 Quranic verses abrogated (Ibn Hazm); 116 Quranic verses abrogated (conclusion of Ibn Khuzayma); 124 Quranic verses abrogated (Ibn Salama and Ibn al-Arabi); Various medieval Islamic scholars, but not all, considered verse 9:5 abrogated Quranic verse 2:256 ("there is no compulsion in religion").; One opponent of abrogation of any part of the Quran -- Mohammed al-Ghazali -- denounces the belief that the verse of the sword abrogated "120 verses on the invitation to Islam" as "one of crassest stupidity and only serves to show that the great number of Muslims are in a stage of regression of either knowledge or intelligence in our time, and have become ignorant of the Qur'an".)

==== Length of the period (`iddah) widows must wait before remarrying ====
This abrogation has been called a "'classic' instance" of the "'classic' mode" of naskh by Usulis (i.e. students/scholars of the principles of fiqh) that 'proves' "the fact of Naskh". It (is thought to have) shortened the `iddah, i.e. the waiting period for widows (also divorcees, but these verses refer only to widows) before re-marriage, from one year ....

- Quran 2:240. "And those of you who die and leave behind wives should bequeath for their wives a year's maintenance and residence without turning them out, but if they (wives) leave, there is no sin on you for that which they do of themselves, provided it is honourable (e.g. lawful marriage). ...."

... to four months and ten days:

- Quran 2:234. "And those of you who die and leave wives behind them, they (the wives) shall wait (as regards their marriage) for four months and ten days, then when they have fulfilled their term, there is no sin on you if they (the wives) dispose of themselves in a just and honourable manner (i.e. they can marry). ..."

But Q.2:240 makes no mention of a waiting period before marriage, but only financial provisions ("maintenance and residence", aka matāʿ) for widows. And other scholars say it wasn't abrogated since Q.2:234 is about the mandatory mourning period for a woman without remarrying after her husband dies while Q.2:240 is that inheritors don't force her out of her husband's house for a year unless she wanted to leave, which is why it says "then no blame on the guardians". This did conflict with "the details of the rules to govern inheritances laboriously worked out in the fiqh", (according to non-Muslim critic and scholar John Burton). Burton argues that protecting established fiqh rulings from the contradiction of Quranic verses such as Q.2:240 (and not addressing conflicts between different lines of revelation) was what motivated the usulis who developed the theory of naskh.

==== Questions raised ====
In reply to the rationale of gradual introduction of the ban on alcohol, some (Farooq Ibrahim) have noted that while hadith often explain events that the Quran refers to cryptically, there is no explanation or mention of a strategy of gradual banning of alcohol consumption found in any Sahih hadith. Nor was a gradual process used in other Islamic prohibitions. The worship of multiple gods, and of having intercessors before God were both banned with no evident concern over whether they were too harsh or impractical.

Burton suggests that the idea that naskh can be explained as takhfīf (lightening) is of limited usefulness because it is applied to both naskh that make things easier for Muslims in the temporal world — like no longer requiring lengthy nocturnal prayers or lowering the number of enemies each Muslim warrior is expected to vanquish; and abrogation that makes things more difficult — for example, the extension of the ritual fast from a few days (Quran 2:184) to the entire month of Ramadan (Quran 2:185). Here the changes are claimed to be lightening because they will help Muslims attain a greater reward in the Hereafter. Still other abrogation — such as the switching of the qibla — would seem to have no effect on the difficulty or ease for Muslims of either temporal life or the afterlife.

The doctrine (expressed here by Louay Fatoohi) that God "knows the temporariness or permanence of any ruling from the time He issues it", seems hard to square with two verses mentioned above; where God promises that Muslim warriors will overcome ten times that number of unbelievers (Q.8:65), before revealing an abrogating verse — "Now God has alleviated your burden, knowing that there is weakness in you," and lowering the number of unbelievers promised to be overcome to only double the number of Muslims (Q.8:66), suggesting that God abrogates after learning of an area of Muslims' weakness.

A question raised over how aspects of the Quran's message and the Prophet's teachings needed to change over the course of Muhammad's mission as times/circumstances changed, was why the need for change stopped with the death of Muhammad. Muhammad Abduh (reputedly) asks why naskh was employed during the 23 years of the Quran's revelation, but could not be employed over the next 1400+ years when social & life changes were far greater.

=== Limits of application ===
Scholars have proposed some limits on the application of abrogation.

Naskh concerns itself with only revelations pertaining to positive laws — commandments (amr) or prohibitions (nahy).) In Tabarī's words:

God alters what was once declared lawful into unlawful, or vice-versa; what was legally unregulated into prohibited and vice-versa. But such changes can occur only in verses conveying commands, positive and negative. Verses cast in the indicative and conveying narrative statements, can be affected by neither nāsikh [abrogating material] nor mansūkh [abrogated material].

(However, according to John Burton, this was not true among "some of the oldest exegetes" who "included indiscriminately under naskh all and every verse where they noted a degree of contradiction, however slight ...")

Naskh is applied almost exclusively to the Qur'an and the Sunnah. According to Mohammad Hashim Kamali, its application to Ijma` and Qiyas — secondary sources of Sunni Islamic law unlike the Qur'an and the Sunnah not divinely revealed — "has been generally overruled", as abrogation "is not relevant" to Ijma (the consensus or agreement of Muslim scholars on a religious issue), and the theory of naskh "has no place" in Qiyas (the process of deductive analogy in Islamic scripture in order to apply a known injunction (nass) to a new circumstance and create a new injunction). Islamic jurists cannot abrogate, it is confined to the lifetime of the Prophet in the Qur'an and Sunnah.

In addition, subjects of Islam that Naskh does not apply to include:

- Attributes of God,
- Belief in the principles of the faith,
- the doctrine of Tawhid (monotheism/oneness of God)
- the doctrine of the hereafter.
- the Sharia of Islam itself
- the ulema (scholars of Islam) are also in agreement "that rational matters and moral truths such as the virtue of doing justice or being good to one's parents, are not changeable and are therefore not open to abrogation".

If these conditions are met, there are several more that must be satisfied concerning the text to be abrogated and the text abrogating:

- the two texts must be of "equal strength in regard to authenticity (thubut) and meaning (dalalah)" — otherwise the weaker test is over ruled;
- the two texts must be "genuinely in conflict" — otherwise they should be reconciled with one another;
- the two texts must be "separate and are not related to one another in the sense of one being the condition (shart), qualification (wasf) or exception (istithna) to the other".

According to scholar John Burton three "elements" are necessary "in any one alleged instance of naskh", namely:

a) the divine origin of both injunctions;
b) a conflict between two enactments such that it is `quite impossible to implement the two texts jointly`
c) knowledge of the relative dates of both revelations.

Scholar Recep Dogan, gives "types of evidence" allowed for naskh. (These are also three in number, but only one — chronology — is the same as Burton's "necessary elements"):

a) report(s) from Muhammad or his companions,
b) ijma (consensus of the mujtahids upon naskh), and
c) knowledge of the chronology of the Qur'anic revelation.

Chronology

Since an abrogating verse must have been revealed after the verse it abrogates, the validity of abrogation requires a knowledge of the chronology of the primary sources. This has historically been a difficult task because the verses in the Qur'an are not arranged by chronology but rather by size of chapters, and even within a chapter, the verses are non-chronologically arranged, so that the context of each revelation is not ascertainable from verses near a verse, or the sequential verse number. Verses Q.2:190, Q.2:191 and Q.2:192, for example, were revealed to Muhammad six years after the verse Q.2:193. Thus chronology depends on "the agreement of scholars" (ijma) and on Tafsir reports or the recollection of Hadith transmitters to explain which verse or prophetic statement was revealed before another. (According to at least one non-Muslim scholar — Andrew Rippin — naskh texts in Islam have not demonstrated that verses rendered invalid by shariah law were revealed earlier, but simply assumed they must have been.)

== Types/varieties ==
=== Implicit and explicit naskh ===
Most cases of naskh are "implicit" (dimni) — i.e. as noted above they depend on "the agreement of scholars" (ijma) to determine if a verse was abrogated. However, a few revelations involve "explicit" (sarih) naskh, specifically mentioning some earlier command to be abrogated and replaced with another — though none of them use any form of the word naskh.

- Quranic verses 2:143-50 commands Muhammad and the Muslims to turn their faces away from 'the direction of prayer that you faced before' (Jerusalem) to a new one, one that 'pleases your heart,' (by which is meant the Kaaba in the Al-Haram Mosque of Mecca).
- In one hadith Muhammad is reported to have said: 'I had prohibited you from visiting graves, but visit them, for indeed in visiting them there is a reminder [of death].'

=== Total and partial naskh ===
Abrogation may be divided into two more types: total abrogation and partial abrogation:

"Total abrogation"

In the case of "total abrogation" (or naskh kulli), all of the specific statement within the Quran or hadith that the ruling is based on (the nass) is abrogated by another, and a new ruling (hukm) is enacted to replace the entire old ruling. An example is found in two Qur'anic verses on the waiting period (`iddah) of widows before remarriage.
Al-Baqarah 240 has been interpreted to prescribe a waiting period of one year:

- Quran 2:240. "And those of you who die and leave behind wives should bequeath for their wives a year's maintenance and residence without turning them out, but if they (wives) leave, there is no sin on you for that which they do of themselves, provided it is honourable (e.g. lawful marriage). And Allâh is All-Mighty, All-Wise"

But another verse shortened the waiting period to four months and ten days:

- Quran 2:234. "And those of you who die and leave wives behind them, they (the wives) shall wait (as regards their marriage) for four months and ten days, then when they have fulfilled their term, there is no sin on you if they (the wives) dispose of themselves in a just and honourable manner (i.e. they can marry). And Allâh is Well-Acquainted with what you do"

"Partial abrogation"

In the case of "partial abrogation" (naskh juzi), one verse is only partially abrogated by another. The part not abrogated remains operative. An example of this is the Qur'anic verse on slanderous accusations of adultery against women (known as qadhf). The "ayah of qadhf" — An-Nur 4 — establishes a general rule that anyone who accuses chaste women of adultery (zina) must produce four witnesses for proof:

- Quran 24:4. "And those who accuse chaste women, and produce not four witnesses, flog them with eighty stripes, and reject their testimony forever, They indeed are the Fâsiqûn (liars, rebels, those disobedient to Allâh)"

The "ayah of imprecation" (li'an) — an-Nur 6 — replaces the four witnesses requirement, but only for one kind of person — the husband of the alleged adulteress. It allowing him to pursue charges of zina against his wife provided he takes four different oaths to tell the truth and invoked the curse of God upon himself if he is telling a lie. This partially repeals Ayah Q.24:4.

- Quran 24:6. "And for those who accuse their wives, but have no witnesses except themselves, let the testimony of one of them be four testimonies (i.e. testifies four times) by Allâh that he is one of those who speak the truth"

takhsees

Takhsees ['specification', also spelled takhsis] and istithnā (exception) resemble "partial naskh" described above. Like partial naskh, takhsees qualifies a general ruling [aam], so that it only applies in certain cases.

Examples include

1. the qualification of the Quranic injunction in Q.5:38 to amputate the hand of the thief, the takhsees given by Muhammad requires that the thief must have stole something above a certain value.
2. the qualification on entering uninhabited houses. verse Q.24:27 states: 'Do not enter houses other than your houses,' but verse Q.24:29 gives an exception: 'There is no blame upon you for entering houses not inhabited in which there is convenience for you.' (At-Tabari)

Takhees is sometimes called another name for partial naskh. However (according to Deen Communication Limited), Takhsees differs from naskh in that

- it may involve revelations making observations, predictions, etc., rather than laws and rulings [ahkaam];
- it need not be revealed after the verse/hadith it is qualifying; and
- need not be restricted to the Qur"an or Sunnah, but may apply to ijmaa`, or qiyaas and
- may be based on common sense or ijtihaad.

=== Naskh of ruling, Naskh of verse, or both ===
Another set of types of naskh are those divided by what is abrogated — ruling, text, or both. (John Burton calls these the three "modes" of the theory of naskh.)

1. naskh al-hukm dūna al-tilāwa, also 'supersession' or ibdal. The types of naskh mentioned above involve abrogation of an Islamic regulation/ruling (hukm), but not the text it is based on. If the regulation/ruling is based on a Qur'ānic verse, that verse is still found in the Mus'haf (the written Quran). This mode of naskh — known as — has received widespread recognition, and has been called the "classic" mode of naskh.

But there are two other less accepted (and much less common) varieties of naskh that do abrogate text, i.e. involve revealed verses that were omitted from the text of the Mus'haf(and thus creates a distinction between the Qur'an as temporally contingent document-i.e. the mus'haf- and the Qur'an as the unity of all revelation ever sent down to Muhammed). (These naskh do not involve Sunnah/hadith because if the wording of a hadith was deleted during the time of Muhammad, there is no way of knowing it ever existed.)

2. naskh al-tilāwa dūna al-hukm (also naskh al-tilawah or naskh al-qira'ah), is the abrogation of the wording but not the ruling. In this mode of abrogation, Quranic text (this naskh does not apply to the Sunnah) is deleted, but the rule is a still-functional. Proof of the verse's existence is preserved within tradition (i.e through a hadith report) as well as in the Fiqh; and
3. naskh al-hukm wa al-tilawah, (also known as ibtal or suppression), that is abrogation of both the verse and the ruling.

According to Ahmad Hassan, these last two types of abrogation of wording/scripture are "not supported by conclusive evidence". According to John Burton, one of the two types -- #2, abrogation of the wording but not the ruling—is acknowledged "only by a minority of scholars".

1. naskh al-hukm dūna al-tilāwa

Examples of verses in the written Quran (Mus'haf) that no longer provide a basis for a regulation/ruling (hukm) include most cases of abrogation mentioned above (the two cases of explicit abrogation that involved hadith being the exceptions).

Some have asked why the verses were not edited out of the mus'haf when it was compiled. Doesn't retaining the verse run the risk of causing confusion to those inadvertently following the repealed rule? A number of rationales have been given for the practice. Tampering/doctoring with sacred texts has been rejected since medieval times — according to Liaquat Ali Khan. Al-Suyuti gives two reasons for their not being purged:
1) it was meritorious to recite the Word of Allah, whether or not the verses had been abrogated;

...the Qur'ān was revealed so that its rulings might be known and their implementation rewarded; but... the Qur'ān is also recited with reverence, since it is the word of God, for whose recitation the pious Muslim is likewise rewarded. Further, to leave the wording, following the abrogation of the ruling was to provide for men a constant reminder of the compassion and mercy shown by their gracious Lord [ar-Rahman] Who had lightened the burden of some his previous requirements. (Note: Al-Itqān fi 'Ulum Al-Qur'an by Suyūti)

2) the verses were "a reminder of God's mercy", since abrogation "was generally directed to making things easier", Muslim could read them and see how their burden had been eased by God's abrogation.

Another question raised is whether abrogating rulings (al-hukm) but not Quranic wording (al-tilawa) contradicts the verse of abrogation Q.2:106 which states "any ayah We cause to be superseded or forgotten, We replace with something better or similar", and not "any hukm We cause to be superseded or forgotten ..." The Arabic word Ayah, is the word used in the Quran for verses in that book, although it is also used for other of God's "signs". (Note: Both of the "Abrogation verses" -- Q.16:101 and Q.2:106 -- use the word ayahs in talking about what is being abrogated. According to at least one scholar, John Burton, there is little dispute over the meaning of the word: "with the notable exception of Abu Muslim al-Isfahani, all Muslim scholars were unanimous in assuming that the word [ayah] could have no other meaning than 'a verse of the Qur'an'".) If God intended for sharia rulings and not wording to be abrogated why wouldn't verse Q.2:106 say so? Tafsir scholar Tabarī ingeniously explains this problem away by noting that the faithful believe that no one part of the Quran can be "superior" to any other part (because the Qur'an was composed by the divine author and is Mu'jaz, or so miraculous it is impossible to imitate). However 2:106 talks of God replacing ayah "with something better or similar". Since all verses of the Quran are all equally wondrous, ayah in this context cannot be referring to the words of the Quran. The principle of mu'jaz, however, does not carry over to shari'a law whose wording is not divine (those its substance is) and whose quality may vary in excellence. Thus, by process of elimination, John Burton explains, "the only other thing it [ayah in Q.2:106] can refer to is the ruling derived from the verse," i.e. "the rulings of the shari'a", hukm.

Still another issue was how ayah could be forgotten ("cause to be forgotten") when a prophet like Muhammad was meant to be protected from flaws like forgetting. This was explained by modifying the definition of "cause to be forgotten" ('aw nasaha) to "defer" or "leave".

2. naskh al-tilāwa dūna al-hukm

This form of naskh — abrogation of the wording (al-tilāwa) of some part of the Quran but not the ruling (al-hukm) based on that part — is acknowledged "only by a minority of scholars".

The traditional evidence offered for it is the lack of verses for rajm [stoning adulterers], and rada [kinship from breastfeeding] in the Quran, notwithstanding the fact that both are generally accepted parts of traditional Islamic law. In the first case, a punishment of stoning to death (lapidation) for adultery is found in the Islamic law of the founders of all four surviving schools of Sunni fiqh (madhab) and by the majority of scholars of fiqh, but the penalty prescribed for adultery in the mus'haf is flogging (in Q.24:2).

An explanation for this is that a "stoning verse" (āyat al-rajm) was abrogated but not the ruling. (Another is that hadith calling for the stoning punishment abrogate the flogging punishment in the Quran, see below.) Muhammad's favorite wife Ā'isha, claims that there was a stoning verse in Quran that was lost, as do other hadith. (John Burton quotes a commentary/gloss on Aisha's hadith describing how she might explain the abrogation of text.)

We were too occupied with the preparations in the Prophet's sick-room to give any thought to the safe-keeping of the sheets on which the revelations had been written out, and while we were tending our patient, a household animal got in from the yard and gobbled up some of the sheets which were kept below the bedding. Those who would account for all events here below in terms of divine agency could see in this most unfortunate mishap nothing incongruous with the divine promise, having revealed the Reminder, to preserve it. Here, indeed, was the working of the divine purpose... their removal, as an aspect of the divine revelatory procedures had been determined by God and had occurred under effective divine control. Having determined that these 'verses' would not appear in the final draft of His Book, God had arranged for their removal. The revelation was never, at any time, at the mercy of accidental forces.

However, evidence for the existence of this verse has been criticized as weak, the hadith unreliable, (Note: (Some Muslim scholars have rejected the hadith describing how the stoning verse did not make it into the mus'haf as Mawdoo (fabricated) because the common routes of transmission of it either contain narrators charged with dishonesty when disclosing their sources, or (in the case of the version in Ibn Hanbal's Musnad) conflict with all versions of the hadith which bear authentic routes — none of which mention the goat eating the piece of paper.)) and followers of Maliki and Hanafi fiqh believe evidence for stoning being the proper Islamic punishment comes not from an alleged Quranic verse but from reports of Muhammad calling for execution of adulterers by stoning found in collections of sound (sahih) hadith — meaning that the hadith on stoning abrogate the flogging verse in the Quran. Ahmad Hasan agrees that the punishment of rajm is based on the Sunnah of the prophet and argues that the wording of the Verse of Rajm found in hadith "appears to be manifestly of a different style than that of the Quranic verses". He also believes that 'Umar's explanation for not including it in the mus'haf does not make sense.

Sahih al-Bukhari 6829, Book 86, Hadith 56, Hadith 816 states:

`Umar said, "I am afraid that after a long time has passed, people may say, "We do not find the Verses of the Rajam (stoning to death) in the Holy Book," and consequently they may go astray by leaving an obligation that Allah has revealed. Lo! I confirm that the penalty of Rajam be inflicted on him who commits illegal sexual intercourse, ...

Roslan Abdul-Rahim argues "the cases of rajm [stoning], and rada [kinship from breastfeeding] do not support this form of abrogation:

The trouble with this understanding however is, Q.2:106, the report of Ubayy questioning the Prophet, and the exchange between 'Abd Allah ibn Zubayr with 'Uthman ibn 'Affan, all suggest that naskh is not synonymous with forgetfulness, disappearance of revelations or the exclusion of revelatory texts from the Qur'an.

('Abd Allah ibn al-Zubayr, once allegedly asked 'Uthman why Q.2:240 was still included in the Qur'an despite having been repealed. 'Uthman reportedly answered, "O my nephew, I will not change anything from it (Qur'an) from its place", suggesting abrogated verses were not deleted.)

This form of naskh also poses the question of why a verse important enough to be the basis of immutable hukm (ruling) dealing with life and death would disappear from the written Quran (mus'haf), and what scripture allows it.

Another report used to support naskh al-tilāwa dūna al-hukm — where Aisha states that a Quranic verse requiring only five suckling of a child to establish foster-parentship was abrogated but which later became the basis of a certain rule in Islamic law — is argued against by Ahmad Hasan on the grounds that rule was rejected by "the ancient schools of [Islamic] law". Hasan also argues against the report that some surahs (muawwadhatdn) were not included in the mus'haf saying that "certain companions" heard Muhammad reciting a qunut or du'a prayer and thought it was part of the Qur'an.)

In support of this form of naskh was Al-Shafi'i, who disagreed with Maliki and Hanafi and maintained that the Sunnah cannot abrogate the Quran and the Quran cannot abrogate the Sunnah. (This left naskh al-tilāwa dūna al-hukm as the way to explain the punishment of stoning.) While Shāfi'ī never postulated the existence of a "stoning verse", he did acknowledge the probability of "abrogation of wording but not ruling", as well as acknowledging Aisha's claim that there was a stoning verse in Quran, which had been lost.

3. naskh al-hukm wa-'l-tilāwa

Examples of abrogation of both ruling and wording — where a ruling is voided and its text omitted from the mus'haf so that the only evidence that it ever existed is in hadith — include the alleged "Satanic Verses" mentioned above, and a (much less controversial) report on how a wet nurse may become a foster parent, (specifically on how many times a wet nurse may breast-feed someone's child before that child is forbidden to marry any of the wet nurse's natural children. A hadith attributed to Aisha states that "among the things that were revealed of the Qur'an was that ten definite breastfeedings make a person a mahram".

Liaquat Ali Khan states that "very few Muslim jurists concede that any portion of the Quran has been removed" through this mode of abrogation. And John Burton writes that this mode is generally acknowledged, in part due to the many alleged instances of revelation being erased:

Of special importance were allegations of actual omissions from the revelation such as those recording the "loss" of a verse in praise of the Bi'r Ma'ūna martyrs, the Ibn Ādam "verse" and reports on the alleged originally longer versions of sūras IX or XXXIII, said to have once been as long as sūra II and to have been the locus of the stoning "verse" [ āyat al-rajm ]. Lists were compiled of revelations verifiably received by Muhammad and publicly recited during his lifetime until subsequently withdrawn (raf'), with the result that when the divine revelations were finally brought together into book-form, there was collected into the mus'haf only what could still be recovered following the death of the Prophet. The mus'haf has from the outset been incomplete relative to the revelation, but complete in that we have all that God intended us to have.

As to how both ruling and wording were abrogated, supporters point to divine intervention into the memories of Muhammad and his companions causing them to forget a revelation.

"Qur'ān-forgetting is clearly adumbrated in the Qur'ān", according to Burton, and couple of verses of the Quran talk of God taking away a revelation or causing it to be forgotten:

- Quran 2:106. "Any revelation We cause to be superseded or forgotten, We replace with something better or similar. Do you [Prophet] not know that God has power over everything?"
- Quran 87:6–7. "We shall make you to recite (the Qur'an), so you (O Muhammad) shall not forget (it), Except what Allah may will"

A number of hadith also attest to the phenomenon of forgetting revelation — some describing the forgetting as "a natural failure" of Muhammad's or companions memory, and others as a "miraculous intervention" by God. One claims that entire suras which the Muslims had previously recited, would be discovered one morning to have been completely erased from memory.

The question of whether not just some but all abrogated verses (mansukh) were deleted from the mushaf, (meaning that contrary to scholarly consensus, there is no "classic" mode of naskh, no #1. naskh al-hukm dūna al-tilāwa, because nothing included in the mushaf has been abrogated, no mansukh is found there) has been raised by Roslan Abdul-Rahim.

According to Roslan Abdul-Rahim, one Bukhari hadith reports that the compiler of the mushaf himself — the third calif Uthman ibn Affan — declared that he would not "shift [any verse] from its place", indicating no verses would have been excluded from the Mushaf, even if abrogated.

- Hadith. Sahih al-Bukhari, Book 6: Volume 60: Hadith 53 Ibn Az-Zubair 'said to 'Uthman bin 'Affan (while he was collecting the Qur'an) regarding the Verse: "Those of you who die and leave wives ..." (2.240) "This Verse was abrogated by another Verse. So why should you write it? (Or leave it in the Qur'an)?" 'Uthman said. "O son of my brother! I will not shift anything of it from its place."'

In addition, according to Abdul-Rahim, verse Q.2:106 and the report of Ubai questioning the Prophet, also suggest that naskh is not synonymous with forgetfulness of revelation. ('Abd al-Rahman b. Abza reports that on one occasion, the scribe Ubayy—noticing that Muhammad had skipped a previously recited verse -- "asked if the Prophet had forgotten a verse or that it had been abrogated ...")

=== Abrogation of Quran and Sunnah by one another ===
Yet another way of classifying naskh is by what kind of revelation is abrogated and what kind is abrogating. Some scholars (a minority) believe that different types of revelation cannot abrogate each other — a part of the Sunnah can never abrogate a verse of the Quran and vice versa. Distinguishing between which of the two kinds of revelations are involved in abrogating and in being abrogated creates four variations of naskh in this classification:

1. a ruling from a verse of the Quran is abrogated by another conflicting ruling from another verse in the Quran (almost all the examples of naskh mentioned above are this form);
2. a ruling in the Sunnah is abrogated by another conflicting ruling from the hadith (the two examples of Explicit Abrogation mentioned above — visiting graves and storing sacrificial meat — are examples of this form of naskh);
3. a ruling from a verse of the Quran is abrogated by a conflicting hadith (an example being the abrogation of the ayah of bequest in al-Baqarah 2:180 explained below):
4. when a ruling from the Sunnah is abrogated by a conflicting ruling from a verse in the Qur'an (an example being the change in the qiblah from Jerusalem to Mecca, a Sunnah practice abrogated by Q.2:144, also explained below).

Regarding variety #3, (Sunnah abrogating the Quran), a consensus of scholars believe that Quranic verse 2:180 — the "ayah of bequest" in al-Baqarah:

- Quran 2:180. "It is prescribed for you, when death approaches any of you, if he leaves wealth, that he make a bequest to parents and next of kin, according to reasonable manners. (This is) a duty upon Al-Muttaqûn (the pious)"

...has been abrogated by a hadith included in Sunan Abu Dawood collection.

- Abu Dawud, Sunan Abi Dawud 2870. "... no bequest must be made to an heir."

An example of variety #4, (abrogation of part of the Sunnah by a Qur'anic verse) is found above as an example of Explicit Naskh above — namely what the qiblah (direction facing during salah prayer) should be. This direction was originally Jerusalem/Quds according to hadith included in the collection Sahih al-Bukhari (41)

- ... when the Prophet first came to Madinah ... he prayed facing towards Bayt al-Maqdis for sixteen or seventeen months." (John Burton notes that there is no reference in the Quran to praying in the direction of Jerusalem.)

... was abrogated by Ayah 144 of Surah al-Baqarah:

- Quran 2:144. "And whosesoever you people are, turn your faces (in prayer) in that direction. Certainly, the people who were given the Scriptures (i.e. Jews and the Christians) know well that, that (your turning towards the direction of the Ka'bah at Makkah in prayers) is the truth from their Lord. And Allâh is not unaware of what they do."

==== Arguments on abrogation between sources ====
While abrogation by the same type of revelation — i.e. varieties #1 and #2 — are accepted by all scholars (i.e. all who support the orthodox theory of abrogation), abrogation between types of revelation — #3 and #4 — are not.

The scope of Naskh doctrine between sources has been one of the major differences between the Shafi'i and Hanafi fiqhs, with Shafi'i sect of jurisprudence forbidding abrogation by the Sunnah of the Qur'ān, while Hanafi sect allowing abrogation by the Sunnah of the Qur'ān.

The Maliki, Shafi'i and Hanbali schools of Sunni Islam maintained that a Sunnah practice from a Hadith can never abrogate a Quranic verse, (according to Yusuf Suiçmez). In contrast, the Hanafi fiqh of Sunni Islam, from the days of Abu Hanifa, along with his disciples such as Abu Yusuf, believe that Sunnah can abrogate a Quranic verse.

- Quran 16:101. "And when We change a Verse [of the Qur'ân] in place of another. And Allâh knows the best what He sends down."
- Quran 10:15. "And when Our Clear Verses are recited unto them, those who hope not for their meeting with Us, say: Bring us a Qur'ân other than this, or change it. "Say (O Muhammad): "It is not for me to change it on my own accord; I only follow that which is revealed unto me. Verily, I fear the torment of the Great Day (i.e. the Day of Resurrection). If I were to disobey my Lord.""

(Q.10:15 specifically refers to the Quran and both verses uses the word ayah, which is the term used to refer to Quranic verses — although as mentioned earlier ayah is also used to refer to other "signs" of God.)

For Al-Shāfi'ī "I merely follow what is being revealed to me" in Quran 10:15 meant to that "the sunnah cannot abrogate the Book" but only "follow what it laid down in" it, (according to Yusuf Suiçmez).

Al-Shafi'i adduces Q.2:106 as "categorically" allowing abrogation of the Quran only by the Quran, according to Ahmad Hasan, and argues that the Quran cannot abrogate the Sunnah because if this were allowed a "host of rules framed by the Prophet would be cancelled". (Stoning of adulterers would be replaced by flogging, etc.) According to another scholar, (John Burton), Al-Shafi'i argues that it is not possible for the Quran to abrogate the Sunnah because "were a Sunnah to be replaced, for example by a Quran revelation, a fresh Sunnah would accompany this revelation, in order to demonstrate that the Prophet's later Sunnah had superseded his earlier Sunnah ...", i.e. having spoken a revelation contradicting what he said or did to his companions, God's messenger would correct what he spoke or did.

"Shāfi'ī set his face decidedly against any acceptance of the idea then current that in all such cases the Qur'ān had abrogated the Sunnah, or the Sunnah the Qur'ān," Burton writes. Shafi'i insisted that "... any verbal discrepancies between the Qur'ān and the reported sayings or reports of the practices of Muhammed — the Sunnah of the Prophet" were illusions that "could always be removed on the basis of a satisfactory understanding of the mechanism of revelation and the function of the prophet-figure".

Shafi'i's stance was a reaction to larger developments within Islamic jurisprudence, particularly the reformulation of the fiqh away from early foreign or regional influences and toward more eminently Islamic bases such as the Quran. This assertion of Qur'anic primacy was accompanied by calls for an abandonment of the Sunnah. Shāfi'ī's insistence upon the impossibility of contradiction between Sunnah and Qur'an can thus be seen as one component in this larger effort of rescuing the Sunnah:

According to Burton, another argument against this "crossover" of types of revelation in abrogation revolved around concern that unbelievers would use it to argue against the validity of Islam. If the Sunnah "naskhed" the Quran, unbelievers would be able to say that "Muhammad was saying or doing the opposite of what he alleged was being revealed to him by God"; while if the Quran abrogated the Sunnah they could claim that "God was belying the man who claimed to be His Prophet". (Note: John Burton writes, "One argument was that if the Sunnah had naskhed the Kuran, the unbelievers might have argued that Muhammad was saying or doing the opposite of what he alleged was being revealed to him by God; if the Kuran had naskhed the Sunna, they could have taunted Muhammad by pointing out that God was belying the man who claimed to be His Prophet. Either way, Muhammad's credibility would have suffered.")

Replies

One reply to these arguments against crossover of kinds of revelation in abrogation was that the Sunnah — like the Quran — "had also been revealed to Muhammad", and if the Sunnah abrogated the Quran or vice versa, it was "merely" a matter of "one element of revelation" replacing "another". The argument that the Sunnah/Muhammad's actions were of divine origin/revelation was based on Quranic verse

- Quran 53:2–3. "Muhammad does not speak from whim; this is really divine inspiration`"

(The opposite point of view — that the Sunnah could not naskh the Quran was based on:)

- Quran 10:15. ".... `Say: "It is not for me to alter it on my own initiative; I merely follow what is being revealed to me"'..."

While for Al-Shāfi'ī, "I merely follow what is being revealed to me" in Quran 10:15 meant to that "the sunnah cannot abrogate the Book" but only "follow what it laid down in" it, the Hanafi jurists used that verse to justify their opinion that abrogation of the Qur'an by the life actions of Muhammad (Sunnah) was based solely on his Divine inspiration, that when he acted or said anything, any abrogation implicit through his action, of the earlier Qur'anic ruling was from Allah alone. Hanafi school stated, adds Suicmez, that to accept that "a Sunnah can abrogate the Qur'an entails honoring of Muhammad".

Another argument for allowing abrogation between the Quran and the Sunnah and against the Al-Shafi'i position that Burton believes had no effective counter-argument was the issue of the penalty for adultery in Islamic law. As mentioned above this was stoning death (something widely supported by the Sunni schools of fiqh including the school of Al-Shafi'i, but this punishment was found only in the Sunnah; in the Quran, verse Q.24:2 clearly called for 100 strokes of the lash — not execution — as a penalty for adultery. The only explanation for this was that this point of Islamic law was based on abrogation of the Quran by the Sunnah.

=== Abrogation of Jewish and Christian texts ===
One type of abrogation over which there is little dispute among Muslims is "external naskh", the abrogation of earlier Jewish and Christian religious laws handed down in the Tanakh and New Testament by Islamic revelation. John Burton states that it "cannot be doubted" that Muhammad believed this. A wide variety of Islamic scholars — Syed Ahmad Khan, — also states that naskh applies "between religions", i.e. that the Qur'an has cancelled "the laws enunciated in the earlier Divine Scriptures like the Old and the New Testaments".

=== Quantity ===
There has never been a consensus among Islamic jurists about which and how many Quranic passages (or Sunnah in the Hadiths) naskh affects. Neal Robinson sees scholars estimation of the number of abrogating verses waxing and then waning over the centuries.

Az-Zuhri (d.742), an early authority in the subject, held that 42 ayas had been abrogated. After his time, the number steadily increased until an upper limit was reached in the eleventh century, with Ibn Salama claiming that there were 238 abrogated ayas, and al-Farisi claiming that there were 248. In subsequent generations, a reaction set in: Egyptian polymath al-Suyuti (d.1505) claimed that there were only 20, and Shah Wali Allah of Delhi (d.1762) whittled the number down to 5. (Note: John Burton also sees a rise and fall in the number of naskh revelation. Falling to 20 by Suyuti's count and seven by Mustafa Zayd's. Burton argues it should be even lower.)

David S. Power gives a higher peak number of abrogated verses of over 550 at around the 10th century CE. According to John Burton, the number of verses alleged to have been expunged from the mus'haf (internal naskh within the Quran or naskh al-hukm wa-'l-tilāwa) was higher—564 verses or almost 1/10 of the total content of the mus'haf

Far smaller tallies include:

- The 10th century scholar Abu Ja'far an-Nahaas and 16th century Islamic scholar Al-Suyuti both found only 20 cases of abrogation.
- Az-Zarqaani concludes that only 12 cases of abrogation have occurred.
- The 18th century Muslim scholar Shah Wali Allah, have suggested that just five instances of abrogation exist in the Quran.
- The 19th century Islamic scholar Sayyid Ahmad Khan stated that "no verse of the Quran is abrogated". While himself disagreeing with them by citing the works of modern Egyptian scholars that claim that there is no Naskh at all in the Quran and that the Naskh verse came within a specific occasion, that being the changing of the Qibla, concluding that the theory grew out of desire of the Ulama to establish Fiqh rulings which they otherwise would not have been able to pass.

As mentioned above, one reason for the difference in tallies of abrogated verses comes from a confusion over the difference between "naskh" (abrogation) and "takhsees" (clarification). (An example being verse Q.8:1 which says the "spoils are for Allah and His Messenger", whereas Q.8:41 says "one-fifth is for Allah and His Messenger". While many scholars declared that verse Q.8:41 cancels (naskh) Q.8:1, it might be more accurate to say, Q.8:41 explains (takhsees) how much of the spoils of Q.8:1 "are for Allah and His Messenger".)

Yasir Qadhi declares that calling "takhsees" verses "naskh" inflated the number of naskh verses. Similarly, Ibn Al-Qayyim and Abu Amina Elias argue that what early Muslims called abrogating is now considered interpretation:

The general meaning of the righteous predecessors when using the words 'abrogating' and 'abrogated' is sometimes the complete removal of the previous ruling – and this is the technical term of the latter generations – or sometimes the removal of the general, absolute, and outward meaning, whether by specification, restriction, interpreting an absolute as limited, or by explanation and clarification. Even they would refer to is as exceptional and conditional.

== Scholarly questions and alternatives ==
=== Questions/criticism ===
==== Muslim ====
While belief in the theory of naskh of Islamic revelation is part of Sunni Muslim orthodoxy, there are more than a few scholars who do not accept it, including most twentieth century modernist reformist scholars. In addition some non-mainstream sects of Islam — such as the Mu'tazili, Zaidiyah, and Quranists, and more recently the Ahmadiyya — have rejected naskh on the rationalist grounds that the word of God can not contain contradictions. Other scholars did/do not dismiss the theory of naskh but consider it poor scholarship.

One medieval scholar we know about — Abu Muslim al-Isfahani (d. 322/933) — "denied the theory of naskh entirely". More recently there have been Aslam Jairajpuri (d. 1955), and Modernist Syed Ahmad Khan (d. 1439/1898), revivalist scholar Mohammed al-Ghazali, Khaleel Mohammed, and contemporary scholar Ahmad Hasan.

According to David Powers, Islamic scholars have asked how an eternal, all-knowing, all-powerful God, would need to change His mind, i.e. His eternal divine will, and would reveal rulings wrong or imperfect in the first place. Islamic Modernist scholars, (according to scholar Karel Steenbrink), consider the theory of naskh "an insult to the integrity and value of the uncreated revelation of God." Hasan believes the theory of abrogation of the Quran contradicts its "eternal validity". Mohammed al-Ghazali quotes "jurist and historian", al-Khidri, as "categorically rejected" naskh of Quranic verses, saying abrogation "does not occur except to make specific, or limit, or explain that which is otherwise general and unconditional." Mohammed al-Ghazali also quotes Rashid Rida as quoting the first part of Q.2:106 — "We do not abrogate (naskh) a sign or cause it to be forgotten" — in his opposition to naskh. Syed Ahmad Khan "vehemently" rejected abrogation of Islamic revelation.

Some Muslim scholars (Al-Sha`rani and Shah Wali Allah) were skeptical of the use of Naskh, considering it a sort of short cut to be avoided. According to contemporary scholar Jonathan A.C. Brown, the Sufi jurist Al-Sha`rani considered claims of abrogation to be

the recourse of those mediocre and narrow-minded jurists whose hearts God had not illuminated with his Light. They could not perceive all the interpretive possibilities in the words of God and the Prophet … By taking the shortcut of stamping Quranic verses or Hadiths 'abrogated', such ulama had restricted the interpretive plurality that God had intended in the Shariah. For Sha'rani only when a Hadith included the Prophet's own clear abrogation, like his report about visiting graves, could it be considered Naskh.

Shah Wali Allah was similarly skeptical of the ulama's excessive indulgence in abrogation to explain the relationship between Quranic verses or hadiths. In all but five cases, he found explanations for how to understand the relationship between scriptural passages without recourse to abrogation.

Although not a denier of naskh, Abdul-Rahim notes that

not only were the early Muslims unable to agree on every alleged instance of naskh, they also could not agree on the details of the alleged instances, the number of instances; and the classification of the instances.

Among the arguments Islamic Modernist mufti Muhammad Abduh offers against naskh of the Quran (mentioned earlier) is that "the Quran nowhere announced that verse so-and-so is naskh, or that verse such-and-such is Mansukh". Nor is Naskh an article of faith of Islam, like belief in the prophets, angels, books of Allah. It is "merely a technique employed by the exegetes of the first century."

Since an abrogating verse must have been revealed after an abrogated verse, being able to determined which verse came first is crucial, but (according to Abduh) scholars do not

"possess an undeniable indication that one verse is earlier or later than any other verse, ... They merely asserted without proof that one verse was later than another. ... even more surprising is the absence of a single agreed hadith from the Prophet which might be taken to be a certain documentary proof that verse so-and-so is the nasikh of verse so-and-so."

This raises the question of whether human scholars deciding what had been abrogating are not introducing a "man-made" element into divine revelation.

==== Non-Muslim ====
John Burton argues that the theory of naskh was an "invention of fiqh scholars", used not to develop fiqh but to validated already existing fiqh doctrine. (Note: For example, Burton writes, "Where the Fiqh points to practice different from that adumbrated in the Quran, Tabari [an influential Islamic scholar and exegete of the Qur'an who died about 300 years after Muhammad] can and does conclude that the Quran ruling has been abandoned. His certainty cannot be shaken by the consideration that the corresponding Quran wording has not been abandoned. The decisive criterion for Tabari, as it had been for Shafi'i, is the Fiqh.") (Burton is among those in the "mainstream" of the Islamic studies field of fiqh/Islamic law led by Ignác Goldziher and Joseph Schacht who hold that fiqh doctrine did not grow directly and organically from the Quran and sayings and doings of Muhammad but was already established and sometimes in contradiction with the Quran when the theory of naskh was established.)

A "careful examination of the Quran itself produces no evidence that naskh of the sort fiqh scholars had in mind is envisioned in or exemplified by the Quran." This sort of naskh would be the "classical" form of abrogation, namely abrogation of rulings but not text as (1. naskh al-hukm dūna al-tilāwa). But if this was the case, would not Q.2:106 read:

- "Whatever existing ritual or legal regulation We suppress or cause to abandon, We shall bring in its place another superior to it or at least similar to it... "

... instead of what it does say:

- "What We abrogate (of) a sign or [We] cause it to be forgotten, We bring better than it or similar (to) it."

Furthermore, Burton argues (according to Bernard Weiss) that rather than fiqh scholars deciding which of two (or more) conflicting verses should be the basis of a ruling in Islamic law by determining which verse came later, the scholars searched for "text that supported" an already established doctrine of Islamic law and then postulating "a chronology" whereby that supportive text came "later and the non-supportive text earlier".

==== Defense ====
The principle of naskh is acknowledged by both Sunnis and Shī'a, and the vast majority of their scholars accept that there are significant contradictions within the Quran, within the Hadiths, between the Quran and the Hadiths, and that the doctrine of abrogation as revealed by the Quran is necessary to establish Sharia.

Scholar Roslan Abdul-Rahim defends the concept of naskh pointed out the numerous Islamic scholars who have studied and written on the subject and how "very elaborate, sophisticated and ... complex" scholarly discussion of naskh became. "Over seventy" scholars — both classical and contemporary — have written "solely on naskh". Critics have noted the lack of consensus on what verses or Quran and hadith are abrogated, but Abdul-Rahim replies that while "the Muslim scholars of antiquity" may have disagreed about what revelations of the Qur'an were abrogated, at "the conceptual level of definition" they agreed.

He asks rhetorically "How could a long tradition established by a community bounded by faith and integrity, and supported by continuity and sustainability be so wrong? ... Could they have not understood or simply misunderstood something that is naturally ingrained in the language of their own culture?" While it is true that scholars have not been able to agree on the instances, number, details or classification of naskh, this is no reason to conclude that naskh "as a theory and a phenomenon is false" and he quotes philosopher of science Thomas Kuhn: "failure to achieve a solution discredits only the scientist and not the theory".

Some orthodox scholars, such as Ibn Hilal al-Nahwi found the theory so crucial to Islamic belief that they declared takfir against those who opposed it. Eleventh century scholar Ibn Hilal al-Nahwi (mentioned above) declared that "whoever says" that there is no abrogation in Islam "is not a believer, but rather a kafir," and "must renounce his position or be killed".

More recently, Abd al-Aziz ibn Baz (Wahhabi scholar and Grand Mufti of the Kingdom of Saudi Arabia at the time), responded to an article which included some ideas against the concept of abrogation, by stating that the author was guilty of

"an act of clear disbelief, a repudiation of Islam, and denial of Allah the Glorious and His Prophet on whom be peace ... It is obligatory upon the governing authority to have that man brought to the courts and ask that he retract his statements, and to rule upon him according to that which the pure Shari'ah summons".

(Ibn Baz having called for the execution of Muslims guilty of what he considered acts of unbelief on other occasions.)

=== Alternative Theories ===
Among those who deny the orthodox theory of Naskh out of concerns over how God would change his eternal will, some Islamic scholars have used rationalization and reinterpretation to deal with contradictory verses. In addition, theories have been developed as to how to deal with contradictions in the Quran and/or Sunnah, and what Q.2:106 ("None of Our revelations do We abrogate or cause it to be forgotten, but We substitute something better or similar ...") is referring to if not orthodox naskh of the Quran.

Naskh as abrogation of Jewish and Christian texts

As mentioned above, the idea that Islamic revelation abrogates earlier Jewish and Christian religious laws handed down by monotheist messengers before Muhammad, is widely accepted among Muslims. However, an argument advanced by (at least some of) the minority of scholars who oppose the idea of abrogation of the Quran is that naskh in Q.2:106 refers to only to "the abrogation of the codes of law revealed to the earlier Prophets", and not to abrogation of the Quran. John Burton, Muhammad al-Ghazali, Ahmad Hasan argue that the abrogation verse Q.2:106 was revealed after a series of verses talking about the People of the Book.

Burton notes that the verses, among other things, abrogated many aspects of the Jewish Halakha. According to Muhammad Sameel 'Abd al-Haqq, there are "many" commentators and other scholars who believe that in ayah Q.2:106 ("None of Our revelations do We abrogate or cause it to be forgotten, but We substitute something better or similar ...") the phrase "Our revelations" refers to the revelations before the Qur'an; "something better or similar" refers to the Quran itself. According to Mohammed al-Ghazali, "The revelation of the Qur'an, ... is an abrogation of some of the legislation of the People of the Scriptures (Jews and Christians). ... There is no contradiction in the Qur'an whatsoever ..."

Ahmad Hasan writes: "If we read this passage (Q.2:106) with reference to its context, there remains no doubt that the Qur'an is speaking about the annulment of the Law revealed unto the Prophets of the Children of Israel". As to why "some of the most eminent authorities of tafsir" have not agreed with this explanation, he argues it is because

1. the Arabic word that is translated as "revelation" in verses Q.2:106 and Q.16:101 (ayah) is also the word used "in common parlance" to refer to the verses that make up the surahs of the Quran.
2. the word used to describe the Quran, the Jewish Torah or the Christian New Testament in the Quran is kitab (literally "book").

However, to believe Q.2:106 and Q.16:101 are referring to verses in the Quran, Hasan says,

is an error. Ayah literally means 'a sign', token, or mark by which a person or thing is known and is synonymous with `alamah. It, by implication, also means 'a message, or communication sent from one person or party to another' and is in this sense synonymous with risalah.

==== Resolving contradictions without chronology ====
Two theories have been proposed to deal with contradictory commands of revelation without the chronology of verses and the abrogation of earlier ayat in favor of later ones:

Abrogation of (later) Medinan verses, not earlier ones

The Quran has been divided by scholars into those verses revealed while Muhammad was in Mecca (the Meccan surah) preaching to develop a following, and those revealed after he left Mecca to govern the city of Medina (the Medinan surah). Sudanese Islamic scholar Mahmoud Mohammed Taha has advanced the idea that the Meccan surah contain "the basic and pure doctrine of Islam", and should form the "basis of the legislation" for modern society. These Meccan verses give more prominence to the position of women and praise other prophets and their communities — i.e. Jews and Christians. Taha argues that the Medinan surah, though revealed later in the mission of Muhammad, are not corrections of Meccan revelations but contain specialized commands/doctrine, "compromises" for the political climate, which while appropriate for their time are not eternal and are not necessarily appropriate for the 20th or 21st century.

Replace abrogation with application of commands according to circumstances

Ahmad Hasan argues that since the Quran is valid for eternity, the solution to any contradictions found within it is not to abrogate earlier verses, but to recognize that Qur'anic revelations varied to keep "pace with the changing conditions and environment" and must be studied and applied to their "historical context". In the case of the Meccan surahs that ask "Muslims to be patient and to tolerate the aggression of the infidels" (for example: Q.2:109; Q.6:106; Q10:109; Q15:85; Q29:46), and which conflict with the Medinan Sword Verse (Q.9:5) that calls on Muslims to attack "the infidels and kill them wherever they are found"; neither is a pure/basic doctrine, nor a temporary tactic. The Meccan surahs were revealed when the Muslims were/are weak and could not retaliate against aggression, Medinan surahs when Muslim were/are strong. The proper command to implement is the one for "conditions similar to those in which they were revealed" — apply the Sword Verse when Muslims are strong, the earlier verses when they are not. Mohammed al-Ghazali also states, "There is no contradiction in the Qur'an whatsoever, for every verse has a context within which it functions. ... He, the Legislator who knows the conditions in which the verses may be applied, and it is in this manner that the Qur'anic verses are to be considered in light of the state of human affairs — with wisdom and exhortation."

In their rejection of the theory of naskh the Ahmadiyya also argue that a ruling is considered valid not because it was revealed after any other on a given subject, but because it is most suited to the situation at hand. Ahmadiyya believe all Qur'anic verses have equal validity, in keeping with their emphasis on the "unsurpassable beauty and unquestionable validity of the Qur'ān", but in Ahmadī fiqh rulings apply to the specific situation for which a verse/hadith was revealed

== Literature ==
In addition to being discussed within general works of jurisprudence, naskh generated its own corpus of specialized legal manuals. These treatises invariably begin with an introduction designed to impress the importance and high Islamic credibility of the science, often by an appeal to 'ilmic authority figures of the past (as in the story of 'Alī and the Kufan preacher). As is made clear in these stories, "none may occupy judicial or religious office in the community who is not equipped with this indispensable knowledge and who is incapable of distinguishing nāsikh [abrogator] from mansūkh [abrogatee].

The remainder of the introduction then typically treats the various modes of naskh, naskh's applicability between Sunnah and Qur'ān, and- in appeasement of theological scruples- why naskh is not the same as badā', or inconstancy of the Divine Will. Following this comes the core of the treatise, an enumeration of abrogated verses in sūra order of the Qur'ān. In their consideration of nāsikh wal-mansūkh the taxonomic predilections of these authors comes out, evinced in their discussions of special verses considered "marvels" (ajā'ib) of the Qur'an, such as the verse which abrogates the greatest number of other verses (Q.9:5), the verse which was in effect longest until it was abrogated (Q.46:9), and the verse which contains both an abrogatee and its abrogator (Q.5:105).

=== Works ===
The following is a list of classical examples of the genre:

- "al-Zuhrī", Naskh al-Qur-ān
- Abū 'Ubaid al-Qāsim b. Sallām (d. 838), Kitāb al-nāsikh wal-mansūkh (Book of the Abrogating and Abrogated [Verses])
- al-Nahhās (d. 949), Kitāb al-nāsikh wal-mansūkh
- Hibat Allāh ibn Salāma (d. 1019), Kitāb al-nāsikh wal-mansūkh
- al-Baghādī (d. 1037), al-Nāsikh wal-mansūkh
- Makkī b. Abū Tālib al-Qaisī (d. 1045) al-Īdāh li-nāsikh al-Qur'ān wa-mansūkhihi
- Ibn al-'Atā'iqī (d. 1308), al-Nāsikh wal-mansūkh
- Ibn Hkuzayma al-Fārisī, Kitāb al-mujāz fī'l-nāsikh wa'l-mansūkh
- Ibn Al-Jawzī, Nawāsikh al-Qur-ān
- Jalāl-ud-Dīn al-Suyūţi, Al-Itqān fi Ulūm al-Qur-ān

Modern examples include:

- Ahmad Shah Waliullah Dehlvi, Al-Fawz al-Kabir
- Mustafā Zayd, Al-Naskh fil-Qur'ān al-Karim, Cairo: Dār al-Fikr al-'Arabī, 1963
- Ali Hasan Al-Arīď, Fatħ al-Mannān fi naskh al-Qur-ān
- Abd al-Mutaāl al-Jabri, Al-Nāsikh wal-Mansūkh bayn al-Ithbāt wal-Nafy, Cairo: Wahba Bookstore, 1987
- Mustafa Ibrahīm al-Zalmi, Al-Tibyān liraf` Ghumūď al-Naskh fi al-Qur-ān, Arbīl: National Library, Iraq, 2000
- Ihāb Hasan Abduh, Istiħālat Wujūd al-Naskh fi al-Qurān, Cairo: Al-Nāfitha Bookstore, 2005

== See also ==
- Bada'
- Tafsir
  - Asbab al-nuzul
- Fiqh
  - Usul al-fiqh
- Muhammad ibn Idris ash-Shafi`i
- Progressive revelation (Christianity)
- Retcon
