= Mohammed al-Ghazali =

Egyptian Islamic scholar (1917–1996)

Sheikh Mohammed al-Ghazali الشيخ محمد الغزالي ORE

Personal life
- Born: September 22, 1917 al-Buhayrah, Egypt
- Died: March 9, 1996 (aged 78)

Religious life
- Religion: Islam
- Denomination: Sunni
- Jurisprudence: Hanafi
- Creed: Ashari
- Movement: Modernism

Sheikh Mohammed al-Ghazali al-Saqqa (22 September 1917 – 9 March 1996) (Arabic: الشيخ محمد الغزالي السقا) was an Islamic scholar whose writings "have influenced generations of Egyptians". The author of 94 books, he attracted a broad following with works that sought to interpret Islam and its holy book, the Qur'an, in a modern light. He is widely credited with contributing to a revival of Islamic faith in Egypt in recent times, and has been called (by Gilles Kepel) "one of the most revered sheikhs in the Muslim world".

== Early life ==
Al-Ghazali was born in 1917 in the small town of Nikla al-'Inab (نكلا العنب), southeast of the coastal part of Alexandria, in the Beheira Governorate. He graduated from Al Azhar University in 1941. He taught at the University of Umm al-Qura in Makkah, the University of Qatar, and at al-Amir 'Abd al-Qadir University for Islamic Sciences in Algeria.

== Views and public image ==
Al-Ghazali was perhaps best known in the West for testifying on behalf of the assassins of secularist author Farag Foda, telling the Egyptian court that anyone who openly resisted the full imposition of Islamic law was an apostate who should be killed either by the government or by devout individuals. He also called on the Egyptian government to appoint a committee to measure the faith of the population and give wayward Egyptian Muslims time to repent; he further stated that those who did not should be killed.

In the Muslim world, however, Al-Ghazali was not closely identified with the militant cause. He often appeared on state-run television and held a place in the pulpit of one of Cairo's largest mosques, and, in 1989, wrote a book severely criticizing what he believed to be the "literalism, anti-rationalism, and anti-interpretive approach to Islamic texts" of Ahl al-Hadith, (a term thought to be a euphemism for Wahhabis). The book prompted criticism from several major conferences in Egypt and Saudi Arabia, long articles in response in the Saudi-owned London-based newspaper Asharq Al-Awsat, and assorted writings condemning al-Ghazali and questioning his motives and competence.

After Egyptian Islamic Jihad attempted to kill Egyptian President Hosni Mubarak during a visit to Ethiopia June 1995, al-Ghazali was one of several prominent Islamic clerics who traveled to the presidential palace to congratulate Mr. Mubarak on his safe return.

== Personal life and death ==
Al-Ghazali was married to Lady Amina Kouta, with whom he had seven children, including two boys and five girls. Al-Ghazali was buried in Medina, Saudi Arabia. He was a popular Sheikh in Egypt and remained so after his death.

== Works and awards ==
Al-Ghazali held the post of chairman of the Academic Council of the International Institute of Islamic Thought in Cairo. He authored more than sixty books, many of which have been translated into various languages.

Al-Ghazali was also the recipient of many awards, including the First Order of the Republic (Egypt) (1988), the King Faisal Award (1989) and the Excellence Award from Pakistan.

=== Works ===
Some of Al-Ghazali’s works include:

- Islam and the Modern Economy
- Islam and Political Despotism
- An encyclopedic work called "Fanaticism and Tolerance Between Christianity and Islam"
- Fiqh Al Seerah
- Tafsir on the Qur'an
- Laisa Minal Islam (Not From Islam)
- Our Intellectual Heritage
- Renew Your Life
- Islam and Women's Issues
- The Prophetic Sunna: Between the Jurists and the Hadith Scholars (al-Sunna al-nabawiyya bayna ahl al-fiqh wa ahl al-hadith (Cairo, 1989, 2nd edn. 1990))

=== The Prophetic Sunna ===
Al-Ghazali's work The Prophetic Sunna, was an immediate focus of attention and controversy when it was published in 1989. It became a best seller, with five impressions made by the publisher in its first five months and a second enlarged edition within a year. Within two years, at least seven monographs were published in response to the book. The al-Ahram newspaper compared it to Perestroika restructuring going on in the Soviet Union at that time.

In addition to practical concerns of revivalists—sharia position on economics and taxation, criminal law, the veiling of women, and their place in society and the economy—al-Ghazali wrote about how to purify sunnah of adulterations. Rather than upending the science of hadith criticism, he sought to redress imbalances in scholars' understanding of it.

Nonetheless, the book's criticism of what Al-Ghazali believed to be the "literalism, and anti-interpretive approach to Islamic texts" of the Ahl al-Hadith (partisans of hadith) prompted sharp attacks from Islamists even more conservative than al-Ghazali. Several major conferences in Egypt and Saudi Arabia criticizing the book, long articles in response in the Saudi-owned London-based newspaper Asharq Al-Awsat, and assorted writings of others condemning al-Ghazali and questioning "his motives and competence." According to one of his students — Khaled Abou El Fadl — Al-Ghazali was stunned, and disheartened by what he thought was a smear campaign against him and by the silence of his old students.

== See also ==
- Farag Foda
- Muhammad Metwalli al-Sha'rawi
- Mustafa Mahmoud
