= Reuven Firestone =

American historian of religion (b.1952)

- Born: 27 January 1952 (age 74); Santa Rosa, California

Academic background
- Education: Antioch College; Hebrew Union College-Jewish Institute of Religion; New York University

Reuven Firestone is an American academic and historian of religion, who serves as the Regenstein Professor in Medieval Judaism and Islam at the Hebrew Union College-Jewish Institute of Religion's Skirball Campus in Los Angeles and Affiliate Professor of Religion at the University of Southern California.

== Biography ==
Firestone was born in Northern California and has lived with his family in Israel, Egypt, and Germany. He regularly lectures in universities and religious centers throughout the United States, Europe, the Middle East, and Asia. He has initiated and continues to be involved in numerous projects and initiatives which bring together Jews, Muslims, and Christians, Jews and Arabs, and Israelis and Palestinians.

Firestone earned his B.A. at Antioch College, his M.A. and Rabbinic ordination from the Hebrew Union College-Jewish Institute of Religion in 1982, and was awarded his Ph.D. in Arabic and Islamic studies from New York University in 1988. His scholarship focuses on Jewish studies, the Hebrew Bible and its exegesis, the Quran and its exegesis, Islamic–Jewish relations, religious phenomenology, comparative religion, and interfaith dialogue. He has researched and written extensively on the topics of religious violence and holy war in Islam and Judaism.

He is currently recipient of the Alexander von Humboldt Research Fellowship in Berlin and Sigi Feigel Visiting Professorship for Jewish Studies at the University of Zürich. He served as vice president of the Association for Jewish Studies (AJS) and president of the International Qur’anic Studies Association (IQSA).

== Publications ==
- Firestone, Reuven (March 1989). "Abraham's Son as the Intended Sacrifice (Al-Dhabīh, Qur'ān 37: 99–113): Issues in Qur'ānic Exegesis". Journal of Semitic Studies. XXXIV (1). Oxford: Oxford University Press: 95–131. doi:10.1093/jss/XXXIV.1.95. ISSN 1477-8556. OCLC 29943768. S2CID 170966640.
- Firestone, Reuven (April 1990). "The Problem of Sarah's Identity in Islamic Exegetical Tradition". The Muslim World. 80 (2). Chichester, West Sussex: Wiley-Blackwell: 65–71. doi:10.1111/J.1478-1913.1990.TB03485.X. S2CID 170666826.
- Firestone, Reuven (1990). Journeys in Holy Lands: The Evolution of the Abraham-Ishmael Legends in Islamic Exegesis. Albany, New York: SUNY Press. ISBN 978-0-7914-0331-0.
- Firestone, Reuven (Autumn 1991). "Difficulties in Keeping a Beautiful Wife: The Legend of Abraham and Sarah in Jewish and Islamic Tradition". Journal of Jewish Studies. 42 (2). Oxford: Oxford University Press: 196–214. doi:10.18647/1603/JJS-1991. S2CID 163970126.
- Firestone, Reuven (1991). "Abraham's Association with the Meccan Sanctuary and the Pilgrimage in the Pre-Islamic and Early Islamic Periods". Le Muséon. 104 (3–4). Leuven: Peeters Publishers: 359–387. doi:10.2143/MUS.104.3.2006078. S2CID 162364711.
- Firestone, Reuven (1992). "Abraham's Journey to Mecca in Islamic Exegesis: A Form-Critical Study of a Tradition". Studia Islamica. 76 (76). Leiden: Brill Publishers: 5–24. doi:10.2307/1595657. JSTOR 1595657. S2CID 170412657.
- Firestone, Reuven (January–April 1993). "Prophethood, Marriageable Consanguinity, and Text: The Problem of Abraham and Sarah's Kinship Relationship and the Response of Jewish and Islamic Exegesis". The Jewish Quarterly Review. 83 (3/4). Philadelphia: University of Pennsylvania Press: 331–347. doi:10.2307/1455157. JSTOR 1455157. S2CID 163356620.
- Firestone, Reuven (1997). "Disparity and Resolution in the Qurʾānic Teachings on War: A Reevaluation of a Traditional Problem". Journal of Near Eastern Studies. 56 (1). Chicago: University of Chicago Press: 1–19. doi:10.1086/468496. S2CID 162349235.
- Firestone, Reuven (Spring 1998). "Merit, Mimesis, and Martyrdom: Aspects of Shi'ite Meta-historical Exegesis on Abraham's Sacrifice in Light of Jewish, Christian, and Sunni Muslim Tradition". Journal of the American Academy of Religion. 66 (1). Oxford University Press on behalf of the American Academy of Religion: 93–116. doi:10.1093/JAAREL/66.1.93. S2CID 170698117.
- Firestone, Reuven (November 1998). "International Relations and Politics". The Annals of the American Academy of Political and Social Science. 560. SAGE Journals: 203. doi:10.1177/0002716298560001019. S2CID 220838617.
- Firestone, Reuven (1999). Jihad: The Origin of Holy War in Islam (1st ed.). New York: Oxford University Press. doi:10.1093/acprof:oso/9780195154948.001.0001. ISBN 9780195154948. S2CID 193950640.
- Firestone, Reuven (2001). Children of Abraham: An Introduction to Judaism for Muslims. New York: American Jewish Committee in association with KTAV Publishing House. ISBN 0-88125-721-4. LCCN 2001029182.. Translated into Turkish (2004): Yahudiliği Anlamak İbrahim'in / Avraam'ın Çocukları (Istanbul: GÖZLEM GAZETECİLİK BASIN VE YAYIN AŞ). Translated into Arabic (2005): ذرية إبراهيم: مقدمة عن اليهودية للمسلمين, Dhuriyat Ibrahim: Muqaddima `an al-Yahudiyya lil-Muslimin.
- Firestone, Reuven (November 2006). "Holy War in Modern Judaism? "Mitzvah War" and the Problem of the "Three Vows"". Journal of the American Academy of Religion. 74 (4). Oxford University Press on behalf of the American Academy of Religion: 954–982. doi:10.1093/JAAREL/LFL027. S2CID 170557677.
- Firestone, Reuven; Duran, Khalid; Swidler, Leonard (2007). Trialogue: Jews, Christians, Muslims in Dialogue. New London, Connecticut: Twenty-Third Publications. ISBN 978-1-58595-587-9. LCCN 2006920451.
- Firestone, Reuven (2008). "Patriarchy, Primogeniture, and Polemic in the Exegetical Traditions of Judaism and Islam". In Dohrmann, Natalie B.; Stern, David E. (eds.). Jewish Biblical Interpretation and Cultural Exchange: Comparative Exegesis in Context. Jewish Culture and Contexts. Berlin: De Gruyter/University of Pennsylvania Press. pp. 108–123. doi:10.9783/9780812209457.108. ISBN 978-0-8122-0945-7. S2CID 171386241.
- Firestone, Reuven (2008). Who are the Real Chosen People? The Meaning of Chosenness in Judaism, Christianity, and Islam. Woodstock, Vermont: SkyLight Paths Publishing. ISBN 978-1-59473-248-5.
- Firestone, Reuven (2008). An Introduction to Islam for Jews. Philadelphia: Jewish Publication Society. ISBN 978-0-8276-0864-1. LCCN 2007047352. S2CID 163765208.
- Firestone, Reuven; Heft, James L.; Safi, Omid, eds. (2011). Learned Ignorance: Intellectual Humility among Jews, Christians, and Muslims. New York: Oxford University Press. doi:10.1093/acprof:osobl/9780199769308.001.0001. ISBN 9780199769308. S2CID 171197549.
- Firestone, Reuven (2012). Holy War in Judaism: The Fall and Rise of a Controversial Idea. New York: Oxford University Press. doi:10.1093/acprof:oso/9780199860302.001.0001. ISBN 9780199860302. S2CID 160968766.
- Firestone, Reuven (2012). ""Jihadism" as a new religious movement". In Hammer, Olav; Rothstein, Mikael (eds.). The Cambridge Companion to New Religious Movements. Cambridge: Cambridge University Press. pp. 263–285. doi:10.1017/CCOL9780521196505.018. ISBN 978-0-521-19650-5. LCCN 2012015440. S2CID 156374198.
- Firestone, Reuven (2013). "Islamic Clerics: Tradition and Transition". In Homolka, Walter; Schöttler, Heinz-Günther (eds.). Rabbi - Pastor - Priest: Their Roles and Profiles Through the Ages. Studia Judaica. Vol. 64. Berlin: De Gruyter. pp. 257–276. doi:10.1515/9783110266962.257. ISBN 978-3-11-026601-6. S2CID 171199086.
- Firestone, Reuven (2014). "Rituals: Similarities, Influences, and Processes of Differentiation" (PDF). In Meddeb, Abdelwahab; Stora, Benjamin (eds.). A History of Jewish-Muslim Relations: From the Origins to the Present Day. Princeton, New Jersey: De Gruyter/Princeton University Press. pp. 701–712. doi:10.1515/9781400849130-058. ISBN 978-1-4008-4913-0. S2CID 183204097. Archived (PDF) from the original on 28 February 2017.
- Firestone, Reuven (2014). "The Prophet Muhammad in Pre-Modern Jewish Literatures". In Gruber, Christiane J.; Shalem, Avinoam (eds.). The Image of the Prophet between Ideal and Ideology: A Scholarly Investigation. Berlin: De Gruyter. pp. 27–44. doi:10.1515/9783110312546.27. ISBN 978-3-11-031238-6. S2CID 163709699.
- Firestone, Reuven (2015). "Apes and the Sabbath Problem". In Levenson, Alan T.; Schapkow, Carsten; Shepkaru, Shmuel (eds.). The Festschrift Darkhei Noam: The Jews of Arab Lands. Brill's Series in Jewish Studies. Vol. 55. Leiden: Brill Publishers. pp. 26–48. doi:10.1163/9789004304765_004. ISBN 978-90-04-30090-3. S2CID 181338442.
- Firestone, Reuven (2015). "Abraham and Authenticity". In Blidstein, Moshe; Silverstein, Adam J.; Stroumsa, Guy G. (eds.). The Oxford Handbook of the Abrahamic Religions. Oxford: Oxford University Press. pp. 3–21. doi:10.1093/oxfordhb/9780199697762.013.9. ISBN 978-0-19-969776-2. LCCN 2014960132. S2CID 170382297.
- Firestone, Reuven (2015). "War Policies in Judaism as Responses to Power and Powerlessness - Symposium on Religion, War, and Ethics: A Sourcebook of Textual Traditions". Journal of Religion and Violence. 3 (3). Charlottesville, Virginia: Philosophy Documentation Center: 343–355. doi:10.5840/jrv20153323. ISSN 2159-6808. LCCN 2011201815. OCLC 699807153. S2CID 155662312.
- Firestone, Reuven (4 January 2016). "Muslim-Jewish Relations". Oxford Research Encyclopedia of Religion. Oxford: Oxford University Press. doi:10.1093/acrefore/9780199340378.013.17. ISBN 9780199340378. S2CID 163063592. Archived from the original on 3 December 2018.
