= The Holy Qur'an: Text, Translation and Commentary =

English translation of the Qur'an

- Author: Abdullah Yusuf Ali
- Language: English
- Subject: Quran translation
- Genre: Religious
- Published: 1934
- Publication place: Lahore, British India

The Holy Qur'an: Text, Translation and Commentary is an English translation of the Qur'an by the British Indian Abdullah Yusuf Ali (1872–1953) during the British Raj. It has become among the most widely known English translations of the Qur'an, due in part to its prodigious use of footnotes, and its distribution and subsidisation by Saudi Arabian beneficiaries during the late 20th century.

== History ==
Ali began his translation in the 1920s, after he had retired from the Civil Service and settled in the United Kingdom.

The translation was first published in 1934 by Shaik Muhammad Ashraf Publishers of Bakhshi Bazaar, Lahore, Punjab, one of the major Islamic publishing houses still in business today. The original translation was in its third edition at the time of Ali's death:

- Ali, Abdullah Yusuf (1934). The Holy Qur-ān: English Translation & Commentary (With Arabic Text) (1st ed.). Kashmiri Bazar, Lahore: Shaik Muhammad Ashraf.
- Ali, Abdullah Yusuf (1938). The Holy Qur-an: Text, Translation & Commentary (3rd ed.). Kashmiri Bazar, Lahore: Shaik Muhammad Ashraf.

=== Preface to First Edition, Lahore 4 April 1934 ===
Gentle and discerning reader! what I wish to present to you is an English Interpretation, side by side with the Arabic Text. The English shall be, not a mere substitution of one word for another, but the best expression I can give to the fullest meaning which I can understand from the Arabic Text. The rhythm, music, and exalted tone of the original should be reflected in the English interpretation. It may be but a faint reflection, but such beauty and power as my pen can command shall be brought to its service. I want to make English itself an Islamic language, if such a person as I can do it, and I must give you all the accessory aid which I can.

— A. YŪSUF ‘ALĪ, 1934, Page IV, Online Quran Project

=== Preface to Third Edition, 1938 ===
Since I last greeted my readers collectively I have been able to perform the Pilgrimage to the holy city of Mecca and the sacred territory around it and seen with my own eyes the city and territory of Medina, with all the country around and between the holy Cities. I have realised for myself the scenes in which the revelations came which I have humbly sought to interpret. I hope that some glimpses of this experience will have been conveyed to my dear readers.

— A. YŪSUF ‘ALĪ, 1938, Page VII, Online Quran Project

== Saudi sponsorship ==
In 1980, the Saudi religious establishment felt the need for a reliable English translation and exegesis of the Qur'an to be made available for the increasing English language readership across the globe. After researching the various translations in print at the time, four high-level committees under the General Presidency of the Department of Islamic Research chose Yusuf Ali's translation and commentary as the best available for publication. After significant revisions, a large hardback edition was printed in 1985 by the King Fahd Complex for the Printing of the Holy Quran of Saudi Arabia, according to Royal Decree No. 12412. This edition, however, did not credit Yusuf Ali as the translator on the title page. It served briefly as the officially sanctioned English translation of the Saudi religious establishment, until it was replaced by the Salafi Noble Qur'an translation in 1993 upon the latter's arrival in the marketplace.

== Amana editions ==
The translation established its pre-eminent position in the North American market when Amana Publications of Maryland reprinted the original edition in 1977, retitling it as The Meaning of the Holy Qur'an. Originally printed in paperback in two volumes, it was consolidated into a single hardback edition in 1983.

In 1989, Amana introduced a revised "New Fourth Edition" featuring revision of the translation and commentary undertaken with the help of the International Institute of Islamic Thought. The New Revised Amana print is currently in its 11th edition, dated May 2004.

The Islamic Foundation of UK released an 'English Only' hardback edition in 2005, which features both the translation and commentary without the accompanying Arabic text. It is based on the Revised Amana edition with some additional revisions by the Foundation's own editorial staff.

== Reception ==
San Diego assistant professor and member of Homeland Security Master's Program, Khaleel Mohammed, has described the translation as "a polemic against Jews" citing content in its footnotes. In early 2002 the Los Angeles Unified School District ordered the book removed from school libraries.

The academic Ayesha Chaudhry has described the language of the translation as "super snobby British English".
