= Anson (name) =

Anson is a given name and surname of English origin, typically arising as a variation of the name Hanson.

== Surname ==
- Adelbert Anson (1840–1909), Canadian Anglican bishop
- Albert Edward Anson (1879–1936), British actor
- Andy Anson (born 1964/1965), British businessman
- Augustus Anson (1835–1877), British Victoria Cross recipient and politician
- Cap Anson (1852–1922), American baseball player
- Charles H. Anson (1841–1928), American politician and businessman
- Claude Anson (1889–1969), English cricketer
- Edward Anson (1826–1925), British general and colonial governor
- Eric Anson (1892–1969), New Zealand's first specialist anaesthetist
- Frank A. Anson (1844–1909), American politician and businessman
- Fred C. Anson (1933–2024), American electrochemist and academic
- Frederick Anson (1811–1885), Canon, St. George's Chapel at Windsor Castle
- Geoffrey Anson (1922–1977), English cricketer
- George Anson, 1st Baron Anson (1697–1762), British admiral, noted for his circumnavigation of the globe
- George Anson (politician, born 1731) (1731–1789), British politician
- George Anson (British Army officer, born 1769) (1769–1849), British general during the Peninsular War
- George Anson (British Army officer, born 1797) (1797–1857), British Commander-in-Chief, India, during the Indian rebellion of 1857
- George Anson (priest) (1820–1898), British clergy and Archdeacon of Manchester
- George Edward Anson (1812–1849), courtier and British politician, Treasurer of the Household to HRH Prince Albert
- George W. Anson (1847–1920), British actor
- Horatio Saint George Anson (1903–1925), British electrical engineer
- Jack L. Anson (1924–1990), American college interfraternity movement leader
- Jay Anson (1921–1980), American author of The Amityville Horror
- Jennifer Anson (born 1977), Palauan judoka athlete
- John Anson (born 1949), Canadian wrestler
- John W. Anson (1817–1881), British actor
- Mortimer Louis Anson (1901–1968), protein scientist
- Pascal Anson (born 1973), English designer and artist
- Patrick Anson, 5th Earl of Lichfield (1939–2005), British photographer
- Peter Anson (1889–1975), English writer
- Robert Sam Anson (1945–2020), American writer and journalist
- Rupert Anson (1889–1966), English cricketer
- Scott Anson (born 1989), Scottish footballer
- Sir William Anson, 1st Baronet (1772–1847), general in the British Army
- Sir William Anson, 3rd Baronet (1843–1914), English contract lawyer and Liberal Unionist politician
- Talavera Vernon Anson (1809–1895), British naval officer
- Thomas Anson (politician, died 1773) (c. 1695 – 1773), British politician
- Thomas Anson (cricketer) (1818–1899), English clergyman and cricketer
- Thomas Anson, 1st Viscount Anson (1767–1818), British politician and peer

== Given name ==
=== A–J ===
- Anson Allen (1838–1880), American politician
- Anson M. Beard (1874–1929), American football player
- Anson Brown (1800–1840), U.S. Representative from New York
- Anson Wood Burchard (1865–1927), American businessman
- Anson Burlingame (1820–1870), American abolitionist and diplomat
- Anson Call (1810–1890), Mormon pioneer
- Anson Vasco Call II (1855–1944), Wyoming Mormon pioneer
- Anson Cameron (born 1961), Australian author
- Anson Carmody (born 1989), Canadian curler
- Anson Carter (born 1974), Canadian ice hockey player
- Anson Chan (born 1940), Hong Kong politician
- Anson Chan (born 2000), Hong Kong singer
- Anson Chi (fl. 1990s–2010s), convicted pipeline bomber
- Anson Cornell (1890–1975), American college football player and coach
- Anson Dart (1797–1879), Superintendent for Indian Affairs in the Oregon Territory
- Anson Dickinson (1779–1852), American painter of miniature portraits
- Anson Dodge (1834–1918), American-Canadian lumber dealer and political figure
- Anson Dorrance (born 1951), American soccer coach
- Anson Dyer (1876–1962), English director, screenwriter, animator, and actor
- Anson Funderburgh (born 1954), American blues guitar player and bandleader
- Anson Goodyear (1877–1964), American manufacturer, businessman, author, and philanthropist
- Anson Rogers Graves (1842–1931), first Episcopal bishop of the Missionary District of Western Nebraska
- Anson Harrold (1870–1907), American football player and coach
- Anson Henry (born 1979), Canadian sprinter of Jamaican descent
- Anson G. Henry (1804–1865), American physician and politician
- Anson Herrick (1812–1868), U.S. Representative from New York
- Anson Parsons Hotaling (1827–1900), San Francisco merchant and real estate developer
- Anson Hu (born 1983), Chinese singer
- Anson Jones (1798–1858), last President of the Republic of Texas

=== K–Z ===
- Anson F. Keeler (1887–1943), Connecticut State Comptroller
- Anson Kong (born 1992), Hong Kong singer
- Anson Lo (born 1995), Hong Kong singer
- Anson W. Mackay (fl. 1990s–2010s), professor of geography at University College London
- Anson S. Marshall (1822–1874), American attorney and politician
- Anson G. McCook (1835–1917), American military and political figure
- Anson Mills (1834–1924), United States Army officer, surveyor, inventor, and entrepreneur
- Anson Morrill (1803–1887), 24th governor of Maine
- Anson D. Morse (1846–1916), educator, historian, and professor at Amherst College
- Anson Mount (born 1973), American actor
- Anson Paul (born 1988), actor in Indian films
- Anson Green Phelps (1781–1858), American entrepreneur and business man
- Anson W. Pope (1812–1871), Wisconsin State Assembly member
- Anson Rabinbach (1945–2025), American historian of modern Europe
- Anson Rainey (1930–2011), Israeli professor of ancient Near Eastern cultures and Semitic linguistics
- Anson O. Reynolds (fl. 1880s–1920s), builder of the Anson O. Reynolds House in Des Moines, Iowa
- Anson Rood (1827–1898), American businessman, farmer, politician, and Wisconsin pioneer
- Anson P. K. Safford (c. 1830–1891), third Governor of Arizona Territory
- Anson D. Shupe (1948–2015), American sociologist
- Anson Stager (1825–1885), co-founder of Western Union
- Anson Phelps Stokes (disambiguation), various people
- Anson Weeks (1896–1969), American dance band leader
- Anson Williams (born 1949), actor and director
- Anson Wilson (fl. 1830s–1860s), builder of the Anson Wilson House in Eastern Iowa
- Anson S. Wood (1834–1904), American lawyer and politician

== Middle name ==
- Robert Anson Heinlein (1907–1988), American science fiction author

== See also ==
- Anson (disambiguation)
