= John Anson (disambiguation) =

John Anson (1949–2026) was a Canadian professional wrestler.

John Anson may also refer to:

- Sir John Anson, 2nd Baronet of the Anson baronets
- Sir John Anson, 5th Baronet of the Anson baronets
- John W. Anson (1817–1881), British actor

== See also ==
- Anson (disambiguation)
