= William Anson =

William Anson may refer to:

- Sir William Anson, 1st Baronet (1772–1847), general in the British Army
- Sir William Anson, 3rd Baronet (1843–1914), British jurist and Liberal Unionist politician

== See also ==
- Anson (surname)
