= Oriental Institute, Woking =

Former college in England

Oriental Institute
- Other name: Oriental University Institute
- Active: 1884–1899
- Founders: Gottlieb Wilhelm Leitner
- Academic affiliation: University of the Punjab
- Principal: Gottlieb Wilhelm Leitner
- Location: Woking, Surrey, United Kingdom

The Oriental Institute was a British educational institution in Woking, Surrey, established by Gottlieb Wilhelm Leitner. It was also occasionally called the Oriental University Institute.

== History ==
The site of the Royal Dramatic College was purchased by Leitner in the spring of 1884. He immediately went about turning it into his idea of an Oriental Institute, decorating the interior with objects he had collected on his travels. Part of the building was turned into an Oriental Museum, said to have housed the most interesting collection of artefacts from the east in Britain, and it also contained an art collection. The Institute remained relatively obscure locally, with Leitner once remarking that "There is no place in the world where the Institute and its publications are less known than in Surrey." In 1889, the Shah Jahan Mosque was founded, with funding from Sultan Shah Jahan, Begum of Bhopal, as a place for Muslim students of the Institute to worship when they were in Woking.

It was hoped the Institute would achieve full university status, and by the 1890s it was awarding degrees accredited by the University of the Punjab in Lahore. Leitner intended it to be the academic centre for studies in this field - a role which was later taken on by the University of London's School of Oriental and African Studies, founded in 1916. Leitner began publishing six academic journals at the Institute, in Sanskrit, Arabic, English and Urdu. They included Sanskrit Quarterly Review, Al-Haqa’iq: an Arabic Quarterly Review and The Imperial and Asiatic Quarterly Review. In a letter to The Times, G. R. Badenoch described a visit to the Institute, and wrote that he "considered that India is greatly indebted to Dr. Leitner" for the vast collection maintained at the Institute. One professor at the Institute was Francis Joseph Steingass, who taught modern languages.

Leitner fell ill in 1898, and died of pneumonia in 1899. Following his death, his son, Henry, took over the running of the institute, but it closed around a decade later and the vast collection was sold on. Had it succeeded, the project might have had a profound effect upon the town, it is realistic to suppose that by 1914 there would have been an Oriental University at Woking, making the town a cultural centre of importance, and giving it an identity and status that it has tended to lack. But this remained hypothetical, and the Institute is now all but forgotten.

Oriental Road in Woking is named after the institute.

== In literature ==
The Institute is mentioned on a number of occasions, as the 'Oriental College' in the early chapters of The War of the Worlds by H. G. Wells. In the novel the narrator describes seeing the College, and its mosque, wrecked by the Martian heat-ray.

== See also ==
- Shah Jahan Mosque, Woking
