= The Big Painting Challenge =

- Genre: Painting; Reality
- Presented by: Richard Bacon (2015); Una Stubbs (2015); Richard Coles (2017–2018); Mariella Frostrup (2017–2019)
- Judges: Daphne Todd; Lachlan Goudie; David Dibosa (2017)
- Theme music composer: Theo Vidgen
- Country of origin: United Kingdom
- Original language: English
- No. of series: 4
- No. of episodes: 22

Production
- Executive producers: Colm Martin; Claire Nosworthy; Kat Lennox
- Producers: Nick Wilkinson; Sarah Ager
- Production location: Various
- Running time: 60 minutes
- Production company: BBC Studios

Original release
- Network: BBC One
- Release: 22 February 2015 – 25 April 2019

The Big Painting Challenge is a television programme first broadcast on BBC One on 22 February 2015. It is a contest in the style of The Great British Bake Off but with the craft of painting rather than baking.

== Series 1 (2015) ==
Una Stubbs and Richard Bacon hosted this series, in which 10 amateur painters took on three specially designed challenges each week, using a wide range of mediums. Expert judges Daphne Todd and Lachlan Goudie decided who would be leaving each week. The ten contestants were:-

Jan Szymczuk Paul Bell (Winner) Melvyn Flint Amy Goldring Richard Anthea Lay Alison Stafford Claire Parker Anne Blankson Hemans Heather Harding

== Series 2 (2017) ==
Mariella Frostrup and the Rev Richard Coles took over as hosts for series 2. Goudie and Todd were joined by David Dibosa to assess their efforts of the contestants and decide who was eliminated. Diana Ali and Pascal Anson also joined the programme as mentors to the painters.

== Series 3 (2018) ==
Mariella Frostrup and Rev Richard Coles presented the third series, which began with 10 contestants. Each week, the finished art was displayed to members of the public, who voted for their favourite. Judges Goudie and Todd decided which contestant would be eliminated. In week 2, Fraser Scaarfe was a guest judge in Lachlan's absence.

Results summary
Elimination chart
Painter	1	2	3	4	5	6
Oliver						WINNER
Anil						Runner Up
Callum						Runner Up
Chris						Runner Up
Susan					OUT	
Tilly					OUT	
Jane				OUT		
Ray			OUT			
Bokani		OUT				
Surjit	OUT					

Colour key:

Painter got through to the next round.
Painter was eliminated.
Painter was the Public Choice.
Painter was a series runner-up.
Painter was the series winner.

== Series 4 - Celebrity Painting Challenge (2019) ==
Six well known figures - Jane Seymour, Laurence Llewelyn-Bowen, Phil Tufnell, George Shelley, Amber Le Bon and Josie d'Arby - took part in a celebrity version of the contest. Mariella Frostrup was presenter and judges Daphne Todd and Lachlan Goudie returned to critique and review the work. Diana Ali and Pascal Anson returned to mentor the celebrities. Josie D'Arby was crowned the winner in the third episode.

== Transmissions ==
=== Series ===
Series	Start date	End date	Episodes
1	22 February 2015	29 March 2015	6
2	12 February 2017	19 March 2017	6
3	1 April 2018	6 May 2018	6
4	4 April 2019	25 April 2019	4

== Reception ==
Sam Woollaston of The Guardian described the first series as "nothing original" to other tried and tested formats, though it did set out to prove painters weren't all "white, upper-middle-class retirees in smocks and straw hats" and worked much better than other programmes because of its visual subject matter.

In April 2018 The Telegraph reviewer gave 3 out of 5 stars for Series 3.
