= Citadel Arts Centre =

Arts and community centre in St Helens, England

The Citadel Arts Centre, commonly referred to as The Citadel, is an arts and community centre situated in the centre of St Helens in Merseyside, England occupying a Victorian building on the corner of Waterloo Street and Milk Street. The centre opened in 1988 initially as a popular music venue and theatre. After refurbishment in 2000, it continued to offer a large programme of music, theatre and arts based workshops throughout the week. As of 2016, the space was primarily hired by St Helens Council for its adult social care and health activities. It closed in June 2019 and is due to reopen in September 2022.

== History ==
The Citadel, St Helens, Merseyside as it stood after the turn of the century after the Salvation Army procured it

The building was originally constructed in 1861 as a music hall/theatre simply named the 'Theatre Royal'. It replaced an unspecified earlier building on the site. The theatre originally had two balconies and a large stage with a small fly tower. It had capacity for over 1,300 people. The remains of the second balcony can still be seen today. The theatre was popular with touring companies and despite numerous different owners it grew in popularity until the venue was deemed to be unfit for purpose. From April to December 1862 the theatre was run by the actor-manager Samuel Johnson.

In 1887 the manager, a Mr Wallace Revill, purchased and plot of land on Corporation Street in St Helens, and a new theatre was constructed, designed by Frank Matcham. Revill vacated the Milk Street building and took the name 'Theatre Royal' with him. The new Theatre Royal still stands.

The Salvation Army purchased the building in 1889 and began an extensive programme of refurbishments which removed the stage and fly tower, the upper balcony and also the boxes. This was furthered in 1904 when the building was altered even more. It was reopened by Col. Pilkington, of the famous glass manufacturers in June 1905. The building was used by the Salvation Army as their Citadel (from whence its new name came) up until the early 1980s. It was then put up for sale.

== The Citadel ==
From 1991 up until 1999 the venue primarily was a rock, blues and jazz venue and saw bands in their infancy such as The Stone Roses, The La's, The Verve and Cast take to the stage. Since a major refurbishment and restructuring in the year 2000, the organisation has changed considerably. As well as the music programme. In 2002 the venue was voted as one of the top 10 jazz and blues venues in the UK by the newspaper, The Independent.

2008 saw the launch of the St Helens Choir, in coordination with St Helens Council and the Sing Out 08 promotion (part of the Liverpool Capital of Culture operation).

In 2009 The Citadel celebrated its 21st birthday with a special event with invited guests and members of the public. Also in 2009 The Citadel was awarded Big Lottery Young Peoples Fund 2 as part of the National Lottery (United Kingdom)'s ongoing Arts Council investment scheme to run its Music Mecca project.

2010 saw the launch of Music Mecca, a three-year project designed to offer free music workshops to young people across the St Helens area. Music Mecca was one of the featured promotions for St Helens Festival.

== People ==
The Citadel was purchased by entrepreneur Ian Pitts in 2020, and leased for 5 years by MD Creatives.
