= Arrowsmith (film) =

1931 film directed by John Ford

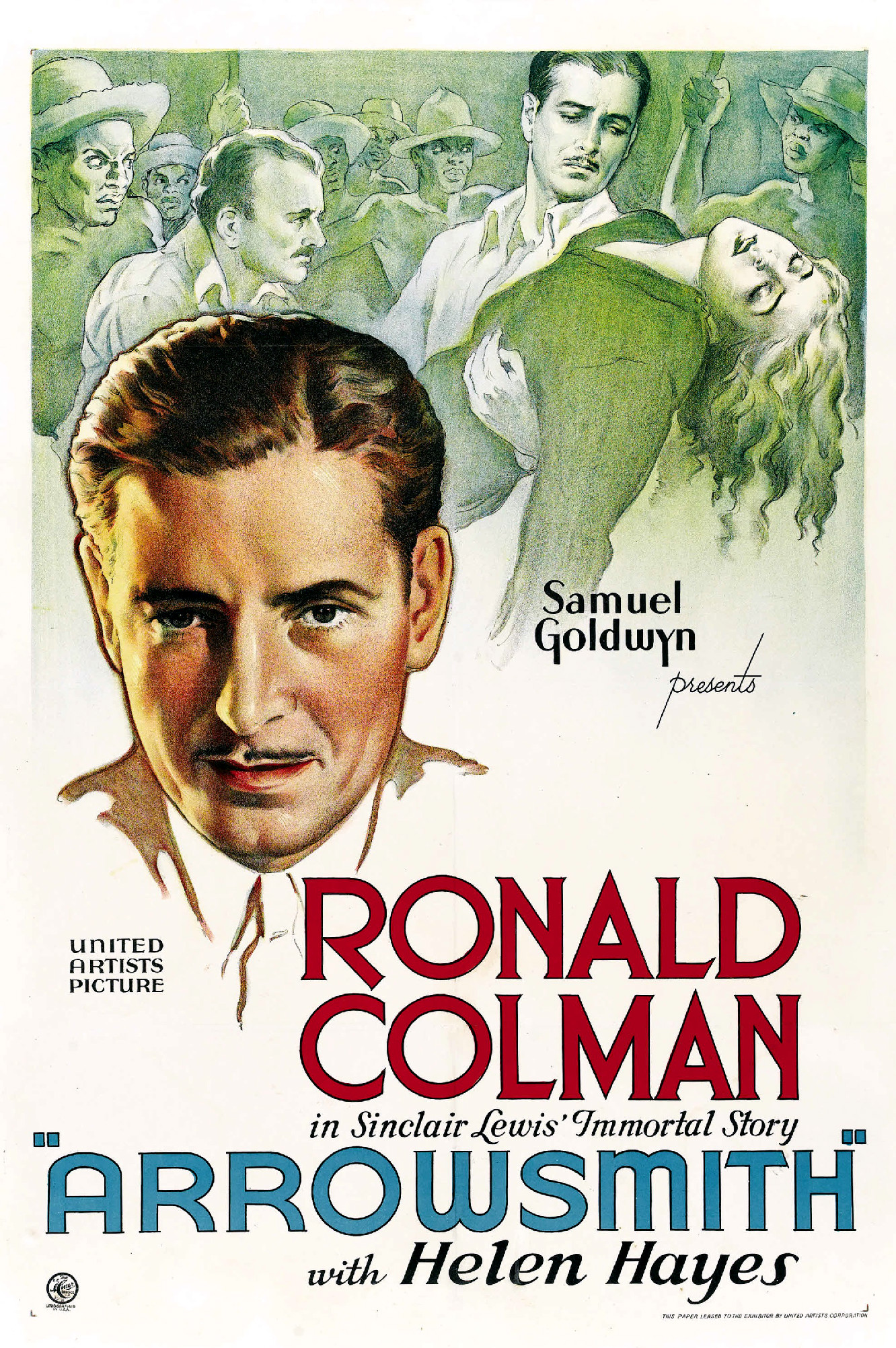
- Theatrical release poster
- Directed by: John Ford
- Written by: Sidney Howard
- Based on: Arrowsmith; 1925 novel by Sinclair Lewis
- Produced by: Samuel Goldwyn
- Starring: Ronald Colman; Helen Hayes; Richard Bennett; Myrna Loy
- Cinematography: Ray June
- Edited by: Hugh Bennett
- Music by: Alfred Newman
- Color process: Black and white
- Production company: Samuel Goldwyn Productions
- Distributed by: United Artists
- Release date: December 7, 1931
- Running time: 108 minutes
- Country: United States
- Language: English
- Box office: $1.25 million

Arrowsmith is a 1931 American pre-Code drama film directed by John Ford and starring Ronald Colman, Helen Hayes, Richard Bennett, and Myrna Loy. It was adapted from Sinclair Lewis's 1925 novel Arrowsmith by Sidney Howard, departing substantially from the book regarding Arrowsmith's womanizing and other key plot elements. The pre-Code film received four Oscar nominations, including the Academy Award for Best Picture, Best Writing, Adaptation (Howard), Best Cinematography (Ray June), and Best Art Direction (Richard Day).

== Plot ==
An idealistic young medical student, Martin Arrowsmith, introduces himself assertively to Dr. Max Gottlieb, a noted bacteriologist. Though Gottlieb deems Arrowsmith not yet ready to study with him, he is impressed by the young man's determination and honest self-appraisal and encourages him to take the standard course of study first. When Arrowsmith graduates, Gottlieb offers him a position as his research assistant, but the young man reluctantly turns him down, having fallen in love with a nurse, Leora. He would be unable to support her on a research assistant's meager salary. He marries, and the couple sets off for Leora's rural home town in South Dakota.

Unhappy with the vicissitudes of his medical practice there, he is drawn by a former client across the boundary into veterinary medicine when the man's cows are dying - even faster when given injections by the local state health official. Determined to find a cure of his own, he carries out scientific research in his kitchen, eventually developing a successful serum. Reinvigorated, he decides to abandon his practice and join Gottlieb as a research scientist at the renowned and extremely well-funded McGurk Institute in New York City. Meanwhile, Leora miscarries and cannot have any more children, so she devotes herself to her husband's career.

After two fallow years at McGurk, Arrowsmith stumbles onto an antibiotic serum that he does not understand (and is unsure how he produced), yet has demonstrated the ability to kill at least one type of germ. He shortly is able to replicate it, and to study its efficacy on other microbes, he is sent to the West Indies, where a virulent outbreak of bubonic plague has arisen. He is coincidentally teamed with a popular Swedish lecturer on "Heroes of Health" he once met while still in South Dakota, Dr. Gustav Sondelius, who is extremely enthusiastic over both the team and the serum's prospects to help cure the disease. Leora accompanies her husband, despite his fear for her safety.

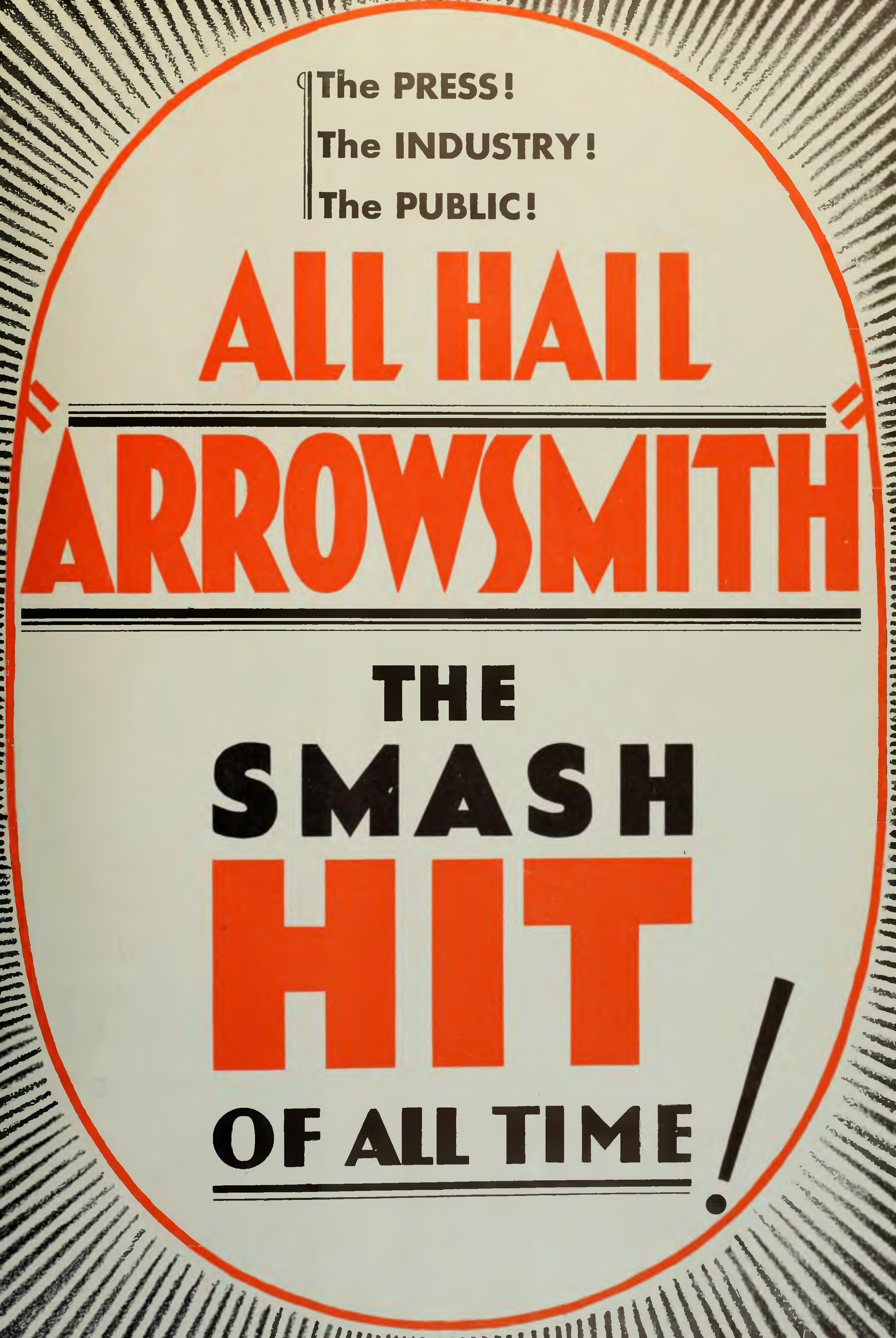
Advertising art from The Film Daily, 1932

Arrowsmith has strict instructions from Gottlieb to employ the scientific method in his efforts, conducting a blind study by administering the serum to one-half his patients and a placebo injection to the other. Upon learning of this, the West Indies governor, Sir Robert Fairland, refuses to allow him to proceed. Seeking to break the impasse, black Dr. Oliver Marchand suggests Arrowsmith conduct his experiment in a backwater community on a neighboring island where the infection is rampant. Arrowsmith agrees, insisting Leora stay behind for her own protection. The study begins. Among those seeking an inoculation of Arrowsmith's serum is Mrs. Joyce Lanyon, a New York socialite stranded on the island. They are attracted to each other, though their subsequent affair is only hinted at obliquely.

Sondelius contracts the disease. In his death throes, he pleads with Arrowsmith to abandon scientific protocol and save as many lives as possible. Concerned about his wife's welfare, Arrowsmith asks Marchand to check on her upon his return to the main island, only to have his colleague die while on the phone before he can give his report. Arrowsmith races home, but Leora is dead. In a drunken delirium, he gives the serum to all, saving the Indies from the plague. Upon his return to New York, he is hailed by the press and feted by McGurk Institute head Dr. Tubbs, who seeks to take advantage of Arrowsmith's glory. Arrowsmith instead rushes directly to Gottlieb.

Desperate to explain his abandonment of research principles and his mentor's specific mandate to advance science rather than practice medicine, Arrowsmith discovers that Gottlieb has had a stroke, is insensible, and near death. Disgusted with all that is transpiring, friend and colleague Terry Wickett, a prominent chemist at the institute, announces abruptly that he is quitting to set up his own "shoestring" laboratory to pursue science. Turning his back on public adulation, a promotion, and a big raise, Arrowsmith resigns to join forces with Wickett. Joyce Lanyon appears, seeking to rekindle their relationship, but he spurns her, committing himself to his career.

== Cast ==
- Ronald Colman as Dr. Martin Arrowsmith
- Helen Hayes as Leora Arrowsmith
- Richard Bennett as Gustav Sondelius
- A.E. Anson as Professor Max Gottlieb
- Clarence Brooks as Oliver Marchand
- Alec B. Francis as Twyford
- Claude King as Dr. Tubbs
- Bert Roach as Bert Tozer
- Myrna Loy as Mrs Joyce Lanyon
- Russell Hopton as Terry Wickett
- David Landau as State Veterinarian
- Lumsden Hare as Sir Robert Fairland – Governor
- Ward Bond as Cop (uncredited)
- John Qualen as Henry Novak (uncredited)

== Production ==
The film is only somewhat faithful to the novel, among other significant changes omitting Arrowsmith's serial womanizing, and completely skipping all mention of Arrowsmith's wealthy, self-centered second wife. Myrna Loy has only a few scenes with Colman, and their relationship is undeveloped to the point of being indecipherable. According to Robert Osborne, host of Turner Classic Movies, Helen Hayes claimed that as filming went on various scenes were dropped from the script without explanation. It is claimed that Samuel Goldwyn had hired director John Ford on condition that he not drink during the production.

== Reception ==
The film was a financial and critical success. It was nominated for four Academy Awards, including for Best Picture, Best Writing, Adaptation (Howard), Best Art Direction (Richard Day) and Best Cinematography (Ray June).
