= Francis Joseph Steingass =

British linguist (1825–1903)

Francis Joseph Steingass (March 16, 1825, Frankfurt am Main – January 1903) was a British linguist and orientalist.

== Biography ==
Steingass completed his education, including a PhD, in Munich, Germany. Later, he was a professor of Modern Languages at Birmingham and a professor of Modern Languages and Resident Lecturer on Arabic Languages, Literature & Law at the Oriental Institute, Woking, Surrey, England.

He mastered 14 languages, including Arabic, Persian and Sanskrit. He published a number of Persian-English, Arabic-English and English-Arabic dictionaries.

== Works ==
=== Author ===
- Steingass (1882). English-Arabic dictionary: for the use of both travellers and students. London: W. H. Allen & Co.. Another digitised copy is here.
- Steingass, F.J. (1884). The student's Arabic-English dictionary. London: Crosby Lockwood and Son.
- Steingass (1892). A Comprehensive Persian-English Dictionary, Including the Arabic words and phrases to be met with in literature. London: Routledge & Kegan Paul.

=== Translator, editor ===
- The Assemblies of Al-Ḥarîri. Translated from the Arabic with Notes Historical and Grammatical (1898), vol. 2 (the last 24 Assemblies), trans. from Arabic by and F. Steingass, preface & index by F. F. Arbuthnot, Oriental Translation Fund, New Series, 3 (London: Royal Asiatic Society), 2nd of 2 vols, the 1st with the first 24 Assemblies being published in 1867 with a trans. by Thomas Chenery.
