= Wilson's School =

Grammar school in Wallington, Greater London, England

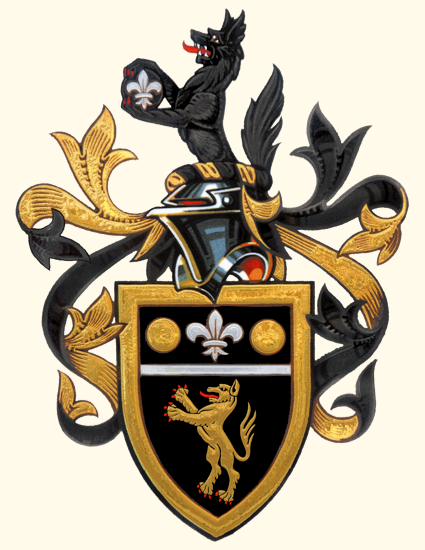

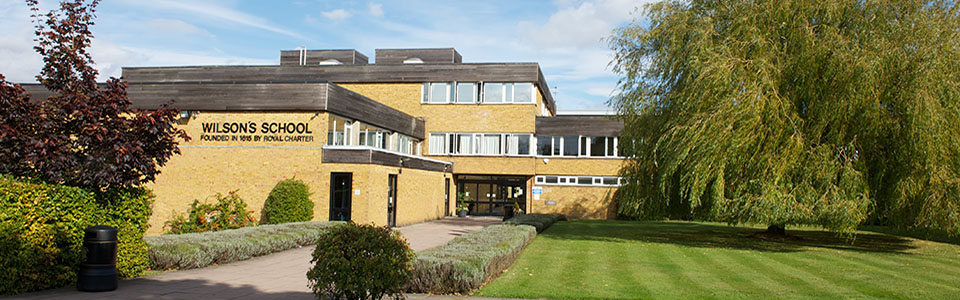
- Main entrance, leading from Mollison Drive

Location
- Mollison Drive; Wallington, Greater London, SM6 9JW; England; 51.3586°N 0.1281°W

Information
- Type: Grammar, academy
- Motto: Non sibi sed omnibus (Not for oneself but for all)
- Established: 1615; 411 years ago
- Founder: Edward Wilson
- Closed: https://en.wikipedia.org/wiki/Talk:Wilson%27s_School
- Department for Education URN: 136621 Tables
- Ofsted: Reports
- Chair of Trust Board: John Nicholson
- Head: Tim Lissimore (Associate Head) Nathan Cole (Executive Head)
- Gender: Boys
- Age: 11 to 18
- Enrollment: 1290
- Houses: Brecon; Camberwell; Datchelor; Greencoat; Hayes; Southwark
- Colours: Black, white and gold
- Alumni: Old Wilsonians
- Website: www.wilsons.school

Wilson's School is a state boys' grammar school with academy status in the London Borough of Sutton, England.

It was founded as Wilson's Grammar School in Camberwell in 1615 by Edward Wilson, making it one of the country's oldest state schools. The school moved to its present location on part of the site of the former Croydon Airport in 1975. It became voluntary aided in 1997 and an Academy in June 2011. In 2015, the school celebrated its 400th anniversary with a visit from Prince Edward.

Academic progress in the school is rated well above the national average, and the school is currently rated outstanding in all categories by Ofsted. The Times and Sunday Times have listed the school as Secondary School of the Year on several occasions.

== History ==
=== Foundation ===
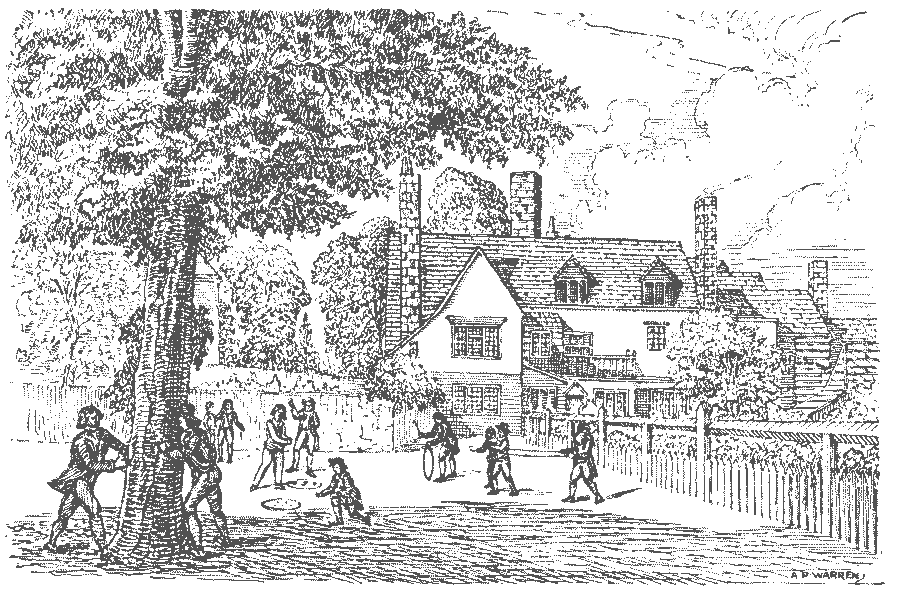
The Old Buildings, showing the West House, as it was rebuilt in 1687, viewed from the south

The school was founded by Edward Wilson in 1615 and was located in Camberwell in Surrey, but now part of Greater London. At that time it was a small village of cottages, homesteads, inns and larger buildings grouped around a village green. Wilson was born around 1550 in Cartmel, Lancashire, which had its own grammar school, from where he passed on to Cambridge University. No record remains of him taking a degree, although it is known that he went into the Church, being appointed Deacon at Ely in Norfolk in 1576. He subsequently became Vicar of the Parish of Camberwell, which was presented to him by Queen Elizabeth I in person. It is thought that this indicated that he favoured the settlement of the Church of England, which the Queen was thought to have been resolved to make. His nephew Peter Danson became a governor of the new school at its founding. Danson was also vicar of Carshalton in Surrey, only one mile from the present site of the school. A further member of the Wilson family, a namesake of Edward Wilson, is named in the charter of the school as the Master.

After his wife died, and having had no children, he decided to set up a school using his available resources to create a legacy- saying in the royal charter that for all time there would be a school in Camberwell named after him. At the time, the establishment of a grammar school in England required the assent of the crown. This was obtained after the first school buildings were constructed. The original charter bearing this assent has since been lost, although in 1929 the governors of the school obtained a certified extract from the Patent Rolls. This requirement for the agreement of the Crown explains the legend "Founded in 1615 by Royal Charter" that appears in various places beneath the school name. The charter was granted by King James I, who had succeeded his cousin Elizabeth by this time.

The charter names the school as "The Free Grammar School of Edward Wilson, clerk, in Camberwell, otherwise Camerwell, in the County of Surrey."

=== Reconstitution ===
In 1845 the school was forced to close as a result of a financial scandal. This was the result of Governor James Goulston, who sued the school. Following an Order in Council of Queen Victoria in 1880, which superseded the previous Royal Charter, the school was rebuilt on a different site in Camberwell, opening in 1883. It again catered to the need for schooling of boys in Camberwell, which was thought to have grown considerably from its rustic origins by this time. Its working population largely consisted of men working in the professions, clerks, journalists, tradesmen and labourers. It was thought that a grammar school provided an asset to the neighbourhood, with the prospect for boys to go on to University education.

For five and a half years during the Second World War, Wilson's was evacuated to a Camp School at Itchingfield near Horsham, Sussex, and for the only period in its history became a boarding school. The whole compound stood around a broad elliptical area, set in large part to grass and the remainder, an asphalt quadrangle. Radiating from this central area, in spoke-like fashion, was a series of large cedarwood huts. These were the dormitories, ablution blocks and classrooms. Two larger buildings stood adjacent to the asphalted space, one the dining hall and the other the assembly hall which also functioned as the gym, cinema and church. The whole establishment catered for four hundred plus boys forming six houses, all named after past headmasters of the school, Nairn, Macdowell, Wilson, Kelly, Whiteley and Jephson. The Head Master of Christ's Hospital allowed Wilson's the use of the school's cricket pitches, swimming bath and other facilities, including the Great Hall for Speech Day.

In 1958, an elementary school in Camberwell known as the Greencoat School was closed after a 250-year history and part of its assets passed to Wilson's Grammar School. The funds were used to provide a new science facility, the Greencoat Building, which was constructed opposite the main school site in Wilson Road. Two carved figures of a boy and a girl which are believed to have stood over the boys' and girls' entrances to the school were installed first in the Greencoat Building, and later in the Greencoat Courtyard in the new school at Wallington.

While information on pupils taught at the school before 1843 has been lost, Wilson's has a long list of noted Old Boys across the fields of entertainment, science, the military and the church. A Short History of Wilson's School, from which much of the information below was taken, was first published in 1951; its most recent edition was in 1987.

=== Relocation ===
In 1975 the school moved to the current site. A three part plan for expansion only saw part one carried out, though subsequent construction has included additional science blocks, the Sixth Form Centre, the Foundation Building, the Venner Building (for Art and Design), the Lower School (to accommodate Year 7 and 8 teaching), and the Britton Centre (for Music).

=== Recognition ===
The school has received a number of accolades:

- In November 2018, The Times' School Guide declared Wilson's the "State Secondary School of the Year".
- Wilson's was awarded "London State Secondary School of the Decade" by The Times in 2020.
- The school was named "Secondary School of the Year" again in 2024 by The Sunday Times newspaper.
- The Sunday Times named Wilson's as "State Secondary School of the Year for GCSEs 2026"

The school's last Ofsted inspection took place in September 2022 and rated the school as "Outstanding" in all categories.

== School Coat of Arms and Badge ==
From 1883 the school was accustomed to use as a coat of arms the version of the Wilson shield used by Edward Wilson, probably without authority. In 1985 the then Chairman of Governors, Lt. Col. W. R. Bowden, obtained a Grant of Arms from the College of Arms. The new officially authorised Arms introduced to the previous form a silver bar between the wolf and the objects above, together with a gold border. Additionally, a crest is added above the helm in the form of a black wolf holding a silver fleur-de-lys in his paws with a black and gold mantle.

== Houses ==
Each pupil is allocated to one of the houses upon entry to the school. In 1981, four new houses (Brecon, Camberwell, Greencoat and Hayes) replaced the previous six (Jephson, Kelly, McDowell, Nairne, Whiteley, Wilson). Southwark was added in 2002, when the school became five form entry. In 2014, the six house structure was restored with the advent of Datchelor. Students in the same year in the same house are in the same form, and have registration, form period and lessons in Years 7 and 8 together. Between Year 9 and 11, forms are split in two each with their own form tutors. From Year 9, students no longer have lessons exclusively with members of their forms. All members of the staff are allocated to Houses. Three of the houses (Brecon, Camberwell and Datchelor) learn German, while the other three houses (Greencoat, Hayes and Southwark) learn French.

== Curriculum ==
In Years 7 and 8, all pupils study a range of subjects including mathematics, English, science, and humanities. In Years 9 to 11, pupils study for GCSE qualifications in a number of subjects, some of which are optional and chosen by the pupil. All students study the EBacc subjects. In the Sixth Form, pupils study four A-level subjects of their choice in Year 12 and at least three in Year 13. The most popular A-level subjects include mathematics and science subjects.

== Sport ==
The school's main sport is association football, in which they have a rivalry with neighbouring Sutton Grammar School.

Rugby union was first introduced to the school in 1886, although it has not been continuously played since then. It was revived in 1921, in the 1960s and 1980s, and has continued since a further revival in the mid-1990s. Rugby teams in all year groups compete against a range of local schools. The teams often participate in sevens tournaments. Wilson's has produced a number of Surrey players and has close contact with local clubs such as Sutton & Epsom and Warlingham.

Since 2019, the school has been included in The Cricketer magazine’s Top 100 Schools for cricket.

During the summer term, the school partakes in track and field events; these include 100 m to 1500 m races, hurdles, javelin, shot put, long jump, high jump, triple jump and discus.

The school was designated an Academy School by Badminton England in February 2006. The school is home for the Chadacre Badminton club.

The under-19s table tennis team was ranked fourth nationally, having won the Surrey Cup and the National Schools Area Tournament, and being runners up in the National Regional Tournament.

== Combined Cadet Force ==
Wilson's School CCF was established in 1910 as an Army Officer Training Corps on the original Camberwell site by a teacher, Captain Edmonds. It is now a Combined Cadet Force with Army and RAF sections, the latter introduced in 1964. The corps is inspected every two years.

== Notable alumni ==
Class lists from 1615 to 1843 have been lost, making it impossible to record with absolute certainty those who rose to fame in that period. However, A Short History notes that James Tyrrell, grandson of Archbishop Usher and author of A General History of England and other works, is known to have been a pupil in the middle of the seventeenth century.

=== Entertainment and sport ===
- Tom Abbott, presenter and commentator for US television network The Golf Channel
- Sir Michael Caine (formerly Maurice Joseph Micklewhite), actor. Caine wrote of his dislike of his time at Wilson's, which was still in Camberwell during that period, in his autobiography What's It All About? However, he also states that his English teacher, Eric Watson "took the trouble to guide my rebellious mind into the area of literature."
- Jack Elliott, professional footballer
- Simon Furman, comic book writer
- Stephen Jenkins, stage name Stephen Beckett, actor with regular roles in Coronation Street and The Bill
- Andrew Kazamia, actor with a regular role in London's Burning, playwright and film-maker
- Andy Scott, professional footballer and manager

=== Arts, humanities and politics ===
- Pascal Anson, artist and designer
- Colin Butts, writer, Is Harry on the Boat? and White Island
- John Galliano, CBE, RDI, fashion designer
- Harry Golombek, OBE, Chess Grandmaster
- Roy Porter, historian
- Sir Norman Reid, former director of the Tate Gallery
- Mark Stone, opera singer
- Matthew Todd, editor of Attitude Magazine and playwright

=== Military ===
- Capt. Harold Auten, VC, DSC, RD, "Q-Ship" commander in the First World War, author of ""Q" Boat Adventures" and later executive Vice-President of the Rank Organisation
- Sir Alan Cobham, KBE, AFC, pioneer aviator (first flight from Britain to Australia in 1926 and pioneer of air-to-air refuelling).

=== Science ===
- Sir Lewis Fermor, OBE DSc FRS
- John Stevens Henslow, botanist and geologist
- Sir James Jeans, OM MA DSc ScD, astronomer
- George Barker Jeffery, mathematician

=== Industry and government ===
- Ernest Partridge, MP and industrialist

=== Church ===
- The Very Revd. Dr Walter Robert Matthews, CH, KCVO, DD, DLitt, former Dean of St Paul's Cathedral

== Governors ==
An exhaustive list is to be found in Appendix A of "A Short History of Wilson's School". The following are particular highlights from this. Dates are of their governorships.

- Hugh Boulter, DD, 1708–1722, Chaplain to George I, Bishop of Bristol, Archbishop of Armagh (Church of Ireland)
- Rev. Dr. George D'Oyly, 1820–1846, theologian, biographer and the main founder of King's College London
- Edmund Gibson, DD, 1703–1717, Bishop of Lincoln and later bishop of London
- George Hooper, DD, 1675–1703, Bishop of St Asaph, later bishop of Bath and Wells. Chaplain to Charles II and Regius Professor of Divinity at Oxford University
- William Dalrymple Maclagan, 1869–1875, Rector of Newington and later Archbishop of York, author of hymns
