= Royal Dramatic College =

Former retirement home for actors in England

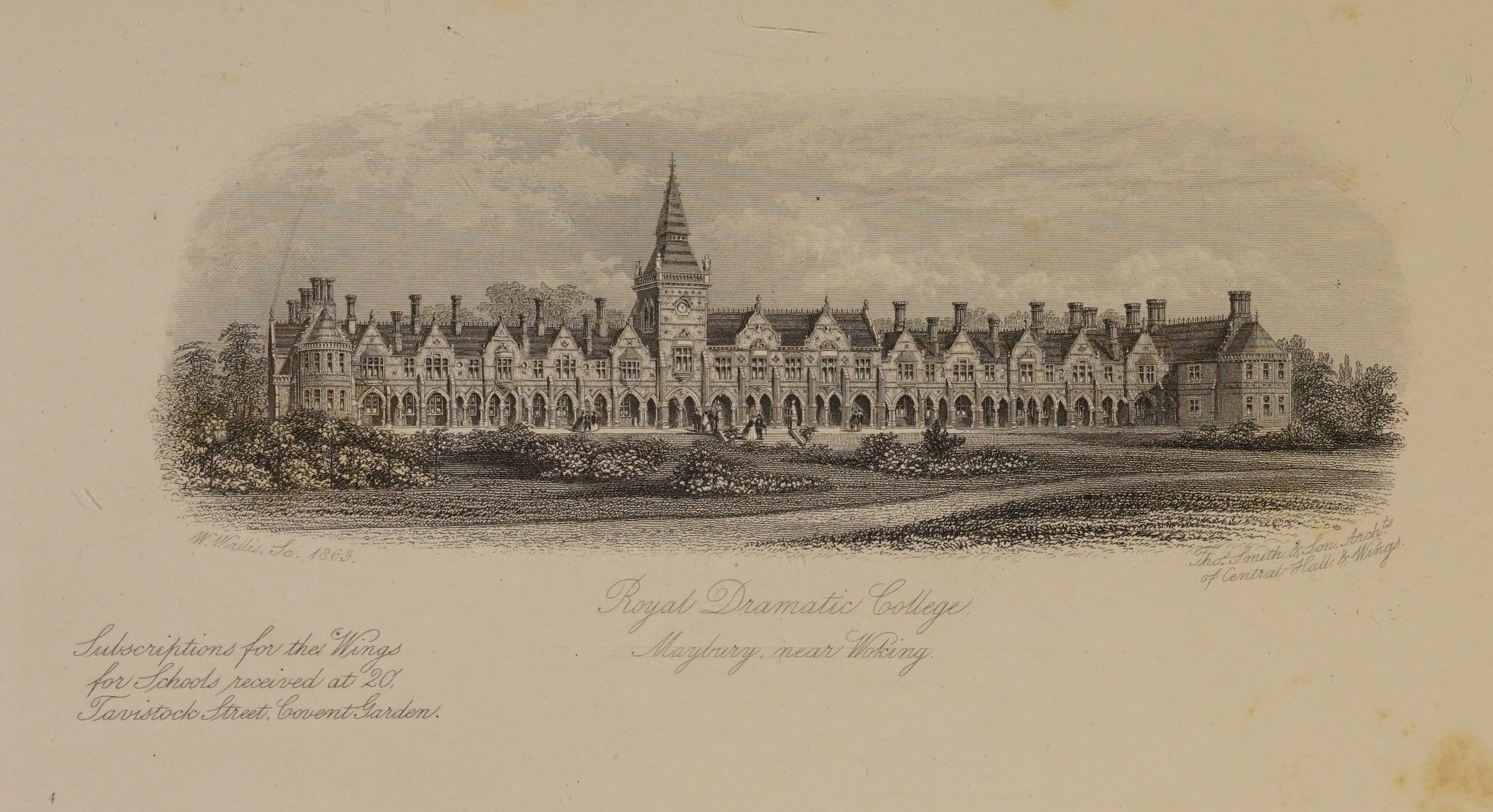
1867 engraving of the College

The Royal Dramatic College was a home for retired actors in Woking, England; it was opened by the Prince of Wales (later Edward VII) in 1865, and closed because of financial difficulty in 1877.

== Origins of the College ==
On 21 July 1858, at the Princess's Theatre, London, there was a well-attended meeting, chaired by the actor Charles Kean, to discuss the feasibility of providing almshouses for retired actors. Charles Dickens and William Makepeace Thackeray were among those present. As a result of the meeting a trust was formed, and a suitable site for the proposed building was found, in Woking where a ten-acre site in Maybury Common was purchased from the London Necropolis Company for £750.

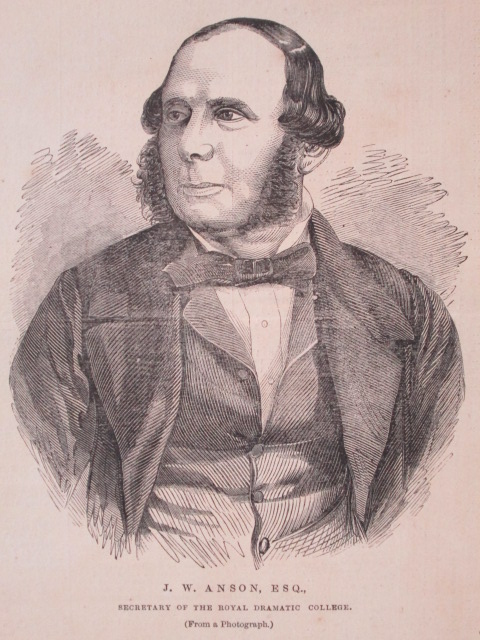
John W. Anson, Secretary of the Royal Dramatic College

This followed the inauguration, in June 1858, of a burial ground for actors, in an acre purchased from the London Necropolis Company in Woking. This site was selected by John W. Anson, Secretary of the Dramatic, Equestrian and Musical Sick Fund, which provided members with financial help when ill and a decent burial. Actors could not otherwise rely on such things: a report of the inauguration of the burial ground commented "Before this was obtained, a parish funeral, or cast among strangers, too frequently in from 6-16 inches of water, was the fate of many." Anson later became Secretary of the college.

In the autumn of 1858, Prince Albert became patron. On 9 June 1860 he travelled to Woking on a special train and laid the foundation stone of the building.

== Opening ==
After the death of Prince Albert, his son the Prince of Wales, later Edward VII, became patron. On 5 June 1865 he officially opened the College. The building, designed by T. R. Smith, had a central hall and two wings, each containing several self-contained "houses".

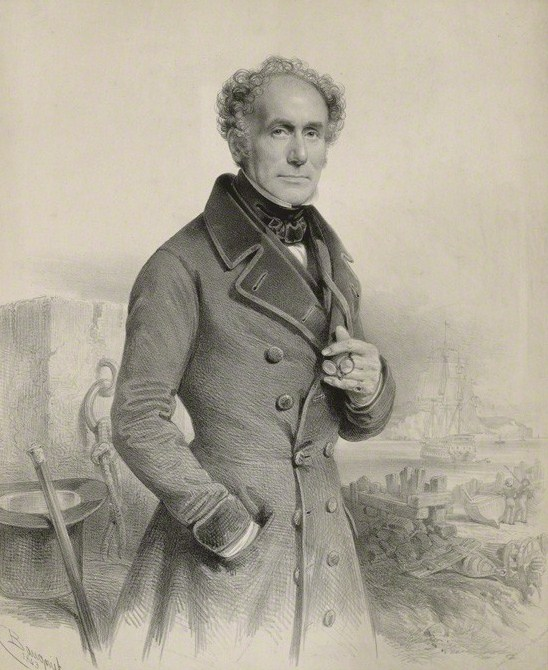
The actor Thomas Cooke in 1843

The actor Thomas Cooke gave much financial support. One of his last appearances, at Covent Garden in 1860, was for the benefit of the College. He died in 1864, and left £2000 to the College to be invested to provide a prize for "the best Drama on a Nautical or National subject", and £1000 to fund an annual dinner for the College. A. R. Slous's True to the Core: a Story of the Armada won the first drama prize and was performed on 8 Sept 1866 at the Surrey Theatre. J. S. Dilley and James Albery's The Mate of the Mountjoy, which was unperformed, won in 1868.

From 1870 the College was in financial difficulties; the building costs had been higher than expected and the running costs were high. Thomas Cooke's benefaction was insufficient and there was little public interest. In November 1877 the trustees decided to close the college.

== Later history of the building ==
The building was sold in 1884 to G. W. Leitner for a proposed Oriental Institute. The Institute closed after Leitner's death in 1899, and the building became a factory for aircraft and motorcycle manufacturer Martinsyde and later for James Walker Ltd. The building was demolished in the 1990s, and the Lion Retail Park now stands on the site (coordinates 51°19′24″N 0°32′35″W).
