= George W. Anson =

British actor (1847–1920)

George William Anson
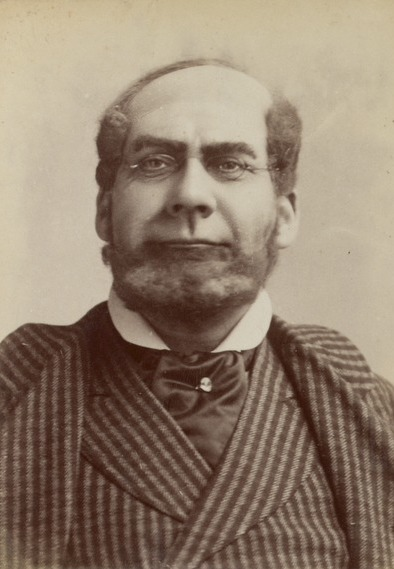
- Anson c. 1892
- Born: 25 November 1847; Montrose, Scotland
- Died: 2 August 1920 (aged 72); London
- Occupation: Actor

George W. Anson (25 November 1847 – 2 August 1920) was a British actor. He specialised in comedy roles, and appeared in New York and Sydney, Australia. He appeared in plays of Shakespeare, particularly in productions by Herbert Beerbohm Tree.

== Early life and career ==
Anson was born in Montrose in Scotland; his father was actor John W. Anson, whose early career was with theatrical companies of Dundee, Perth, Montrose and Inverness. His mother was the actress Barbara Johnson, the sister of Samuel Johnson who played the low-comedy roles in the Henry Irving Company at the Lyceum Theatre, London. George Anson first appeared on stage at the Theatre Royal, Edinburgh in December 1865. During the next few years he gained a reputation as a character actor.

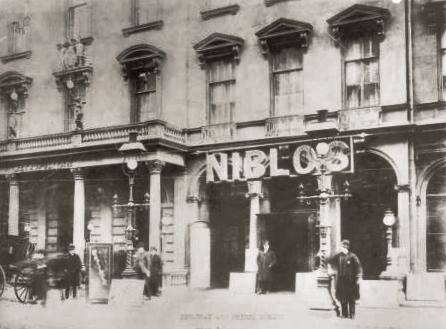
Niblo's Garden, Broadway, c.1887; Anson appeared here in 1872.

He appeared in New York in 1872, in the burlesque La Belle Sauvage by John Brougham at the Broadway theatre Niblo's Garden; later the same year he was in the burlesque Poll and Partner Joe by F. C. Burnand at the same theatre.

Anson's first appearance in London was at the Olympic Theatre in 1873, in the comedy Sour Grapes by H. J. Byron. In the following year he was in a production at the same theatre of Shakespeare's Much Ado About Nothing, in the role of Verges. Up to 1875 he was in other plays at this theatre, including Lady Clancarty, The Ticket-of-Leave Man and Henry Dunbar, all by Tom Taylor; in Henry Dunbar, playing the role of the Major, "his picture of light-hearted and ebullient villainy... was singularly life-like and unconventional".

In 1875–76 he appeared in burlesques at the Court Theatre; in 1877 he returned to the Olympic Theatre; and in 1879 he was at the Haymarket Theatre, where he appeared in The Life of an Actress by Dion Boucicault.

A critic in 1880 wrote "As an actor Mr Anson is possessed of force and pathos, and is an excellent low comedian."

The actor Sir Charles Hawtrey wrote of him, "He was a very fine character actor, especially in rough parts".

== Shakespeare, Sydney and New York ==
In 1880 he joined the company of Shakespearean actress Madame Modjeska.

In 1892 he appeared at the Criterion Theatre in Sydney, Australia, in New Men and Old Acres by Tom Taylor. The play was a success: The Sydney Mail stated it "sorely taxed the seating accommodations" and "every available corner was occupied". The Sydney Morning Herald said "Mr Anson had a tremendous reception, and the applause lasted so long that the actor had every excuse for feeling embarrassed". The following month he appeared, in the role of Eccles, in the comedy Caste by Thomas William Robertson at the same theatre. It was his final appearance before returning to England. The Sydney Morning Herald said "after the present run it is not probable that as fine a cast will ever be furnished in Australia again".

In 1897 in Broadway, he was in the comic opera La Poupée which was produced by Oscar Hammerstein I at the Olympia Theatre.

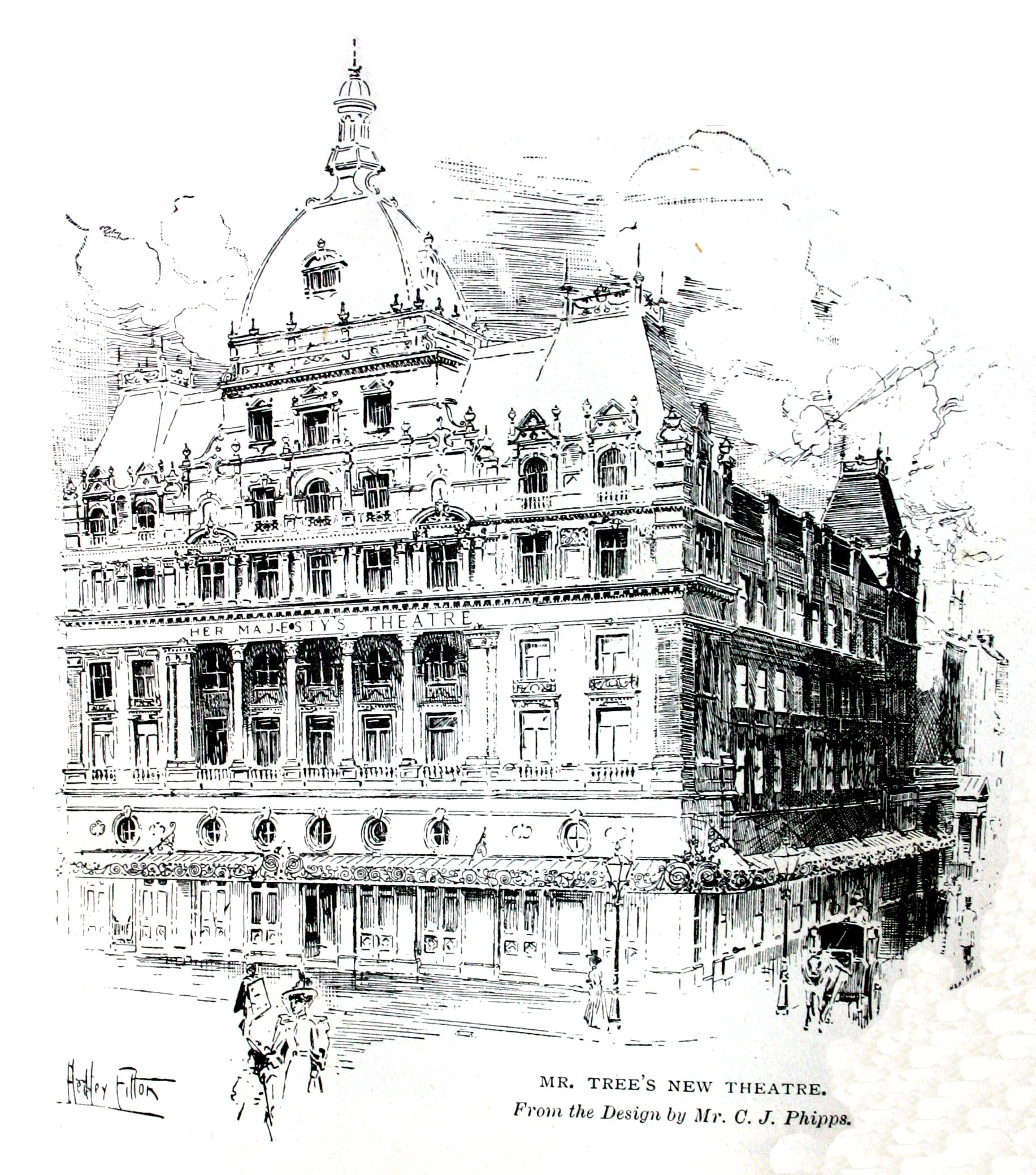
Her Majesty's Theatre in London, built in 1897; illustration in The Strand magazine.

From 1907 Anson appeared in several productions at Her Majesty's Theatre in London. They included Shakespeare's Hamlet, The Merry Wives of Windsor (as Falstaff), The Merchant of Venice (as Old Gobbo) and Julius Caesar (as Ligarius); also The School for Scandal by Richard Brinsley Sheridan and a dramatisation by J. Comyns Carr of Charles Dickens's novel The Mystery of Edwin Drood (as Durdles). This theatre was built in 1897 with the involvement of Herbert Beerbohm Tree, who directed and appeared in these plays.

Between 1910 and 1917 he appeared in various Broadway theatres. He appeared in Suzanne which ran for 64 performances at the Lyceum Theatre, opening in December 1910. It came during 1911 to Toronto, where a reviewer wrote, "The veteran English character actor George W. Anson [was] playing the role of a crusty old brewer. Mr. Anson is an artist, who for years has been associated with the most noted actors of England...."

Other Broadway plays in this period included in 1916 a revival of The Merry Wives of Windsor, in which Beerbohm Tree also appeared, and in 1917 The Barton Mystery by Walter Hackett, in which George Anson's son Albert Edward Anson also appeared.

== Movies ==
He appeared in the 1914 short film The President's Special, one of many films produced by Thomas A. Edison, Inc. up to 1918, and he was in the 1915 American film The Builder of Bridges (based on a play of that name by Alfred Sutro), directed by George Irving. He was in the British film Desire (based on a story by Balzac), directed by George Edwardes-Hall; the film appeared in 1920, the year of George Anson's death.
