= Lachlan Goudie =

Scottish artist and television presenter

Lachlan Goudie (born 1976) is a Scottish artist and television presenter.

== Early life ==
Lachlan Goudie was born in Glasgow, Scotland, in 1976, the son of Scottish figurative painter Alexander Goudie. He was educated at the Kelvinside Academy, after which he studied English Literature at Christ’s College, Cambridge. Following this, he was awarded the Levy-Plumb scholarship of a year's painting residency at Christ's College.

== Career ==
Goudie was awarded the R. S. P. Prize for painting at the Royal Glasgow Institute of the Fine Arts in 1999, and the N. S. MacFarlane Prize at the Royal Scottish Academy in 2001. He studied at the Camberwell College of Arts and is a member of the Royal Institute of Oil Painters.

He has presented the television programmes Secret Knowledge: The Art of Witchcraft (2013) and Stanley Spencer: The Colours of Clyde (2014), both on BBC Four. In 2017 and 2023 he was a judge on the BBC's The Big Painting Challenge. In 2017 he was commissioned to document the construction of new aircraft carriers for the Royal Navy.

In 2015 he wrote and presented the four-part BBC series The Story of Scottish Art.

== Selected solo exhibitions ==
- 1999: "From Cambridge to Rajasthan", Christ's College, Cambridge
- 2001: "A London Eye", Gallery Q2, London
- 2006: "Showreel", The Cremer Street Gallery, London
- 2008: "New paintings from the South of France", Thompson's Gallery
- 2009: "Dreaming Places", The Elizabeth Harris Gallery, New York
- 2010: "Of the Moment", Roger Billcliffe Gallery, Glasgow
- 2011: "A True Wilderness Heart", The Elizabeth Harris Gallery, New York
