= Anson O. Reynolds House =

Historic house in Iowa, United States

- U.S. National Register of Historic Places
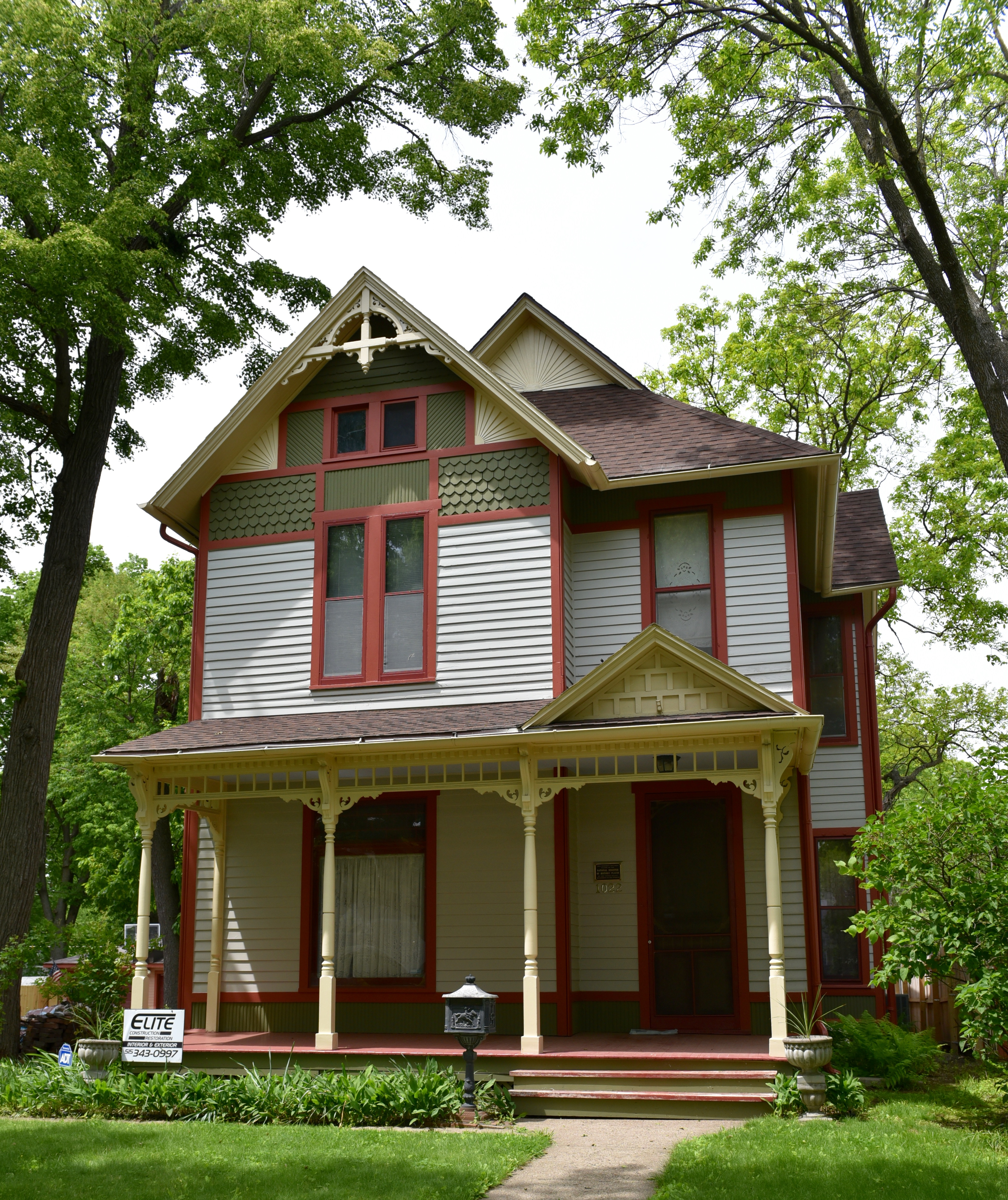

- Location within Iowa Location within the United States
- Location: 1022 26th St. Des Moines, Iowa
- Coordinates: 41°35′45.4″N 93°39′08.9″W
- Area: less than one acre
- Built: 1890
- Architectural style: Late Victorian
- MPS: Drake University and Related Properties in Des Moines, Iowa, 1881--1918 MPS
- NRHP reference No.: 88001331
- Added to NRHP: September 8, 1988

The Anson O. Reynolds House is a historic building located in Des Moines, Iowa, United States. This 2½-story dwelling features a hipped roof with a gablet, various gables, sunburst patterns, reeded panels, fishscale shingles, and bargeboards. The property on which it stands is one of ten plats that were owned by Drake University. The house's significance is attributed to the effect of the University's innovative financing techniques upon the settlement of the area around the campus. The University Land Company sold the property to S.B. Tuttle who was one of the first directors of the University Land Company. He sold it to the Reynolds in 1888, and they owned it until at least 1925. The house, built in 1890, was listed on the National Register of Historic Places in 1988.
