= Anson Wilson House =

Historic house in Iowa, United States

- U.S. National Register of Historic Places
- Location within Iowa Location within the United States
- Location: South of Maquoketa off U.S. Route 61
- Coordinates: 42°03′02″N 90°40′39″W
- Area: less than one acre
- Built: 1860
- Built by: Anson Wilson; F. Zimmerman
- NRHP reference No.: 77000521
- Added to NRHP: November 17, 1977

The Anson Wilson House is a historic residence located south of Maquoketa, Iowa, United States. Wilson was a native of Canada who arrived in Jackson County in 1839 and squatted on his claim on the prairie from 1840 until the US Government made it available for purchase in 1846. In his early years he worked a variety of manual jobs before settling into farming. With stonecutter F. Zimmerman built this two-story limestone house in 1860. Outbuildings for the farming operation were built about the same time. The rectangular plan house is composed of coarsely-dressed limestone blocks laid in a random ashlar pattern. A single-story frame addition was built on the back of the house in 1896. It was replaced by a more modern version in 1969. The house was listed on the National Register of Historic Places in 1977.
