= Rupert Anson =

English cricketer

Personal information
- Born: 7 November 1889; Marylebone, London
- Died: 20 December 1966 (aged 77); Dorset
- Batting: Right-handed
- Bowling: Right-arm slow

Domestic team information
- Years: Team
- 1910: Middlesex

Career statistics
| Competition | First-class |
|---|---|
| Matches | 33 |
| Runs scored | 1,030 |
| Batting average | 22.88 |
| 100s/50s | 0/6 |
| Top score | 97 |
| Balls bowled | 596 |
| Wickets | 10 |
| Bowling average | 23.30 |
| 5 wickets in innings | 1 |
| 10 wickets in match | 0 |
| Best bowling | 5/39 |
| Catches/stumpings | 16/– |
- Source: CricketArchive, 15 August 2008

Rupert Anson (7 November 1889 – 20 December 1966) was an English first-class cricketer who played for Middlesex County Cricket Club, Marylebone Cricket Club and HDG Leveson Gower's XI. His highest score of 97 came when playing for Middlesex in the match against Essex County Cricket Club in 1914. He also scored 97 when playing for Marylebone Cricket Club against Oxford University Cricket Club, also in 1914. His best bowling of 5/39 came when playing for Middlesex in the match against Gloucestershire County Cricket Club in 1911.

He was educated at Harrow School where he was a member of the XI.
