= Anson Phelps Stokes (disambiguation) =

Anson Phelps Stokes may refer to:

- Anson Phelps Stokes (1838–1913), merchant, banker, publicist, and multimillionaire
- Anson Phelps Stokes Jr. (1874–1958), educator and clergyman; son of the banker
- Anson Phelps Stokes (bishop) (1905–1986), Episcopal bishop of Massachusetts and son of the philanthropist
