= Pascal Anson =

English artist

Pascal Anson (born 1973) is a designer and artist.

Born in South London, Anson attended Wilson's School in Wallington and studied three-dimensional design at Kingston University. He completed his studies at the Royal College of Art in London in 2000 with an MA in Design Products. He works across many disciplines in art and design from graphics and clothing to interiors and vehicles. He is teaching within Interior behaviours platform at the Royal College of Art.

== Awards and recognition ==
In 2005 he was awarded an Esmée Fairbain scholarship from the Design Museum in London and the British Council, this led to his work being shown in Italy, Japan, Greece, Australia and Singapore.

On 31 August 2011 it was announced that Pascal Anson's concept livery would be used on 12 British Airways planes to be used for the 2012 Olympic Games in London. During the project Pascal was mentored by Tracey Emin, as part of BA's Great Britons Programme.

The first British Airways Airbus, A319-131 G-EUPH 'The Dove' was unveiled at Heathrow Airport on 3 April 2011, and has been seen in many European airports since then.

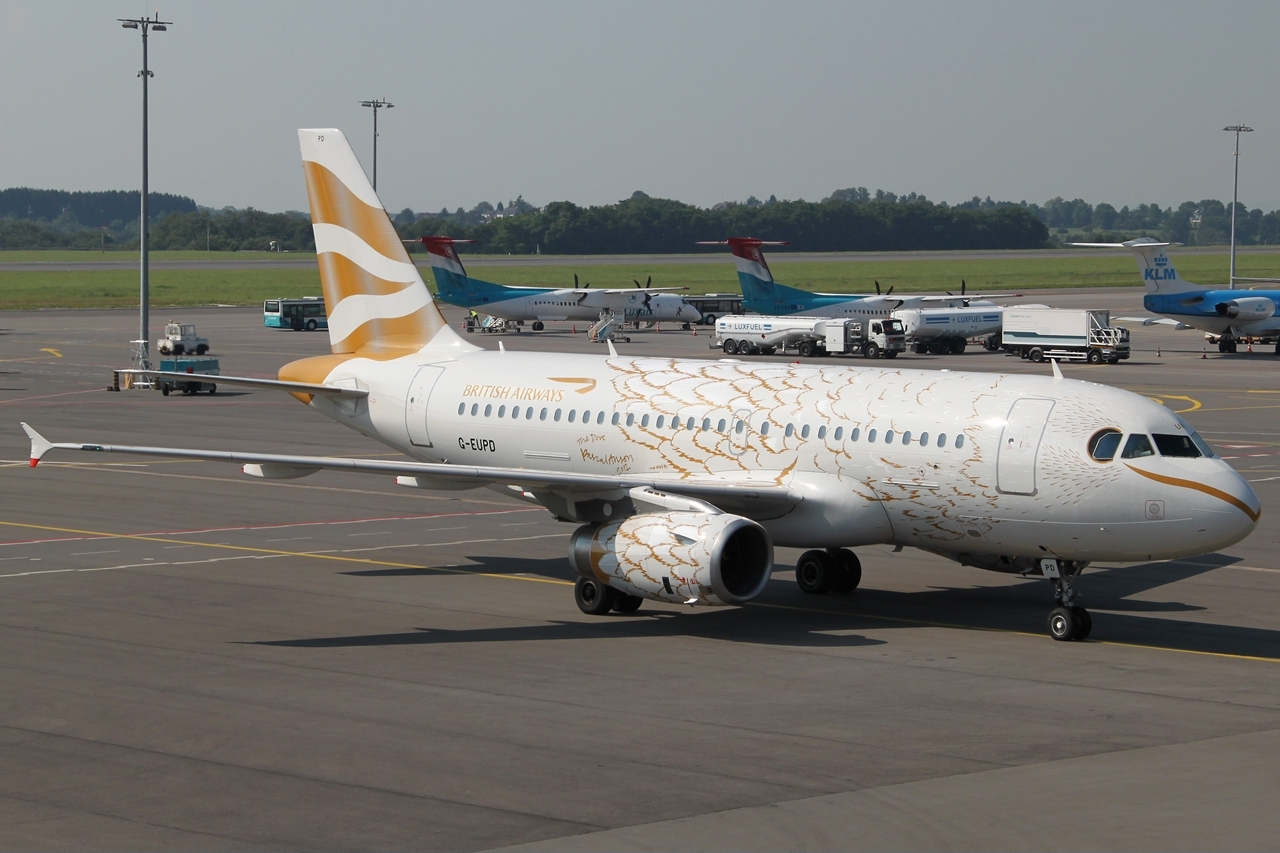
Airbus A319-131 British Airways

In 2017 Pascal became one of two mentors, alongside Diana Ali, in the revamped BBC programme, The Big Painting Challenge, coaching contestants on their painting technique.

Recently his 'monoclo' (single color clothing) style advocacy became a recognized effort in rethinking relations to ones own clothing and sustainability.
