= Samuel Johnson (comedian) =

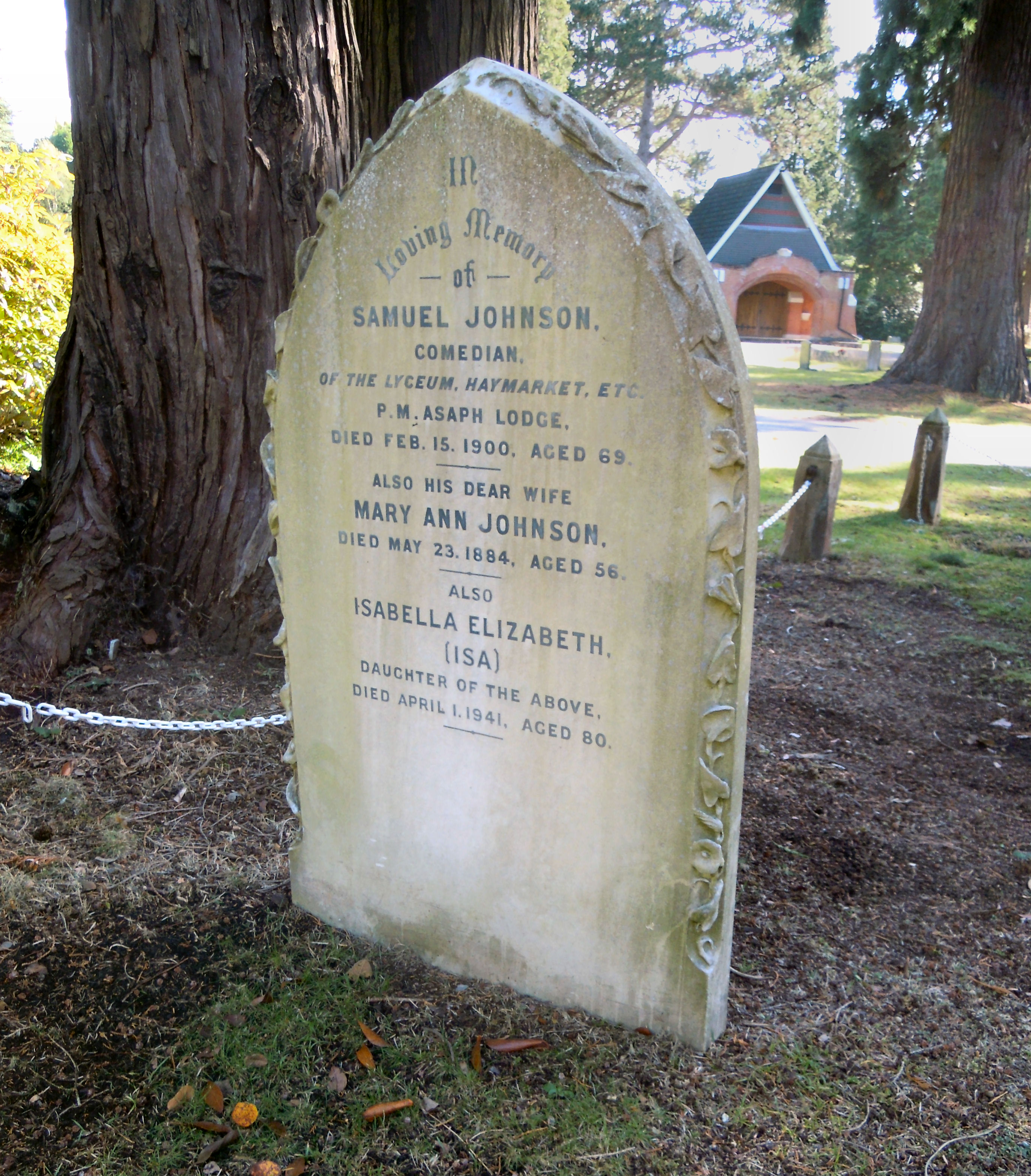
The grave of Samuel Johnson at Brookwood Cemetery

Samuel Johnson (1830–15 February 1900) was an actor-manager and Shakespearean actor of the 19th century and a member of Henry Irving's Company at the Lyceum Theatre, for which he played the comedic roles.

== Early career ==
Born in Ayrshire, Sam Johnson was one of at least seven children born to the actor Samuel Johnson and Isabella (née Elliott). Most of his siblings were actors, while one brother was a scene painter. He first appeared on stage at the Maryport Theatre in Cumberland in 1844 as Bartolo in The Wife. In 1845 he and his two sisters went to Belfast and joined Cunningham's company at the Theatre Royal. In 1846 he and his sister, the actress Barbara Johnson, were appearing in Belfast. In December 1846 Barbara Johnson married the actor John W. Anson. The three, together with two others from the Belfast company, moved to Scotland where they formed a new company, of which John Anson was manager. From early 1847 in the Perth area, they appeared in towns with a repertory of plays so that the audience of each town could see several plays in a week. Barbara Anson took the lead female roles, and John Anson and Samuel Johnson shared the low comedy parts. Late in 1847 the trio played in the Dundee area.

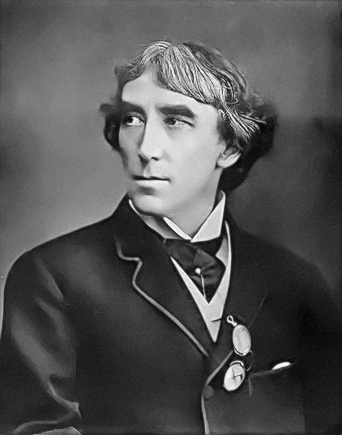
Johnson first worked with Henry Irving in 1856.

From 1853 to 1855 he was in partnership with John Coleman, and the two rented theatres in Stockport, Oldham (where over 2,000 applicants responded to their advert for actors), Cambridge and Sheffield. On leaving the partnership Johnson appeared at the Lyceum Theatre in Sunderland and the Theatre Royal in Newcastle. The New Royal Lyceum Theatre re-opened in Sunderland in 1856 with a production of Bulwer Lytton's play Richelieu, in which Johnson played the Governor and the 18-year-old Henry Irving played Gaston, Duke of Orleans. When the inexperienced Irving got stage fright and was hissed off the stage, Johnson was among those who supported Irving with practical advice. Later in life Irving gave them all regular work when he formed his own company at the Lyceum Theatre.

== London and Dublin ==
Johnson made his London stage début at a Savage Club performance at the Lyceum Theatre as Cassim Baba in The Forty Thieves. He then joined the company at Astley's Amphitheatre, appearing in plays and farces until early 1860. From 1860 to late 1862 Johnson was in Edinburgh where he played low comedy roles and Scottish characters, and from April to December 1862 he was actor-manager of the new Theatre Royal at St Helens. During 1863 he appeared at the St James's Theatre in The Carte de Visite and played Spilliken in H.J. Byron's Goldenhair the Good and Leontes in William Brough's burlesque Perdita, the title role being played by Marie Wilton.

From 1864 to 1873 Johnson was a member of the Company of the Theatre Royal in Dublin. Here, among other roles, he played the Gravedigger in Hamlet (1864), and M'Nally in the first performance of Dion Boucicault's Arrah-na-Pogue (1864), with Boucicault, John Brougham and Samuel Anderson Emery in the cast.

== Lyceum Theatre ==
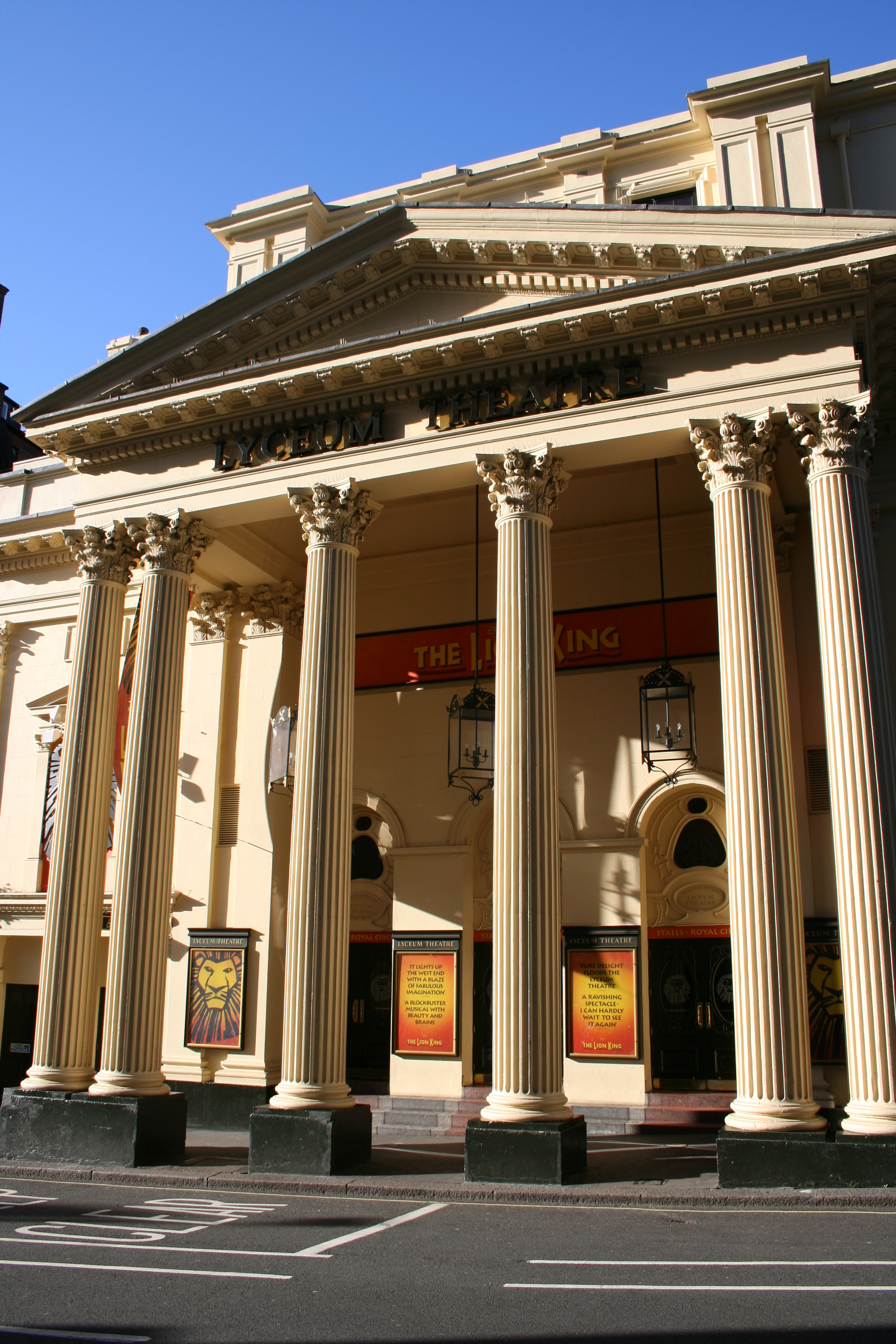
The Lyceum Theatre in London. Johnson acted here from 1878 to 1899.

From 1874 to 1878 Johnson was actor and stage manager with Mr. Warden's Company in Belfast, touring with the company to Edinburgh and Glasgow in a series of old comedies. With his daughter Isa Johnson he appeared in a number of Easter pantomimes. In August 1878 he was at the Lyceum Theatre in London as Police Sergeant Tollit in Mary Warner.

Immediately after this play finished, the Lyceum was taken over by Henry Irving who asked Johnson to join his new company at the theatre. Johnson stayed with Irving's Lyceum Theatre Company until 1899, playing in twenty-three productions, and went to America on five of the Lyceum tours. While many of his roles with the company were small, John Martin-Harvey described him as the acknowledged Shakespearean clown of his day, and his Lancelot Gobbo in The Merchant of Venice, Dogberry in Much Ado About Nothing (1882 and 1893) and Gravedigger in Hamlet reflect this.

For Irving, Johnson played Mr. Wardle in Jingle, Sancho Panza in Don Quixote, Samson Rawbold in The Iron Chest, Farmer Flamborough in Olivia (opposite Hermann Vezin as Dr. Primrose), Jock Howieson in The King and the Miller (1890 and 1895), Choppard in The Lyons Mail, and played in Eugene Aram and Faust. He was Feste in Twelfth Night, Colonna in The Corsican Brothers (1880 and 1891), Countryman in Becket (1893 and 1894), Marcel in Louis XI (1890), Porter in Macbeth (1895) and Hans in The Bells (1891 to 1898). His daughter Isa Johnson played Annette in The Bells for a few performances at the Lyceum and went on one of the company's provincial tours.

== Last years ==
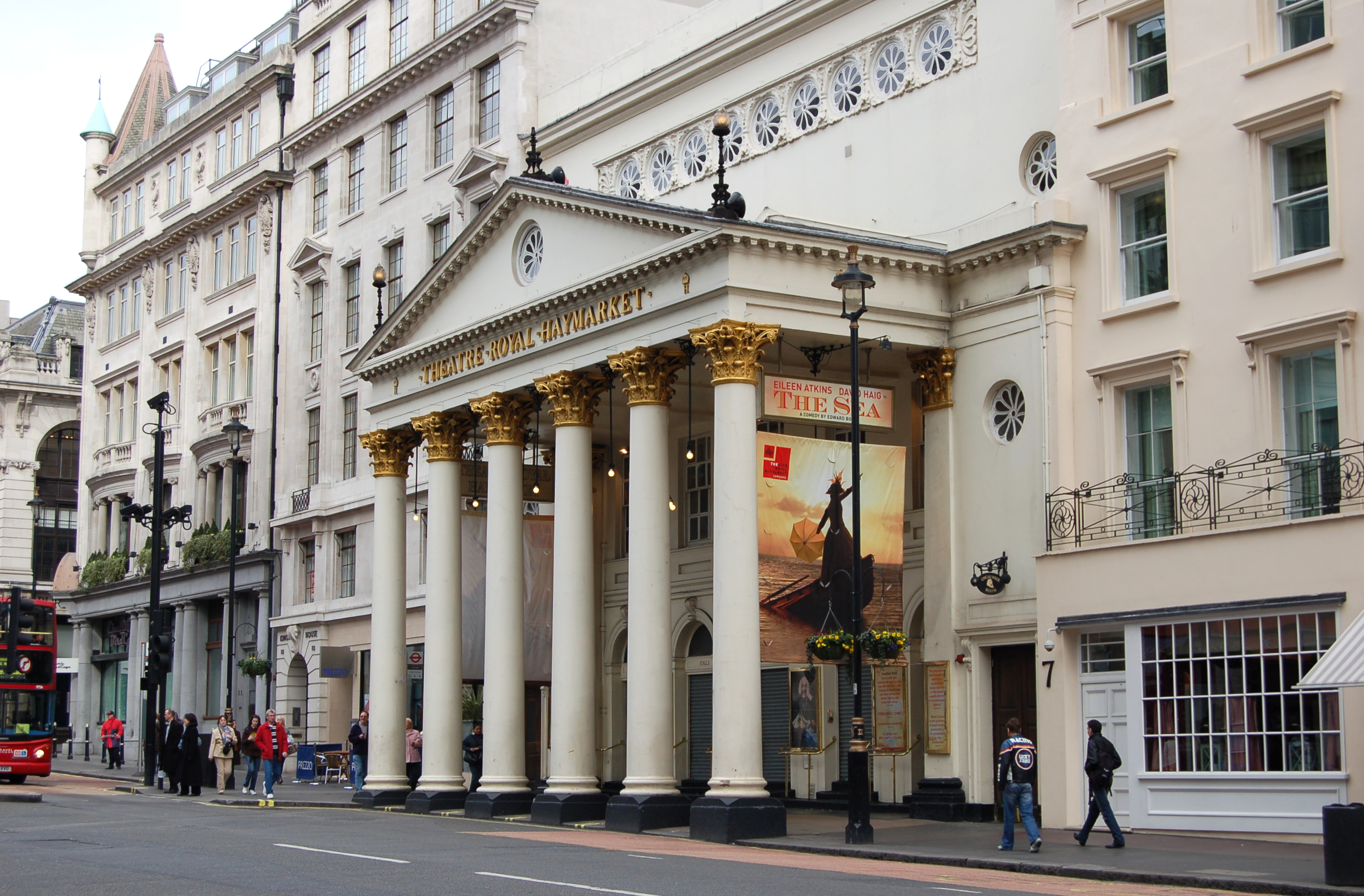
Johnson's last performance was at the Theatre Royal Haymarket weeks before his death.

In February 1899 Johnson played Mr. Stryver in The Only Way, again at the Lyceum Theatre but now under John Martin-Harvey as manager. Not feeling in the best of health, Johnson decided not to join the sixth Lyceum tour to America, appearing instead in his last role as Meester van Speenen in The Black Tulip with Cyril Maude and Winifred Emery at the Theatre Royal Haymarket in a production that ran for 77 performances and which closed on 6 January 1900.

A heavy drinker, Johnson died of cirrhosis of the liver on 15 February 1900, at 29 Weltje Road in Hammersmith, London.

== Personal life ==
He married Mary Ann Hornby on 10 July 1858 at Marske-by-the-Sea. The couple had a son, Samuel Forster Johnson (1859–1860), and a daughter, the actress Isabella 'Isa' Elizabeth Johnson (1861–1941). A Freemason, he was a Past Master of Asaph Lodge.

Johnson is buried in Brookwood Cemetery (Plot 118 Actors Acre) with his wife, son and daughter and in the same plot as his sister and her husband, John W. Anson. The funeral was attended by his brother John Johnson and by actors and others from Asaph Lodge, Logic Club, Genesius Club, the Actors' Association, the Lyceum Benevolent Fund and the Actors' Benevolent Fund. Henry Irving and other members of the Lyceum Theatre Company were still on tour in America and were therefore not able to attend.
