= Gottlieb Wilhelm Leitner =

British orientalist

Gottlieb Leitner
- Leitner, at the age of 21, while a professor at King's College, London, c. 1861
- Born: Gottlieb Wilhelm Leitner; 14 October 1840; Pest, Hungary
- Died: 22 March 1899 (aged 58); Bonn, German Empire
- Citizenship: Great Britain
- Occupation: Orientalist
- Years active: 1864–1893
- Organization(s): Government College, Lahore; University of the Punjab

Gottlieb Wilhelm Leitner (14 October 1840 – 22 March 1899), also known as G.W. Leitner, was a Hungarian-born British orientalist and the first principal of Government College, Lahore.

== Early life and education ==
Gottlieb Wilhelm Leitner was born in Pest, Hungary, on 14 October 1840 to a Jewish family. His mother was Marie Henriette Herzberg. His father, Leopold Saphir, died when Gottlieb was young and his mother then married Johann Moritz Leitner. Gottlieb and his sister Elisabeth (the mother of British politician Leopold Amery) were thereafter known as Leitner.

As a child, Leitner showed an extraordinary ability in languages. At the age of eight he went to Constantinople to learn Arabic and Turkish, and by the age of ten he was fluent in Turkish, Arabic and most European languages. At fifteen, he was appointed Interpreter (First Class) to the British Commissariat in the Crimea, with the rank of colonel. When the Crimean War ended, he wanted to become a priest and went to study at King's College London.

It is also reported that during his tour of Muslim countries he adopted a Muslim name of Abdur Rasheed Sayyah. Sayyah in Arabic means a traveller.

As a linguist, he is said to have had acquaintance with some fifty languages, many of which he spoke fluently. At nineteen, he became lecturer in Arabic, Turkish and Modern Greek, and at twenty-one was appointed Professor in Arabic and Muslim Law at King's College London.

Three years later, in 1864, he became Principal of Government College University (Lahore) (then British India, now Pakistan). He was instrumental in the foundation of the University of the Punjab in 1882. He took over as the first Registrar of University of the Punjab. He founded many schools, literary associations, public libraries and academic journals, while also dedicating himself to the study of the cultures of the Indian subcontinent. During this period he wrote a scholarly and comprehensive book in Urdu, History of Islam, in two volumes, with the help of an Urdu Muslim scholar, Maulvi Karim-ud-Din, who was at that time District Inspector of Schools in Amritsar, Punjab. These two volumes were later published, in 1871 and 1876. Following the passage of the Royal Titles Act 1876 which declared Queen Victoria Empress of India, Prof. Leitner coined the title Kaysar-i-Hind as the new Empress' official title.

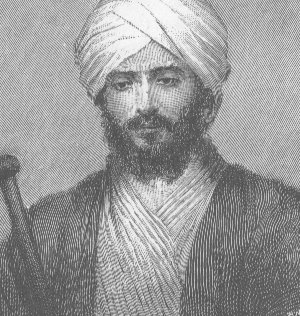
Leitner, at the age of 26, dressed in native costume while exploring Dardistan. Taken from the Strand Magazine, 1894.

He retired from the Indian Civil Service in 1886.

== Return to Europe ==
He returned to Europe in the late 1870s to pursue studies at Heidelberg University (Germany), and also undertook work for the Austrian, Prussian, and British governments. His ambition now was to found a centre for the study in Europe of Oriental languages, culture and history. On his return to England in 1881, he sought a suitable site for his proposed institution, and in 1883 came upon the vacant Royal Dramatic College in Woking, a building admirably suited for the purpose.

For the benefit of Muslim students, Leitner commissioned the construction of a mosque. The Shah Jahan Mosque was built in 1889, one of the first mosques in Western Europe and the first purpose-built one in Britain, still in operation. It was built in Indo-Saracenic style, named after Sultan Shah Jahan, Begum of Bhopal (1868–1901).

Shah Jahan Begum made sizable donations towards the building of the mosque and also contributed generously towards the founding of the Muhammadan Anglo-Oriental College at Aligarh, which developed into the Aligarh Muslim University.

== Inscription on the tomb of Dr G.W. Leitner ==
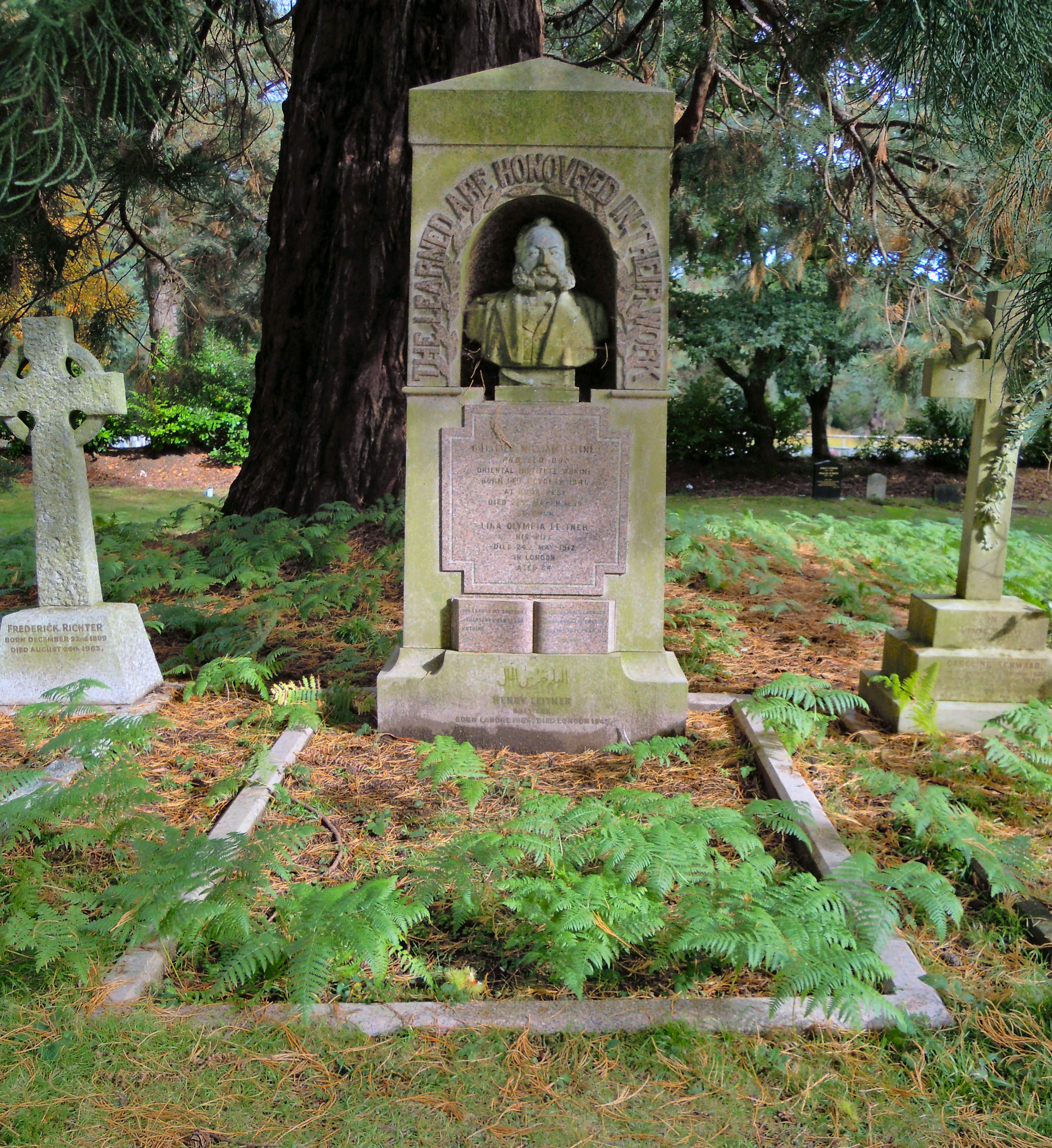
Leitner's tomb in Brookwood Cemetery

Dr. Leitner is buried at Brookwood Cemetery (Plot 2), near Woking.

THE LEARNED ARE HONOURED IN THEIR WORK

GOTTLIEB WILLIAM LEITNER
ORIENTAL INSTITUTE WOKING
BORN 14TH OCTOBER 1840 AT BUDAPEST
DIED 22ND MARCH 1899 AT BONN
________________________

LINA OLYMPIA LEITNER
HIS WIFE
DIED 24TH MAY 1912 IN LONDON
AGED 64
________________________

The Lord is my shepherd therefore can I lack nothing.
Yea, Though I walk through the valley of the shadow of death,
I will fear no evil. (Ps. XXIII)
________________________

Al-'ilmu khayrum min al-maali

[Learning is better than riches]

HENRY LEITNER
Only son
Born Lahore 1869 – Died London 1945

== Major works ==
- On the Sciences of language and of ethnography, with general reference to the language and customs of the people of Hanza: A report of an extempore address. (nach 1856).
- Introduction to a philosophical Grammar of Arabic: Being an attempt to discover a few simple principles in Arabic Grammar. Reprinted and slightly enlarged from the "Panjab Educational Magazine", Lahore 1871
- The Sinin-i-Islam; The races of Turkey; History of Dardistan, songs, legends etc.; Graeco-budhistic discoveries; History of indigenous education in the Panjab since annexation.
- A lecture on the races of Turkey, both of Europe and of Asia, and the state of their education: being, principally, a contribution to Muhammadan education. Lahore 1871.
- A detailed analysis of Abdul Ghafur's dictionary of the terms used by criminal tribes in the Panjab. Lahore 1880.
- History of indigenous education in the Punjab since annexation and in 1882. Calcutta 1882. Reprint Delhi: Amar Prakashan, 1882.
- The Kunza and Nagyr handbook being an introduction to a Knowledge of the language. Calcutta 1889.
- Dardistan in 1866, 1886 and 1893: being an account of the history, religions, customs, legends, fables, and songs of Gilgit, Chilas, Kandia (Gabrial), Yasin, Chitral, Hunza, Aagyr, and other parts of the Hindukush, Reprint der Ausgabe Woking, Oriental Univ. Inst., 1893, New Delhi: Bhavana Books & Prints, 2001 ISBN 81-86505-49-0
- Dardistan in 1866, 1886 and 1893 : being an account of the history, religions, customs, legends, fables and songs of Gilgit Chilas, Kandia (Gabrial) Yasin, Chitral, Hunza, Nagyr and other parts of the Hindukush; as also a suppl. to the 2. ed. of The Hunza and Nagyr handbook and an epitome of p. 3 of the author's "The languages and races of Dardistan". Reprint of the edition 1889, Karachi: Indus Publ., 1985.
