= Albert Edward Anson =

British actor

A. E. Anson
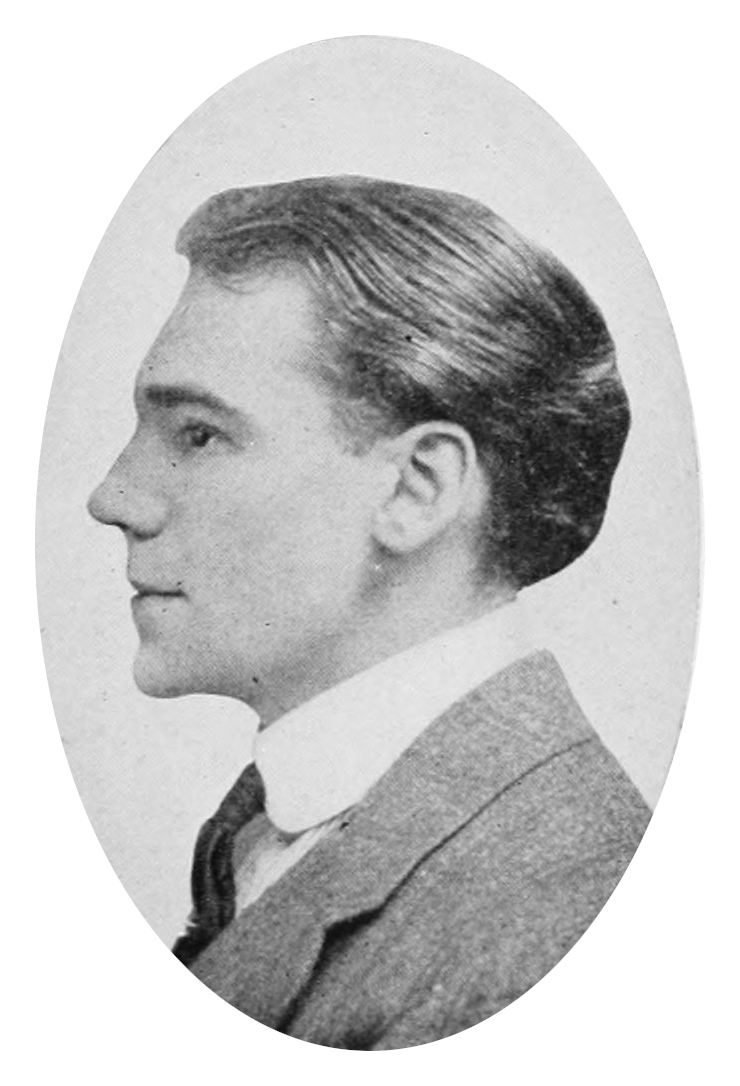
- Born: 14 September 1879; London, England
- Died: 25 June 1936 (aged 56); Monrovia, California, U.S.
- Occupation: Actor
- Spouses: Cora Busch, Deirdre Doyle, Mary Malleson

Albert Edward Anson (14 September 1879 – 25 June 1936) was a British stage and screen actor. Born in London, he made his first appearance onstage in 1895. He left the stage briefly to pursue a degree in engineering and returned to appear with Beerbohm Tree's company in 1904. He became known for his performances in Shakespearian roles on stages in London and New York.

In 1931, Anson made his screen debut in John Ford's film Arrowsmith. Director Frank Capra cast him as the "High Lama" in the film Lost Horizon, but Anson died before filming began and the role was subsequently given to Sam Jaffe.

== Stage career ==
His father was the Shakespearean and character actor George W. Anson.

His stage debut was at the Court Theatre in London on 27 April 1895. In 1904, like his father before him, he joined Herbert Beerbohm Tree's company. In 1905 he played Brabantio in Othello, his first major role.

In 1905 he toured the US,appearing in Clyde Fitch's play The Toast of the Town alongside Viola Allen and Hassard Short.

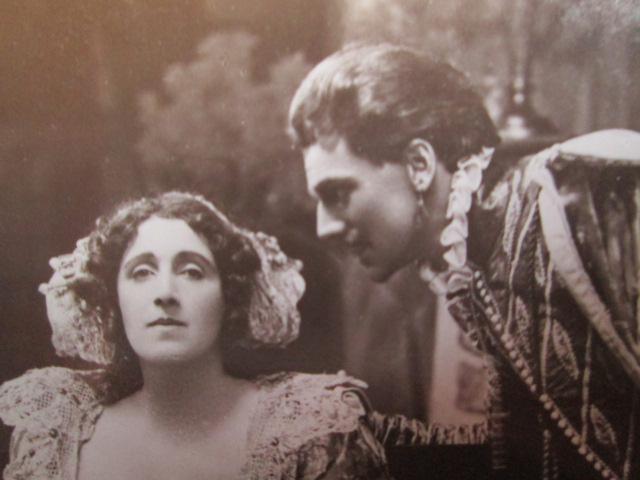
Julia Neilson and Anson in Henry of Navarre

He first appeared in New York in 1902, in Shakespeare's Julius Caesar.

As a member of the New Theatre Company, which included many English actors, Anson appeared in the first production staged at the New Theatre in New York. Opening on 6 November 1909, the production was Shakespeare's Antony and Cleopatra, in which he played Octavian. Later that month he also appeared in John Galsworthy's Strife, which opened on 17 November. The company produced Shakespeare's The Merry Wives of Windsor, which opened on 7 November 1910, Anson playing Master Ford. The production was staged in Toronto in December 1910, where a reviewer wrote, "Mr. Anson was especially fine as the jealous husband Ford. Indeed his was a performance that deepened the significance of the play."

He was in The Witness for the Defence by A. E. W. Mason, which ran for 64 performances at the Empire Theatre, opening in December 1911. This came to Toronto, where the same reviewer wrote, "Mr. A. E. Anson... is known to be one of the most eloquent actors of the day – a man much of the type of Sir George Alexander, the possessor of a beautiful voice and the bearing of a person of distinction as he is supposed to be in the play."

The play Romance by Edward Sheldon, in which Anson played Cornelius van Tuyl, ran for 160 performances in 1913 at the Maxine Elliott Theatre. A critic wrote, "Mr. Anson's complete command of the resources of his art is a treat to all lovers of acting, and his suave ease upon the stage a thing to be copied by many a player." In London, Romance opened at the Duke of York's Theatre on 6 October 1915; Anson, who produced the play, appeared again as van Tuyl. The play ran for 1,049 performances.

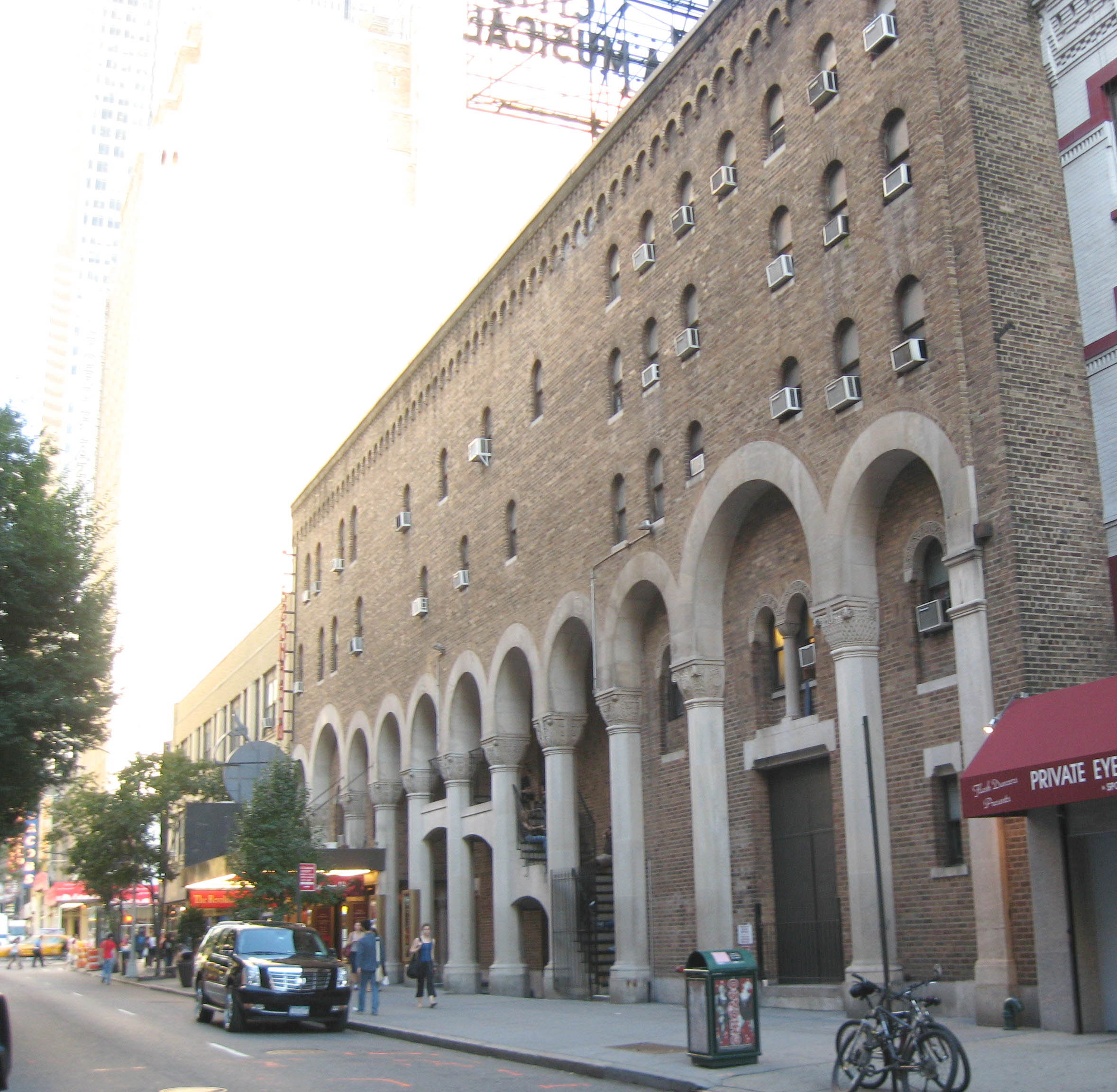
The Martin Beck Theatre, on W 45th St, New York (now the Al Hirschfeld Theatre), where Anson staged and appeared in the play Cape Smoke by Walter Archer Frost in 1925; it ran for 104 performances

Back in New York, he reprised the role of van Tuyl in the 1921 revival of Romance at the Playhouse Theatre, where it ran for 106 performances.

He was in the play White Cargo, which ran for 257 performances at the Greenwich Village Theatre, opening in November 1923, Anson playing Witzel. The play was written and staged by Leon Gordon. (It was made into a film in 1942.)

He married three times: to actress Cora Busch in 1902 (their daughter Cora Marjorie Viola Anson was born in 1906) and they divorced in 1912; to actress Deirdre Doyle in 1912, they were later divorced; thirdly to actress Mary Malleson, with whom he appeared in New York in The Barton Mystery by Walter Hackett in 1917; he also directed this play. During the 1920s he was engaged to, but did not marry, the actress Marjorie Rambeau with whom he was in two New York productions: As You Like It in 1923, and The Road Together (which closed after one performance) by George Middleton in 1924.

== Movies ==
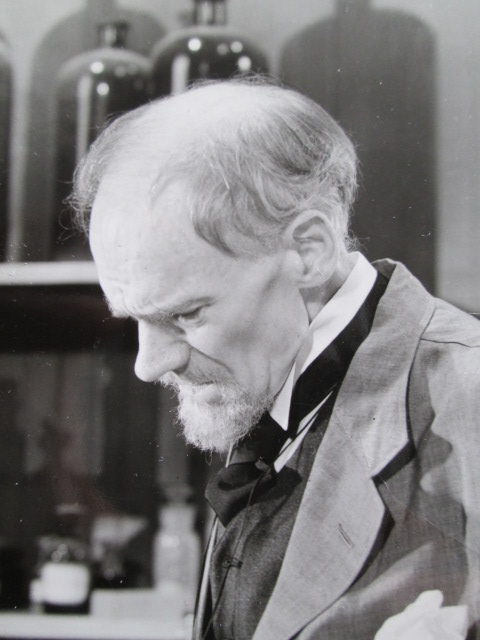
Anson in Arrowsmith

In the 1930s he moved to California. He appeared in the 1931 film Arrowsmith, directed by John Ford. The film was based on the novel “Arrowsmith” by Sinclair Lewis, about the life of Martin Arrowsmith, an idealistic doctor (played by Ronald Colman); Anson played the part of his mentor Dr Gottlieb. Anson had a minor part in the 1931 William Powell romantic drama The Road to Singapore, directed by Alfred E. Green and based on the play Heatwave by Denise Robins and Roland Pertwee.
