= John W. Anson =

British actor (1817–1881)

John William Anson
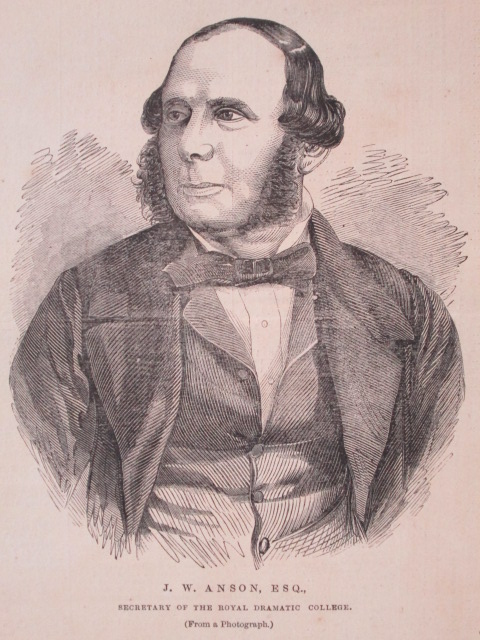
- Sketch of the actor, printed in The Illustrated Sporting News in 1862
- Born: 31 July 1817; London
- Died: 6 February 1881 (aged 63); London
- Occupation: Actor
- Spouse: Barbara Johnson

John W. Anson (31 July 1817 – 6 February 1881) was a British actor, noted for his work for the welfare of actors.

== Early career ==
At 20 Anson was a member of the "Garrick Amateur Club" in Cambridge, where he played leading roles. He began his professional career in 1843 at the Theatre Royal, Bath in the play The Wonder by Susanna Centlivre, in the role of Lissardo. Recently recovered evidence in the Theatre Collection Bristol indicates that Anson's career may have started earlier, in 1842, in a production of Ion by Frederick Fox Cooper.

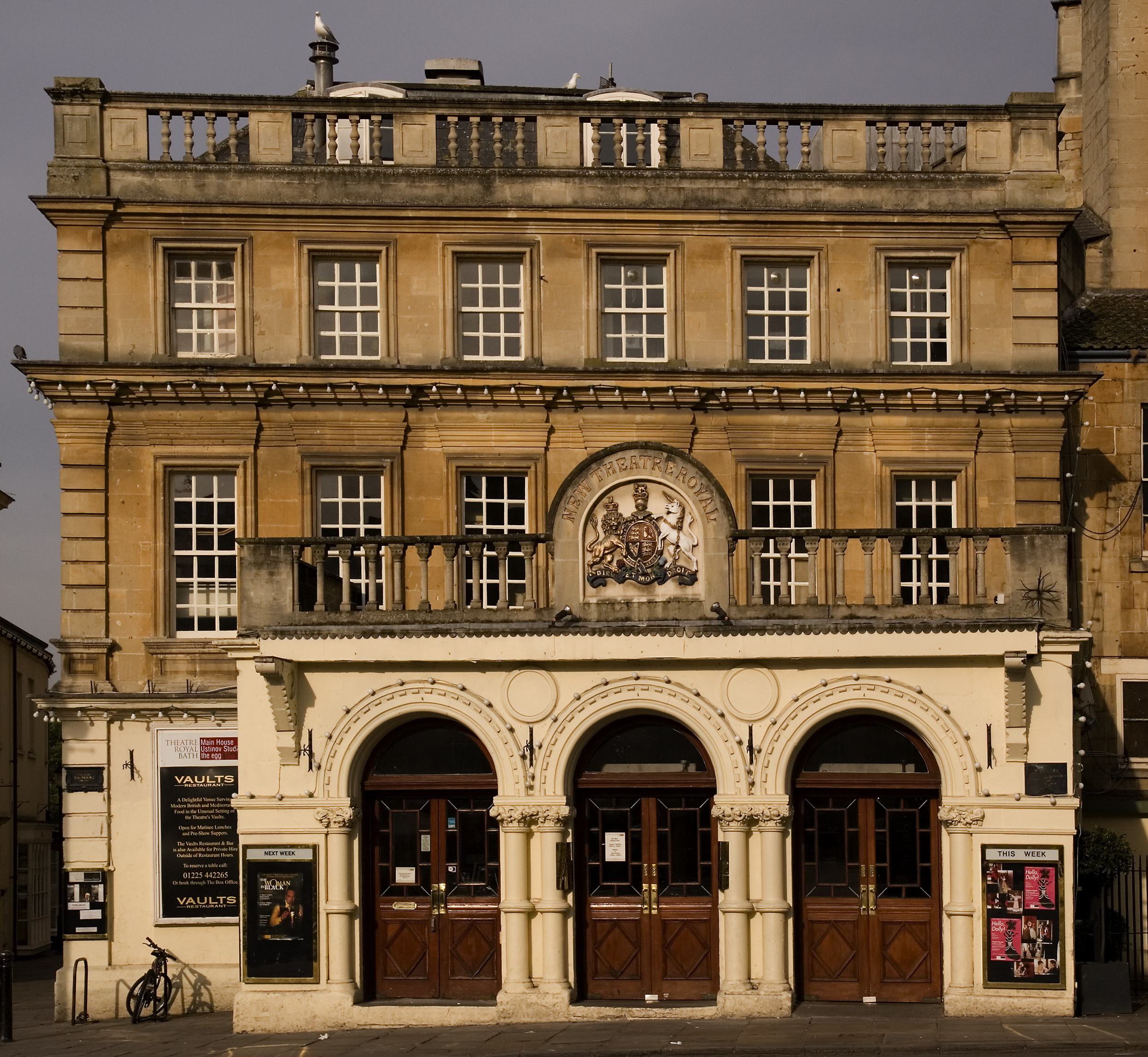
The Theatre Royal, Bath, where Anson first appeared professionally in 1843

He appeared in Southampton and York, and later at the Theatre Royal in Belfast, where he spent four years.

On 27 December 1846 in Belfast, Anson married Scottish actress Barbara Johnson, who with her brother, actor Samuel Johnson (c.1830–1900) was appearing there. The three, together with two others from the Belfast company, moved to Scotland where they formed a new company, of which Anson was manager. From early 1847 in the Perth area, they appeared in towns with a repertory of plays so that the audience of each town could see several plays in a week. Barbara Anson took the lead female roles, and Anson and Samuel Johnson shared the low comedy parts.

Late in 1847 they played in the Dundee area. While in Montrose in November 1847, John and Barbara Anson's son George W. Anson, who became a notable actor, was born. In 1850 the company moved to Inverness.

== London ==
In 1853 John Anson and his family moved to London, where his first appearance was at Astley's Amphitheatre; he played there the Shakespearean role of Falstaff, and Bailie Nicol Jarvie in a dramatization of Walter Scott's novel Rob Roy.

In December 1857 his wife Barbara died of tuberculosis.

He was involved with the Adelphi Theatre, which was managed by Benjamin Webster, for many years; he was treasurer of the theatre from 1859–71 and 1873–74.

== Welfare of actors ==
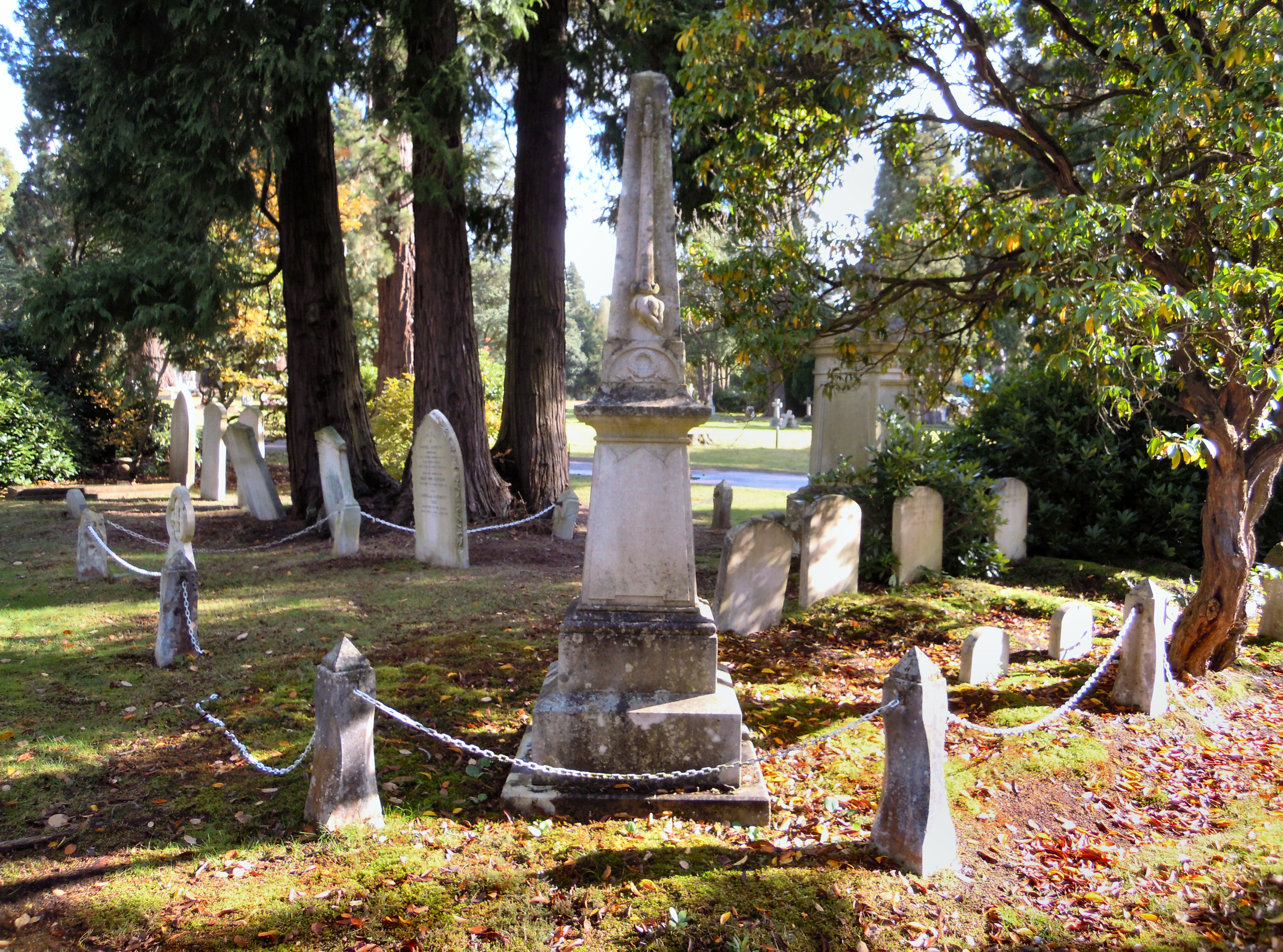
Anson's grave in Brookwood Cemetery

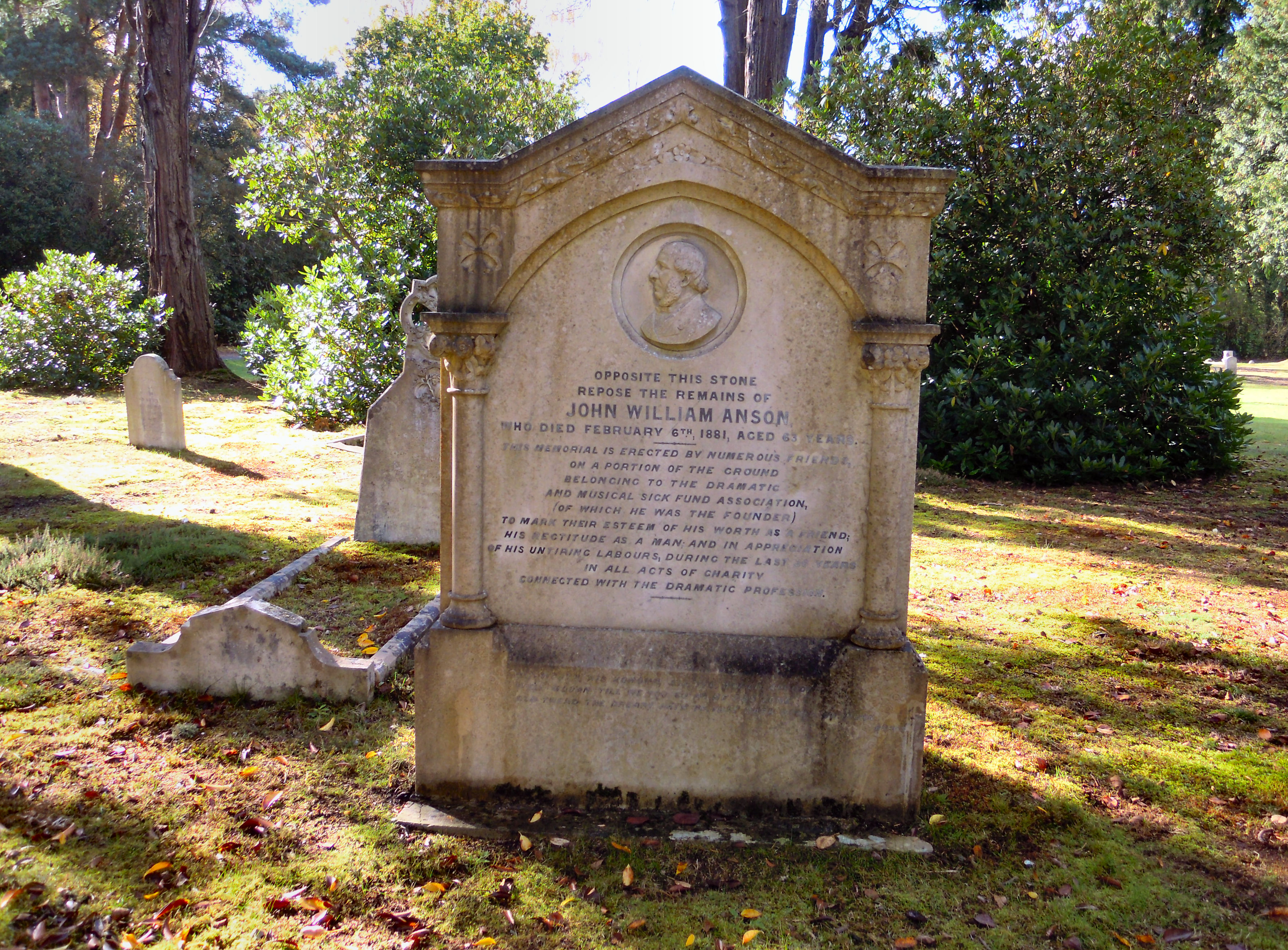
Memorial to Anson located opposite his grave

Anson took a great interest in the welfare of actors who through illness or old age could not continue in their profession. In July 1855 he founded the Dramatic, Equestrian and Musical Sick Fund Association. Its members included, as well as actors, people who worked backstage and front of house in theatres; benefits included financial help when ill, and a modest but decent burial. As a burial site for deceased actors and their relatives he chose the London Necropolis at Woking in Surrey, and in 1857 acquired an acre of ground there, now called the Actors' Acre, for the association.

He played a part in establishing the Royal Dramatic College, a retirement home for actors: this ambitious project, which originated in 1858, was supported by Charles Dickens and William Makepeace Thackeray. In 1860, land was purchased from the London Necropolis Company in Woking for the building, and the college was opened a few years later. Anson was Secretary of the college. By 1870 the college was in need of funds, and later closed; the building was sold in 1884.

John Anson died in February 1881; he was buried in the Actors' Acre (Plot 118) at the London Necropolis (Brookwood Cemetery).
