= Anson =

Anson may refer to:

== People ==
- Anson (name), a given name and surname
  - Anson family, a British aristocratic family with the surname

== Places ==
=== US ===
- Anson, Indiana
- Anson, Kansas
- Anson, Maine
  - Anson (CDP), Maine
- Anson, Missouri
- Anson, Texas
- Anson, Wisconsin
  - Anson (community), Wisconsin
- Anson County, North Carolina

=== Malaysia ===
- Teluk Anson, former name for the town Teluk Intan in Perak, Malaysia

=== Singapore ===
- Anson, Singapore

== Other uses ==
- Anson Engine Museum, a museum based in Poynton, England
- HMS Anson, eight ships or submarines of the Royal Navy
- Avro Anson, a World War II aircraft of the Royal Air Force
- Anson Cars, a defunct racing car constructor

== See also ==
- Hanson (disambiguation)
