= Colwich, Staffordshire =

Civil parish and village in England

Coordinates: 52.787526°N 1.980608°W

Colwich
- Area: 28.62 km^{2} (11.05 sq mi)
- Population: 4,528 (2011 census)
  - Density: 158/km^{2} (410/sq mi)
- District: Stafford
- Shire county: Staffordshire
- Region: West Midlands
- Country: England
- Sovereign state: United Kingdom
- Post town: Stafford
- Postcode district: ST17
- Police: Staffordshire
- Fire: Staffordshire
- Ambulance: West Midlands
- UK Parliament: Stone, Great Wyrley and Penkridge

Colwich is a civil parish and village in Staffordshire, England. It is situated off the A51 road, about 3 miles (5 km) north-west of Rugeley and 7 miles (11 km) south-east of Stafford. It lies principally on the north-east bank of the River Trent, near Wolseley Bridge and just north of The Chase. The parish comprises about 2,862 hectares (28.62 km^{2}) of land in the villages and hamlets of Colwich, Great Haywood, Little Haywood, Moreton, Bishton and Wolseley Bridge.

== Etymology ==
The name Colwich comes from the Old English for 'Charcoal specialised-farm', or perhaps 'Cola's specialised farm'

== Landmarks ==
=== Shugborough Hall ===
Shugborough Hall was the ancestral home of the Ansons, earls of Lichfield, four miles (6 km) NW by W of Rugeley. The estate was purchased by William Anson in the early 17th century and is now in the care of the National Trust.

=== St Michael and All Angels ===
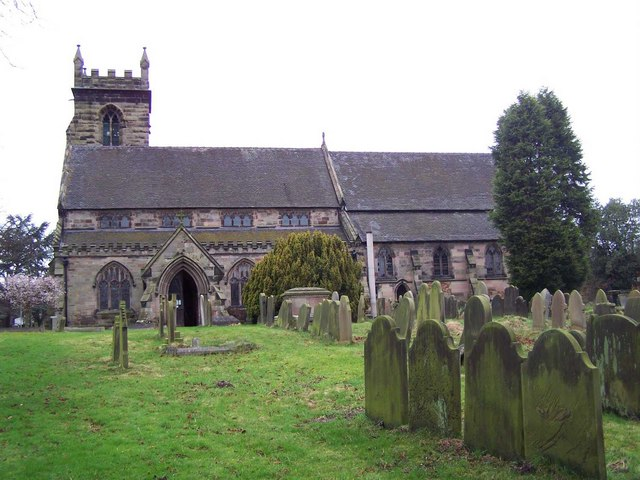
St Michael and All Angels, Colwich

St Michael and All Angels serves as the parish church of Colwich and belongs to the Diocese of Lichfield. It is a grade II* listed building and the centre of the old parish of Colwich, which was reduced in size twice when the parish of Hixon was established in 1848 and again when the parish of Great Haywood was formed in 1854. The exact date when the church was first built is unknown, but from the style of the architecture it may have been sometime in the late 14th century. A major renovation was carried out by the Victorians between 1852 and 1857. The church has a fine set of choir stalls and a reredos of angels by local sculptor Samuel Peploe Wood.

Inside the church are many tombs, wall tablets and other memorials connected with the landed gentry in the parish, including the Wolseley Baronets and the Ansons of Shugborough Hall, earls of Lichfield, many of whom are buried in the church. A tablet commemorates Field Marshal Garnet Wolseley, 1st Viscount Wolseley, KP, GCB, OM, GCMG, VD, PC (1833–1913), buried in the crypt of St Paul's Cathedral, London. The Anson family vault is located underneath the organ loft, formerly the private gallery of the owners of Shugborough Hall. It is accessed through an upright door that is normally concealed behind the panelling of the choir stalls, and neither visible nor accessible to the public. The vault itself is a small, almost square room. Inside there are three niches for coffins opposite the access door, and twelve openings for coffins in each side wall. 15 bodies are currently interred here, including the 1st Earl of Lichfield, Admiral Lord Anson, and his wife. After 1854, when the parish of Great Haywood was formed, the Earls of Lichfield and other Ansons of Shugborough Hall were buried there at St Stephen's Church until the 5th Earl decided to return to the vault at St Michael and All Angels and whose lead-lined coffin was placed there after his death in 2005. In the churchyard is the grave of Adelbert Anson, first Bishop of Qu’Appelle, and also a large and elaborate memorial cross carved in 1866 by Samuel Peploe Wood to his brother, painter Thomas Peploe Wood and other members of his family.

=== Colwich Abbey ===
The village is noted for Saint Mary's Abbey, a community of Roman Catholic nuns of the English Benedictine Congregation founded in 1623 at Cambrai in the Spanish Netherlands. In 1836 the community, having been expelled from France during the French Revolution, finally settled at The Mount, Colwich, where they established the present house, raised to the rank of an abbey in 1928.

=== Wolseley Centre ===
The Wolseley Centre, south-east of the village, is the headquarters of the Staffordshire Wildlife Trust. There is a visitor centre, and a nature reserve of 26 acres (11 ha). The site of the nature reserve was formerly the grounds of Wolseley Hall, demolished in 1966. The estate was the home of the Wolseley family from the 11th century.

=== Bishton Hall ===
Bishton Hall is an 18th-century Grade II* listed manor house on Bellamour Lane. Formerly used as a school, it is now an auction house.

== Railways ==
The Trent Valley Line to Stafford, a part of the West Coast Main Line, runs through the parish; the Stone to Colwich Line, a spur for trains to Stoke-on-Trent and Manchester Piccadilly, diverges at Colwich Junction. The junction was the location of the Colwich rail crash in 1986, where two InterCity services collided.

There were formerly two railway stations in the parish: Colwich, at the location of the junction, and Great Haywood on the line to Stone.

== Notable people ==
In addition to the members of the aristocracy referred to in earlier sections, the following are known to have connections with Colwich:

- George Hodson (1788–1855): Archdeacon of Stafford 1829-1855 and vicar of St Michael & All Angels, Colwich 1828–51
- Samuel Peploe Wood (1827 in Gt Haywood – 1873 in Colwich): an English sculptor and painter
- Thomas Peploe Wood (1817–1845): an English painter
- Edward Pereira (1866 in Colwich – 1939): an English priest and schoolmaster, and a cricketer who played first-class cricket for Warwickshire and the Marylebone Cricket Club (MCC)
- Dennis Izon (1907 in Colwich – 1967): an English footballer who played professionally for Port Vale between 1928 and 1932

== Twin towns ==
For over 30 years, Colwich and the Haywoods have been twinned with:

- Rimbach, Odenwald, Hesse, Germany

== See also ==
- Listed buildings in Colwich, Staffordshire
