= Colwich =

Colwich may refer to:

- Colwich, Kansas, United States
- Colwich, Staffordshire, England
  - Colwich rail crash
