= Quadruple-track railway =

Line containing four paths for trains

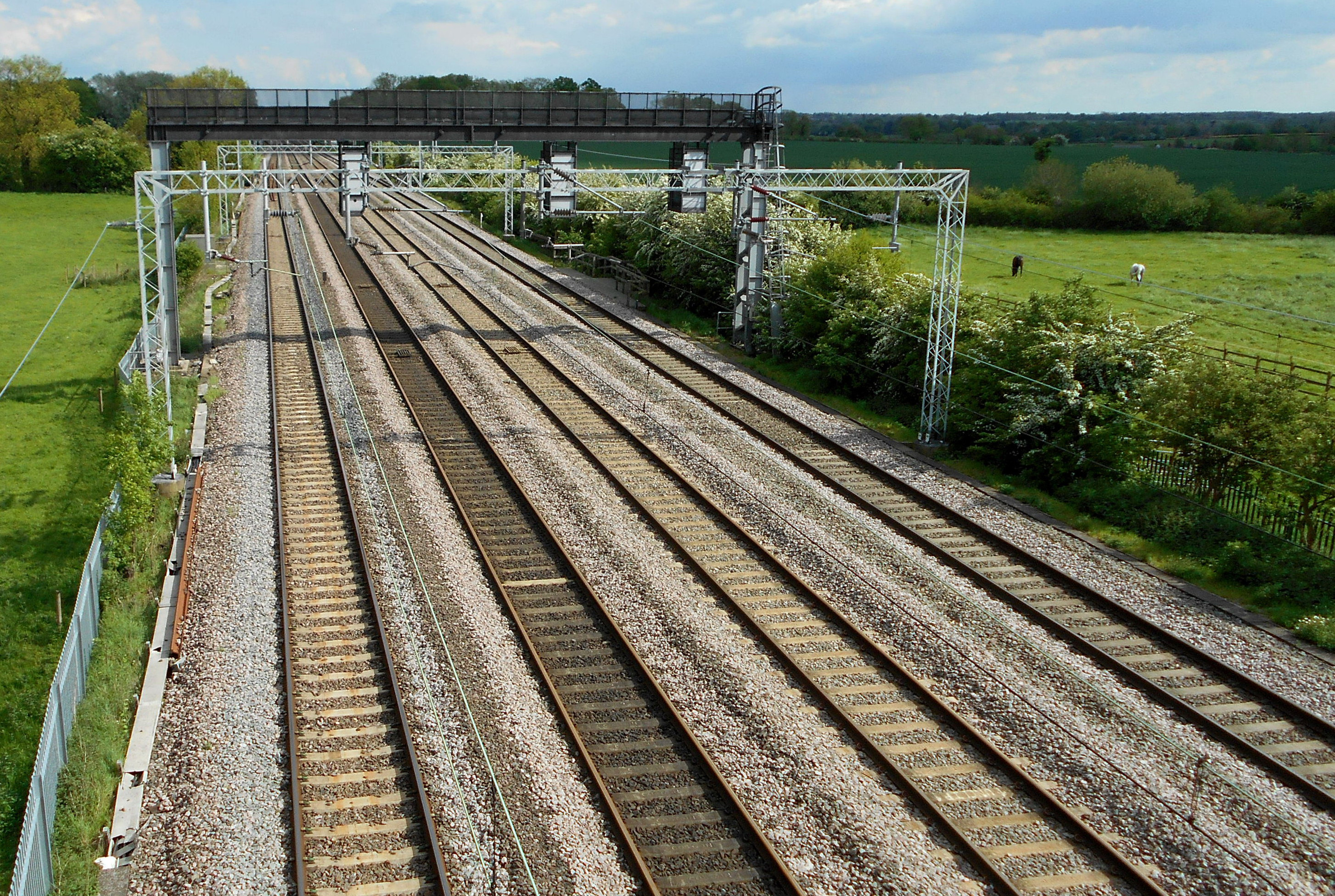
Quadruple track section of the West Coast Main Line, England

A quadruple-track railway (also known as a four-track railway) is a railway line consisting of four parallel tracks with two tracks used in each direction. Quadruple-track railways can handle large amounts of traffic, and so are used on very busy routes or sections. Such conversion is referred to as "quadruplication".

A railway line with six parallel tracks, or a sextuple-track railway, has three tracks in each direction. The corresponding term is "sextuplication".

There are also instances of railway lines or sections with eight tracks, and cases with three or five tracks. All experience similar upsides and downsides.

== Advantages ==
- Quadruple track can carry a larger amount of traffic, and through scheduling techniques like express trains can actually allow for more than twice the capacity of a double-track corridor. It is often seen around large metropolises or on busy inter-city corridors, with the most extensive urban usage seen on the New York City Subway.
- On quadruple track, faster trains can overtake slower ones, and so quadrupling allows all trains to reach their maximum speed. For example, high-speed rail with a 200 km/h average speed and commuter rail with a 60 km/h average can co-exist on quadruple tracks without interrupting each other.
- Maintenance and engineering work are easier on tracks in quadruple line with little resulting delay because standard double-track service can continue even if the other two double tracks are halted during the work.
- Quadruple track lines generally benefit from economies of scale in many other facets due to their larger capacities, from construction, operation, maintenance, storage, and services. Quad-track rail offers a cost-efficient model for high capacity rail service corridors.

== Disadvantages ==
- Quadruple tracking costs more per mile, as it requires more materials and increased land acquisition costs. The required right-of-way is naturally wider, while interchanges and signaling become more complex, and track switching more frequent. This also applies to tunnelling and bridge costs.
- Maintenance costs are higher and often more complex, as there may be more switches on the track than on a two-track line, to allow moving between each of the 4 tracks.
- In order to maintain high speeds, grade separations are commonly required.

== Operation ==
In quadruple track, trains are sorted in various ways in order to make maximum use of track capacity. These can include one or a combination of:

- Sorting by speed

A faster express line and a stopping local line are separated, with each having a separate pair of tracks. Construction of new double tracks dedicated to high-speed rail alongside existing conventional double track used by regional and local passenger trains and freight trains is a form of quadruple track. It increases the capacity of that route significantly, and allows for significant increases in inter-city high-speed train frequency with reduced travel times.

- Sorting by distance

Long-distance inter-city rail and freight trains are separated from short distance commuter rail. This helps to prevent delays on one service affecting the other, and is commonly seen in metropolitan areas. Quadrupling may be necessary when a new commuter rail service begins to operate on an existing line. Sometimes the local trains have separate technology, such as electrical system or signalling, which requires strict separation, for example in Berlin or Copenhagen.

- Sorting by destination

When a quadruple-track line divides to different destinations part way along, trains need to be sorted by their destination.

- Sorting by passenger/ freight

Passenger trains and freight trains can be separated with each different track.

A variation of this can be found on the quadruple track section of the Main Northern line in New South Wales between Waratah and Maitland where one pair of tracks are used exclusively for coal trains and the other pair are used for passenger trains and general freight. A similar process, but with all intercity and commuter passenger trains on the outer tracks and thru-freight trains on the inner tracks, was done by the Pennsylvania Railroad on its New York–Washington and Philadelphia–Pittsburgh mainlines prior to the takeover of operations by Amtrak and Conrail (and later Norfolk Southern). This is somewhat still done to this day by NS, CSX, and Conrail Shared Assets trains on Amtrak-owned trackage in the Philadelphia area. Future passenger and freight-separated track pairs are planned by the state of Virginia on the corridor between Washington, D.C. and Richmond, Virginia, and by California High-Speed Rail between Los Angeles and Fullerton, California.

- Other modes

Two separate double-track lines in proximity to each other, e.g., two double-track lines along opposite sides of a river, can operate as a quadruple track line. Examples of this can be found in Rhone in France and Rhine in Germany.

== Layouts ==
As it can be seen from the pictures below in the Gallery of diagrams, the four tracks can be paired either by direction (slow and fast in each pair) or by purpose (speed or direction in each pair). Pairing by direction allows the railway to interface to a double track more easily. With fast trains in centre, local stations can be on the outside, eliminating staircases for half the passengers. With slow trains in centre or when pairing by speed there can be a common platform for local trains with one staircase and one ticket booth.

Sometimes two of the tracks go more straight and with a little distance from the two other. This is a design decision when widening a double track section, and allows higher speed on the faster tracks.

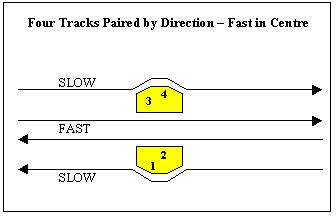

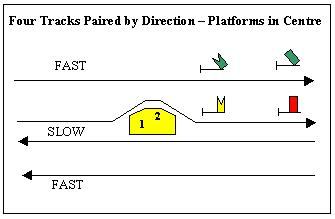

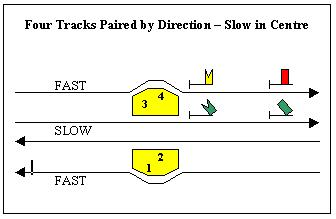

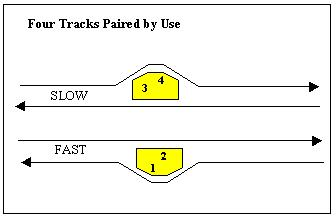

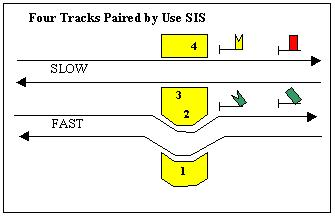

== Examples ==
=== Belgium ===
Several lines radiating from Brussels are quadrupled, for instance the Ghent-Ostend line as far as Essene-Lombeek. Further quadrupling has recently been carried out as part of the development of the Brussels Regional Express Network. The building of high-speed lines has also led to quadrupling - for instance the HSL 2 high-speed line between Brussels and Cologne runs inside the local lines as far as Leuven. Meanwhile since 1934 Brussels and Antwerp have been connected by two separate pairs of double track. Fast trains normally use line 25, while line 27 serves slow trains. In places they run parallel, but at times diverge and cross over each other.

=== Denmark ===
There are two places in Denmark with four tracks:

- Between Klampenborg and Høje Taastrup, through Copenhagen, Denmark, there are four tracks; two are for the separated S-trains and two for mainline trains; where the two tracks closest to Copenhagen (the oldest and central parts of Copenhagen) are reserved for S-trains (on much the lines this is the Northern and Western two tracks).
- Also between Høje Taastrup and Roskilde, where the two center tracks are for InterCity, long distance commuter trains (further than Roskilde or Ringsted), while the outer two tracks are for commuter trains to/from Ringsted or Holbæk. It has been suggested that the S-trains should continue from Høje Taastrup to Roskilde, but this plan was abandoned; partly due to Roskilde refusing the offer for fear they would become a suburb of Copenhagen, and partly due to construction costs which would exceed the advantages.

=== Finland ===
- Helsinki–Riihimäki railway has four tracks between Helsinki Central Station and Kerava railway station
- Helsinki-Turku railway has four tracks between Helsinki Central Station and Leppävaara station

=== Germany ===
By definition German railway lines have one or two tracks. Where more tracks are running parallel to each other, they are considered two or more separate lines. Such routes include:

- The Berlin Stadtbahn, Germany, has four tracks. Two are for the separated S-Bahn and two for mainline trains.
- The 112 km long Hamm–Minden railway between Hamm and Minden in Germany is completely quadruple-track with separate tracks for freight and passenger trains.
- The 50 km long railway from Rastatt to Offenburg in Germany has four tracks.
- The Hohenzollern Bridge, with six tracks
- The line from Munich to Augsburg has four tracks and near Munich even more.

=== Ireland ===
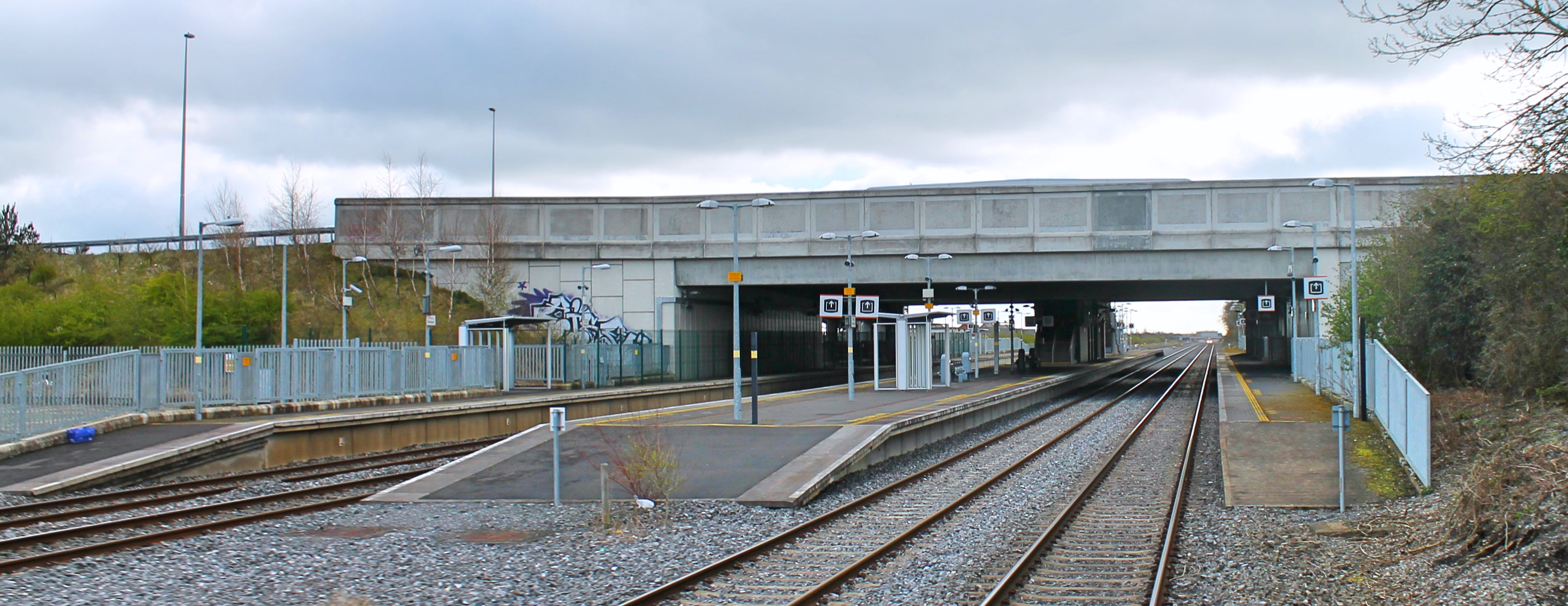
Quadrupled section of the Dublin Suburban Rail system

- In Ireland, the busiest section of railway in the country, on the approach to Dublin's Heuston station from Hazelhatch & Celbridge was quadrupled in 2009.

=== Italy ===
- The Rome–Naples high-speed railway and the Rome–Sulmona–Pescara railway in Italy combine to form a quadruple track section between Roma Prenestina railway station and Salone railway station.
- The Milan-Chasso railway and the Milan-Lecco railway run parallel in a quadruple track section from Milan to Monza.
- The main section of Ferrovie Nord Milano line between Milan and Saronno in Italy. Outer regional trains are segregated from the inner suburban trains.

=== Netherlands ===
- The Amsterdam–Rotterdam railway between Leiden via Den Haag HS to Rijswijk was quadrupled between 1987 and 1996. As of 2023, work is underway to extend this to Delft, although the last few kilometers to Schiedam, near Rotterdam are to remain double track.
- The Amsterdam–Arnhem railway between Amsterdam Bijlmer and Utrecht Centraal has been quadrupled between 1999 and 2008.
- The Breda–Eindhoven railway between Boxtel and Eindhoven was quadrupled between 1998 and 2002 but operates as two parallel double track lines.
- The Breda–Rotterdam railway between Rotterdam and Dordrecht has been quadrupled.

=== Norway ===
There are some quadruple-track railways in the Oslo region. They are mostly two double tracks with slightly different routes, one older for local trains, and one newer mostly in tunnels for high-speed and regional trains.

- Drammen Line and Asker Line between Asker and Lysaker.
- Trunk Line and Gardermoen Line between Oslo and Lillestrøm.
- Østfold Line and Follo Line between Oslo and Ski.

=== Portugal ===
- The suburban railway axis between Agualva-Cacém and Alverca in the Lisbon Metropolitan Area, excluding a small section between Roma-Areeiro and Braço de Prata, which will be quadruplicated by 2030. This is part of the Linha de Sintra, Linha da Cintura and Linha do Norte, which are Portugal's busiest railway lines by number of passengers and trains. The former two are suburban lines in Lisbon; while the latter is the long-distance route to Porto, with Intercity and High-Speed services. A set of tracks is for the suburban services and the other two are for long-distance trains.

=== Serbia ===
- Section between Batajnica and Stara Pazova, around 15 km long, on Belgrade–Šid and Belgrade–Subotica railways is quadruplicated from 2022. Two inner tracks are used by passenger trains and have maximum speed 200 km/h while two outer tracks are used for freight trains.

=== Sweden ===
- All of the mainline railway through Stockholm County (between Järna and Myrbacken north of Märsta, 83 km or 52 mi) has four tracks, sometimes having two routes. There are plans to widen Stockholm–Bålsta and Myrbacken–Uppsala to quadruple track with parts finished or under construction. After this, the Stockholm commuter rail would have its own tracks everywhere. The Swedish Transport Administration is currently planning on extending the quadruple track from a few kilometers north off Upplands Väsby to Uppsala Central Station within the upcoming decade. When having four tracks the local trans go in the middle, which allows a common ticket booth per station.
- The section between Malmö and Arlöv on the Southern Main Line has four tracks, and an extension to Lund was finished in 2024. It will have local stations on the outside tracks, because staffed ticket booths are not used here.

=== Switzerland ===
- The 120 km long railway from Zürich to Olten contains long quadruple track sections from Zürich to Killwangen-Spreitenbach (Zürich–Baden line) and from Rupperswil to Aarau (Heitersberg line), currently being extended to Olten (Olten–Aarau line).

=== United Kingdom ===
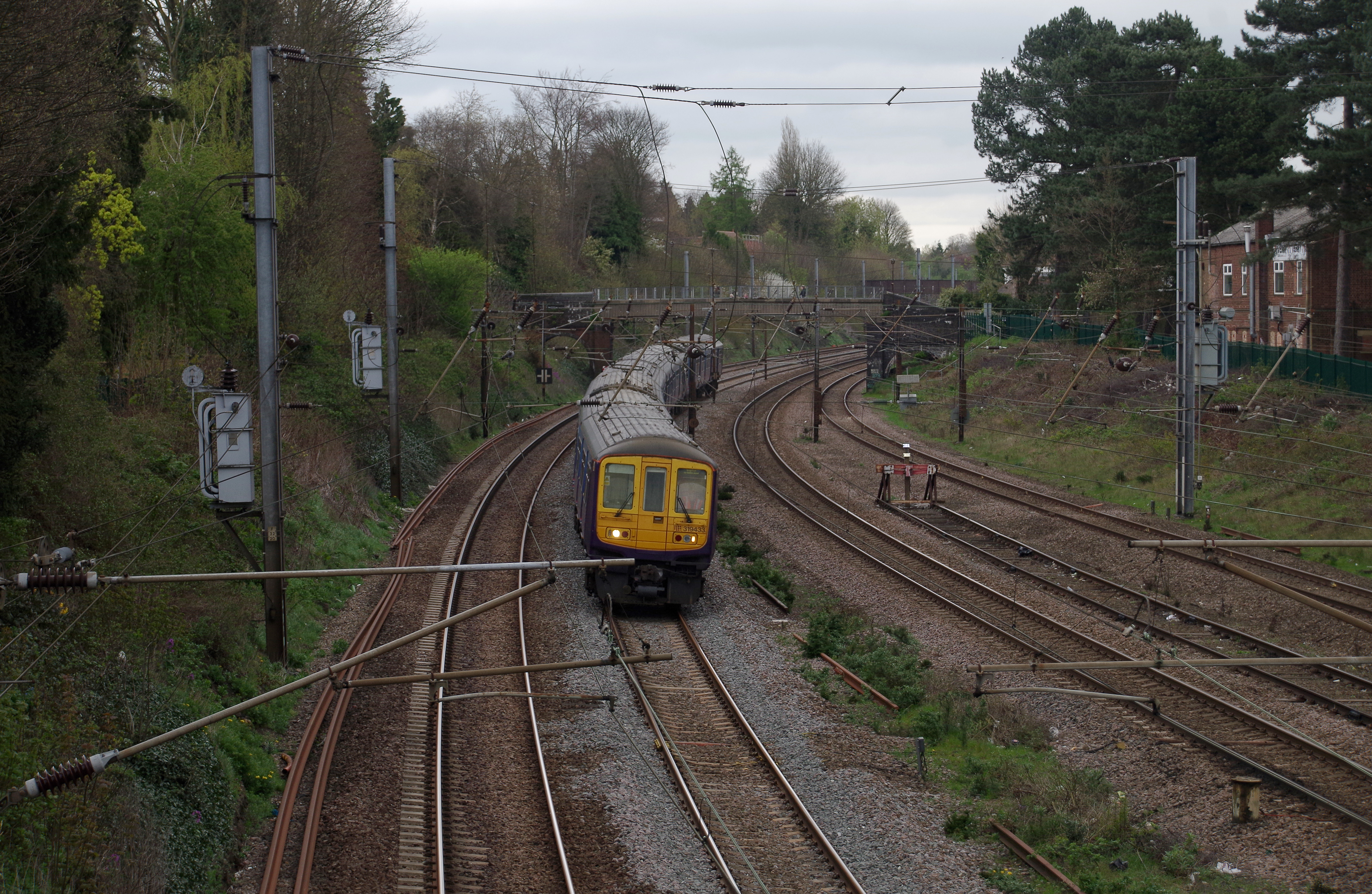
Quadruple track section of the Midland Main Line, England

Line	Stretch	Length	Paired by
Midland Main Line	London St Pancras – Kettering	74 miles (119 km)	Speed
West Coast Main Line	London Euston – Roade	60 miles (97 km)	Speed
East Coast Main Line	London King's Cross – Huntingdon	59 miles (95 km)	Direction
Great Western Main Line	London Paddington – Didcot	53 miles (85 km)	Speed
South Western Main Line	Durnsford Road – Worting Junction	44 miles (71 km)	Direction
West Coast Main Line	Nuneaton – Colwich Junction	32 miles (51 km)	Direction
Brighton Main Line	London Victoria – Balcombe Tunnel Jct.	32 miles (51 km)	Speed
East Coast Main Line	York Skelton – Northallerton Longlands	28 miles (45 km)	Direction
West Coast Main Line	Milford & Brocton – Crewe	27 miles (43 km)	Speed
East Coast Main Line	Fletton – Stoke Tunnel	25 miles (40 km)	Direction
South Wales Main Line	Severn Tunnel Junction – Ninian Park	23 miles (37 km)	
Great Eastern Main Line	London Liverpool Street – Shenfield	20 miles (32 km)	Speed
Midland Main Line	Syston – Trent Junction	16 miles (26 km)	Speed
London, Tilbury & Southend line District line	Bromley-by-Bow – Upminster	12 miles (19 km)	Speed
South Eastern Main Line	London Bridge – Orpington	12 miles (19 km)	Speed
Cross Country Route; East Coast Main Line	Church Fenton – York Holgate	10 miles (16 km)	Speed
Brighton Main Line	London Bridge – Cottage Junction	10 miles (16 km)	Direction
West Coast Main Line	Crewe – Winsford	8 miles (13 km)	Direction
West Coast Main Line	Wavertree – Ditton Junction	8 miles (13 km)	Pax./Freight
West Coast Main Line	Euxton Balshaw Lane – Preston Fylde Jn.	8 miles (13 km)	Speed
Chatham Main Line	Shortlands – Swanley	8 miles (13 km)	Destination
Crewe–Manchester line	Manchester Piccadilly – Adswood Road	7 miles (11 km)	Direction
Cross Country Route	Saltley – Water Orton	6 miles (9.7 km)	Direction
South Western Main Line	London Waterloo – Durnsford Road	6 miles (9.7 km)	Direction
Metropolitan line	Harrow-on-the-Hill – Moor Park	6 miles (9.7 km)	Speed
West Coast Main Line	Hillmorton Junction – Brinklow	6 miles (9.7 km)	Direction
West Coast Main Line	Golborne South – Wigan Springs Branch	5 miles (8.0 km)	Speed
Piccadilly line District line	Barons Court – Northfields	5 miles (8.0 km)	Direction
Metropolitan line Jubilee line	Finchley Road – Wembley Park	5 miles (8.0 km)	Direction
Great Western Main Line	Bristol Temple Meads – Filton Junction	5 miles (8.0 km)	Speed
Midland Main Line	Clay Cross – Chesterfield (Tapton)	5 miles (8.0 km)	Pax./Freight
Waterloo–Reading line	Queenstown Road – Barnes	4 miles (6.4 km)	Direction
East Coast Main Line	Loversall Carr – Doncaster	4 miles (6.4 km)	Direction
West Coast Main Line	Warrington Bank Quay – Winwick Quay	4 miles (6.4 km)	Direction
West Coast Main Line	Rutherglen – Glasgow Central	4 miles (6.4 km)	Speed
Cross Country Route; Cross-City Line	Kings Norton – Longbridge	4 miles (6.4 km)	Direction
South London line	Factory Junction – Peckham Rye	3 miles (4.8 km)	Destination
Lea Valley lines	London Liverpool Street – Hackney Downs	3 miles (4.8 km)	Speed
Metropolitan line	Wembley Park – Harrow-on-the-Hill	3 miles (4.8 km)	Direction
East Coast Main Line	Birtley – Low Fell, Gateshead	2 miles (3.2 km)	Pax./Freight
Liverpool–Manchester line West Coast Main Line	Liverpool Lime Street – Edge Hill	2 miles (3.2 km)	Destination
South Eastern Main Line	London Charing Cross – Metropolitan Jn.	1 mile (1.6 km)	Destination
South Western Main Line	Southampton Central – Millbrook	1 mile (1.6 km)	Direction
North London line	Highbury & Islington – Dalston Kingsland	1 mile (1.6 km)	Destination

=== Argentina ===
- A quadruple set of tracks exists in the Roca Line railway in Greater Buenos Aires between Constitución station and Temperley. All four tracks are used by commuter trains, 2 tracks are used for direct service and the other 2 for regular service.

=== Mexico ===
- As of 2023, a quadruple set of tracks exists in Mexico City and Estado de México. 2 tracks are used by the Tren Suburbano. 2 tracks are for freight operated by Ferrovalle.

=== United States ===
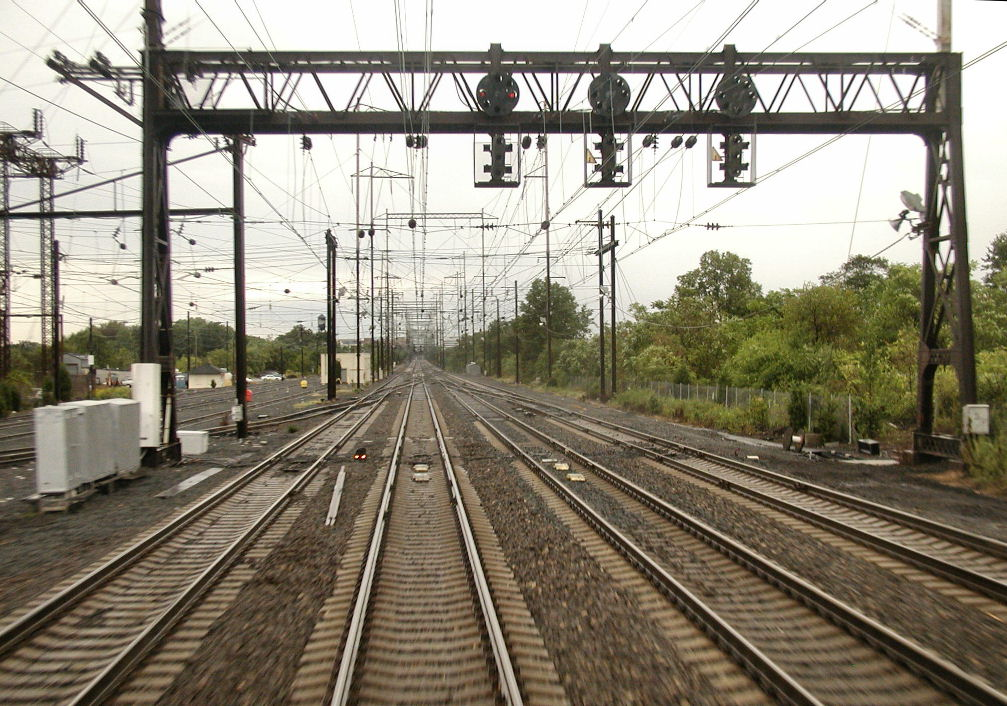
4-track section of Amtrak's Northeast Corridor in New Jersey

==== New York and New Jersey ====
- Many lines of the New York City Subway are quadrupled – one of the few rapid transit systems in the United States to have extensive duplication. Express and local trains are separated on different sets of tracks.
- Much of Amtrak's Northeast Corridor from Newark, Delaware, to New Haven, Connecticut, is a four-track line.
  - One exception is the segment between New Rochelle and the Sunnyside Yard in Queens, where the Northeast Corridor occupies two tracks, although in its southern portion it is alongside one or two freight tracks. The right-of-way from Woodside, Queens, over the Hell Gate Bridge to the Oak Point Link junction is in total three-tracked, although it was historically four-tracked before one of the freight tracks was lifted. The bridge was also designed for an additional track on each side of the main arch for a trolley line.
  - Another exception is the portion between Newark Penn Station and New York Penn Station, which contains the two-track Sawtooth Bridges, Portal Bridge, and North River Tunnels.
- The Metro-North Railroad's main trunk and New Haven Line leading north from Grand Central Terminal is four-tracked; it joins with the Northeast Corridor (above) at New Rochelle which remains four-tracked until New Haven Union Station.
- The Long Island Rail Road's Main Line is at least four-tracked from its East River Tunnels portal in Long Island City until the Hempstead Branch diverges from it just beyond the Floral Park station. The Main Line then remains three-tracked until just beyond the Hicksville station.
- The New York Central's Water Level Route across upstate New York was four-tracked in the majority as early as 1876, claiming to be the earliest 4-tracked steel main. This was extended to Buffalo by 1936. Financial troubles and changing traffic patterns caused this to be downgraded to a double track by 1975. However a southern portion used by the Metro-North Railroad Hudson Line features quadruplicated tracks for most of its length between Croton-Harmon and Spuyten Duyvil.
- The Erie Lackawanna Railway had a four-track mainline on the former Erie Railroad, from its Pavonia Terminal in Jersey City to Suffern yard in Rockland County, New York. This allowed the separation of freight and commuter trains. The EL Rwy also inherited former Lackawanna four-track Boonton Main Line from Dover, NJ, to Delawanna (Passaic), NJ.
- The Central Railroad of New Jersey had a four-track main from the CNJ Terminal in Jersey City to Phillipsburg, NJ, across from Easton, PA.

==== Pennsylvania ====
- The Pennsylvania Railroad had a four-track mainline carrying freight from Pittsburgh to Harrisburg via the Horseshoe Curve (Pennsylvania). This was how the name Broadway Limited came about from the "Broadway of a 4-track main." Much of the route between Pittsburgh and Paoli has been downgraded to three or two tracks.
- SEPTA's Main Line in Philadelphia is quadruple-tracked from ZOO Interlocking to Wayne Junction. This includes a combination of infrastructure inherited from both the Pennsylvania Railroad and the Reading Company, as well as the Center City Commuter Connection.
- SEPTA's Broad Street Subway is quadruple-tracked between Fern Rock Transit Center and Walnut–Locust, in much the same manner as the New York City Subway. This represents about two-thirds of the line's total length, and the remaining southern end of the line was built to accommodate future quadruple-tracking. Additionally, SEPTA's Market Street Subway is quadruple tracked from 15th Street/City Hall station to just west of 30th Street. SEPTA's subway-surface trolley lines run on the outer tracks, while the L runs on the inner tracks.
- Reading Company's New York Branch between Neshaminy Falls and Yardley station was originally quadruple-tracked before being reduced to three tracks between Neshaminy Falls and Woodbourne station and two tracks between Woodbourne and Yardley. In 2016, the third track between Woodbourne and Yardley was relaid by SEPTA in order to separate SEPTA's West Trenton Line and CSX's Trenton Subdivision.

==== Boston ====
- The Tremont Street Subway, currently operating as the MBTA Green Line, is quadruple tracked between Boylston station and the Park Street station.

==== Chicago area ====
- The BNSF Railway Line in Chicago has a quadruple track section from Union Station to LaVergne.
- The Chicago "L" has a four-track section on the North Side Main Line (Purple, Red, and Brown Lines) between Howard and Armitage.
- In Chicago, the Metra Electric District mainline, South Shore Line, and Amtrak's City of New Orleans and Illini and Saluki run on six tracks (4 electrified, 2 non-electrified) between McCormick Place and 111th Street. After the South Shore Line splits off, The Metra Electric and Amtrak lines continue to run on four tracks until the Metra Electric terminates at University Park.
- Also in Chicago, the Milwaukee Road's Chicago Terminal Division was quadruple-tracked between Chicago Union Station and Bensenville. This line has since been reduced to three tracks.

==== California ====
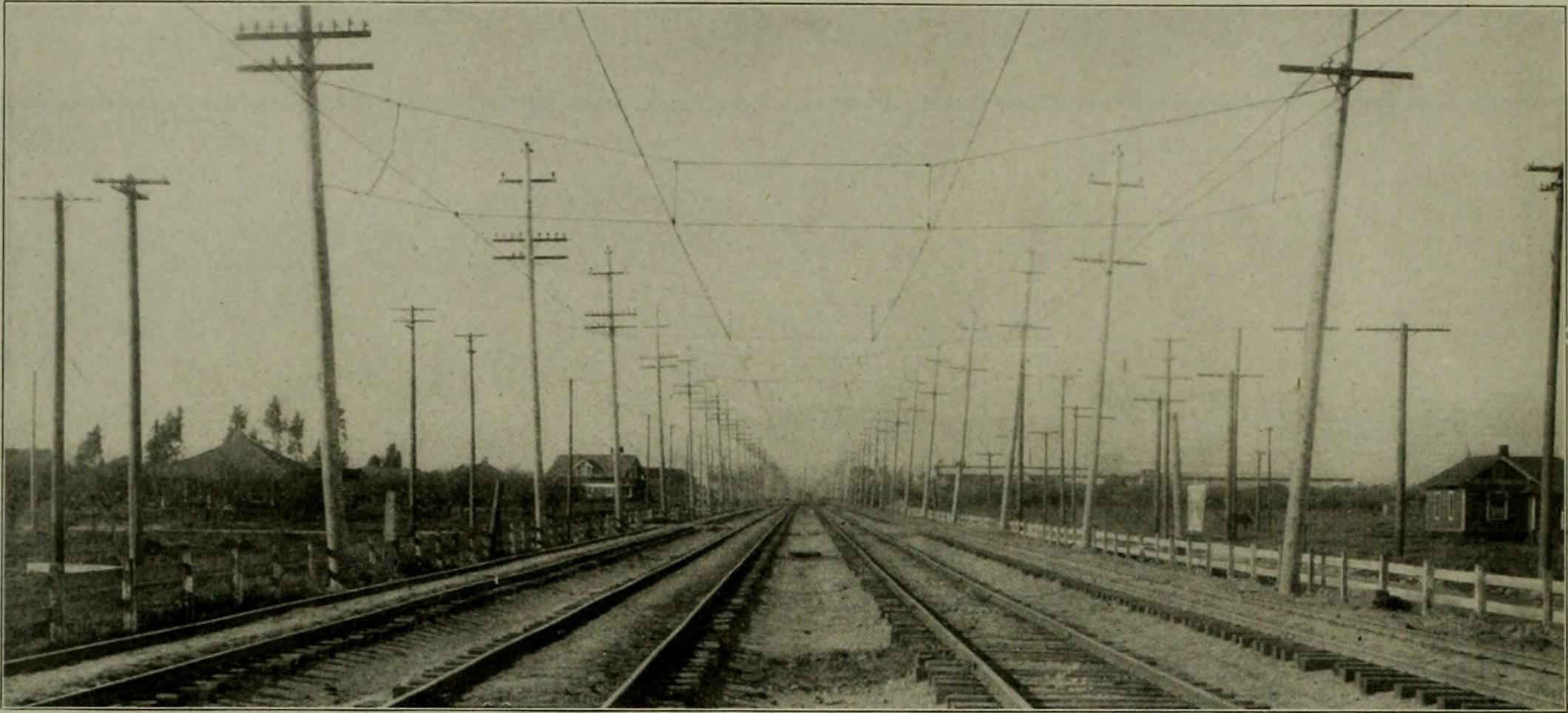
The four tracks of the Pacific Electric Watts Line in Los Angeles, 1906

- Market Street in San Francisco had quadruple track streetcars for much of its length in the early 1900s – two tracks operated by United Railroads of San Francisco and two tracks operated by the San Francisco Municipal Railway (Muni). As the streetcar system was acquired by the government and was modernized to light rail, capacity was maintained by tunneling an additional right-of-way for Muni vehicles parallel, under the surface. The Market Street subway's two subterranean levels are both double-tracked, and the (retained) double-tracked surface section runs heritage trolley cars for a total of six tracks in the same thoroughfare. The surface and upper level are laid at standard gauge and maintained by the San Francisco Municipal Transportation Agency while the lower level is Indian gauge track operated by Bay Area Rapid Transit.
- Bay Area Rapid Transit is quadruple tracked for a short section at the approaches to and at MacArthur station in Oakland, California. The transit system had plans that called for Market Street subway to be fully quadruple tracked to their unique operational specifications, with express trains running on a separate level than local trains; the final system was reconfigured due to budget constraints.
- The Pacific Electric Watts Line was the interurban system's quadruple-tracked southern trunk, running from Downtown Los Angeles to Watts. After the line's discontinuance in 1958, two tracks were maintained for freight rail while two were converted to light rail for the Los Angeles Metro Rail Blue Line.

=== China ===
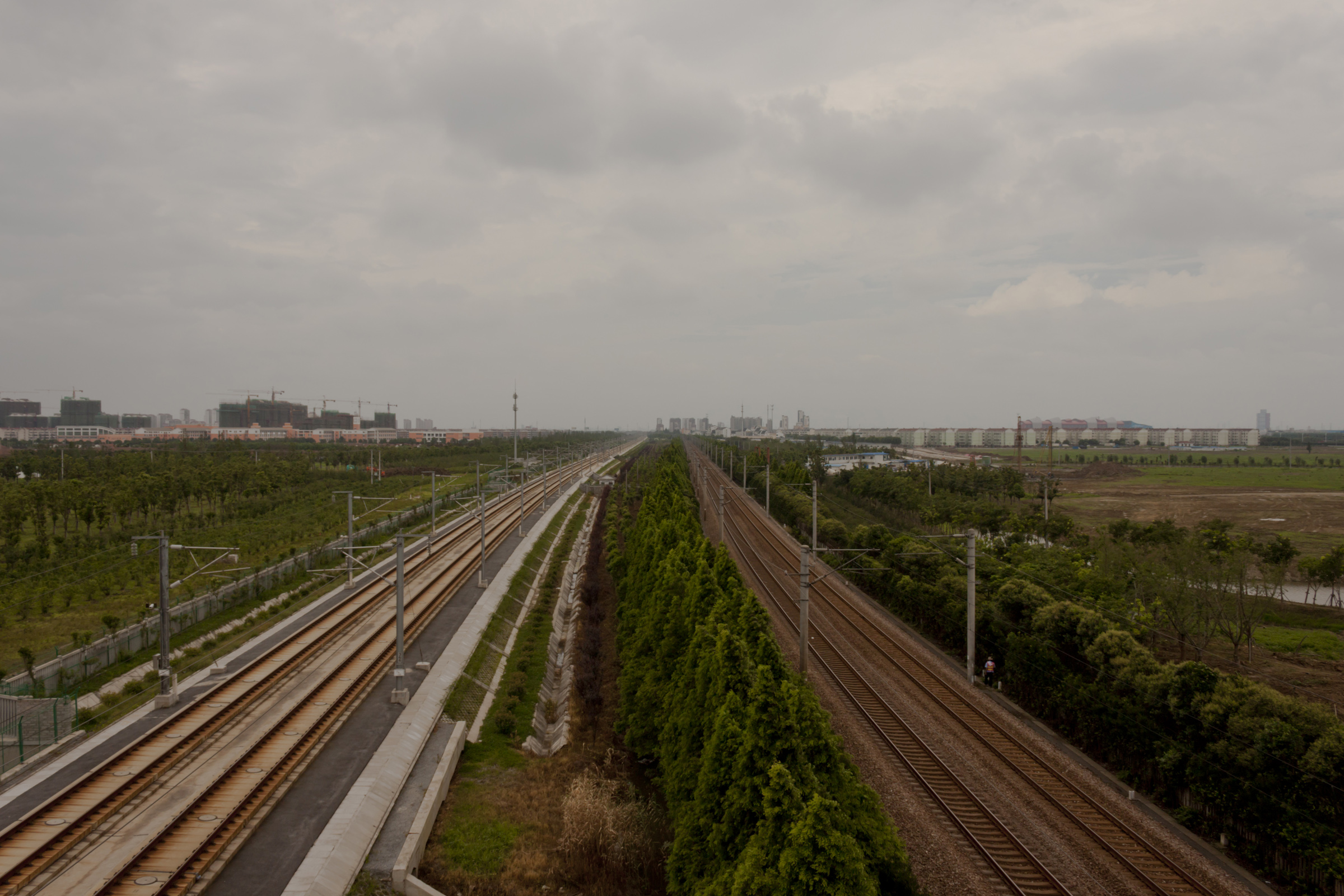
Huning Lines

- Beijing–Baotou Railway is quadruplicated in 2012 between Hohhot East and Baotou railway station with one pair of tracks for conventional services of the Beijing–Baotou Railway and a pair for high speed trains that continue into the Zhangjiakou–Hohhot High-Speed Railway.
- The Guangzhou–Shenzhen Railway is quadruplicated in 2007 for its entire length separating high-speed passenger with freight and conventional passenger services. It is the first railway in China to do so. The third track was added in 2000, but the mixing of services heading in one direction caused disruption in schedules, so the fourth track was built allowing for complete separation.
- The Shanghai–Nanjing Intercity Railway follows the same alignment to the slower conventional Nanjing–Shanghai Railway between Zhenjiang and Suzhou. In Kunshan it follows the Beijing–Shanghai High-Speed Railway effectively making it a 4-track corridor for a majority of its length.
- The Jiaozhou-Jinan Passenger Dedicated Line shares the same alignment to the slower conventional Jiaozhou–Jinan Railway, effectively making the Jiaoji Line as a quadruple track corridor. This is not to be confused with the Qingdao–Jinan High-Speed Railway which is another parallel railway running on a new alignment several kilometers north of the Jiaoji Line.
- The Datong–Xi'an Passenger Railway and the Zhengzhou–Xi'an High-Speed Railway parallel each other between Xi'an and Weinan with a pair of tracks for each line.
- The Nanning–Guangzhou High-Speed Railway and Guiyang–Guangzhou High-Speed Railway run beside each other between Guangzhou and Dinghu with a pair of tracks for each line.
- The Nanning–Guangzhou High-Speed Railway and Liuzhou–Nanning Intercity Railway run beside each other between Nanning and Binyang with a pair of tracks for each line.
- Beijing–Kowloon Railway (Nanchang–Jiujiang section) / Nanchang–Jiujiang Intercity Railway. Conventional long-distance trains run on both lines.
- The Chongqing–Wanzhou Intercity Railway runs parallel to the Chongqing−Lichuan Railway between Chongqing North railway station and Changshou North railway station with a pair of tracks for each line.
- The Beijing–Tianjin intercity railway forms a 4-track corridor with the Beijing–Shanghai Railway between Wuqing railway station and Tianjin North Station then continuing to follow the Tianjin–Shanhaiguan Railway between Tianjin North Station and Tanggu railway station.
- The Shijiazhuang–Jinan high-speed railway and the Beijing–Shanghai high-speed railway parallel each other between Jinan West railway station and Dezhou East railway station with a pair of tracks for each line.
- The Beijing–Shanghai high-speed railway runs beside the older Beijing–Shanghai Railway between Beijing South railway station and Langfang railway station with a pair of tracks for each line.
- The Xian-Chengdu High Speed Railway runs beside the older Baoji–Chengdu Railway between Deyang and Guanghan.
- The Harbin–Qiqihar intercity railway runs beside the older Harbin–Manzhouli railway between Harbin and Houwujiacun.
- The Hangzhou–Huangshan intercity railway runs beside the Hefei–Fuzhou high-speed railway between Huangshan North and Jixi North with a pair of tracks for each line.
- Six tracks run between Hangzhou East and Hangzhou South railway stations.
- The Xiamen–Shenzhen railway runs beside the older Yingtan–Xiamen railway between Jiaomei and Xiamen North.
- The Zhengzhou–Jiaozuo intercity railway runs beside the older Beijing–Guangzhou railway between the New Yellow River Jingguang Railway Bridge to Nanyangzhai railway station with a pair of tracks for each line.
- The Hefei–Bengbu high-speed railway runs beside the Huainan Railway between Hefei railway station and Shuijiahu railway station.
- Four tracks run between Yuci and Taiyuan East railway stations in Taiyuan.
- The Shijiazhuang–Jinan passenger railway runs beside the older Shide Railway between Shijiazhuang and Shijiazhaung East stations.
- Beijing–Kowloon railway and Shangqiu–Hangzhou high-speed railway form a four track corridor between Shangqiu South to Gucheng East railway station.
- Chengdu Metro's Line 1 and Line 18 run adjacent to each other for roughly 20 kilometers, essentially forming a four track subway between Chengdu South Railway Station and Western China International Expo City Station. Line 18 is typically the express route, while Line 1 is the local route.

=== Hong Kong ===
- The Tung Chung line and the Airport Express of the MTR in Hong Kong are quadruplicated between Kowloon and Tsing Yi stations, but share two tracks through the Western Immersed Tube tunnel and between Tsing Yi and Sunny Bay stations and between Sunny Bay station and Tai Ho Wan junction.
- The Tuen Ma line runs parallel to the Tung Chung line and the Airport Express near Nam Cheong station, meaning six tracks running side-by-side, though the three lines serve different destinations and passenger interchange is only possible between Tung Chung line and the Tuen Ma line at Nam Cheong, and out-of-system across the three lines between Austin and Kowloon stations.
- The Tuen Ma line and the Light Rail between Siu Hong and Tuen Mun stations.
- Between Shau Kei Wan and Sheung Wan stations, the Island line of the MTR runs underneath or in close proximity to the Hong Kong Tramway.
- The Ocean Park Cable Car system has two pairs of ropeways.
- Multiple sections on the East Rail line, where Intercity Through Trains may overtake domestic trains on the third or fourth track, as well as an extra pair of tracks near Racecourse station.

=== India ===
- The line between Barddhaman Junction and Sitarampur Junction on Howrah-Delhi line.
- The line between Sealdah and Naihati Junction of Kolkata Suburban Railway shared with expresses.
- The line between Howrah Junction and Santragachhi Junction on Howrah-Chennai line.
- The line between Park Circus and Majerhat Junction of Kolkata Suburban Railway.
- The line between Howrah Junction and Bally in Kolkata Suburban Railway shared with expresses has 5 tracks (1 bidirectional line).
- The line between Dankuni Junction and Chandanpur in Kolkata Suburban Railway shared with expresses.
- The Central Line of Mumbai Suburban Railway, from Chhatrapati Shivaji Maharaj Terminus to Kalyan Junction
- The Western Line of Mumbai Suburban Railway, from Churchgate to Virar.
- The mainline between Ghaziabad Junction and Anand Vihar Terminal.
- The mainline between New Delhi and Palwal on Delhi-Mumbai rail route.
- The South Line, Chennai Suburban between Chennai Beach and Tambaram.
- The West Line, Chennai Suburban between Chennai Central and Arakkonam Junction.
- The mainline between Nagpur and Wardha on the Howrah–Mumbai and Delhi–Chennai intersection.

=== Indonesia ===
- The line between Manggarai and Cikarang on Rajawali-Cikampek line is being quadrupled, with the first section between Jatinegara and Cakung opened on 14 April 2019.

=== Israel ===
- The Coastal Railway between Tel Aviv Central and Herzliya. In 2020 construction started on an NIS 5.5 billion (US$1.5 billion in 2018 dollars) project to extend the 4 track section along about 10 km south from Tel Aviv Central to Tel Aviv HaHagana and from there to the Ganot/Shapirim interchange on the Tel Aviv–Lod Railway. In the future, four tracking of the Coastal Railway is also planned to extend north of Herzliya to Haifa in stages.

=== Japan ===
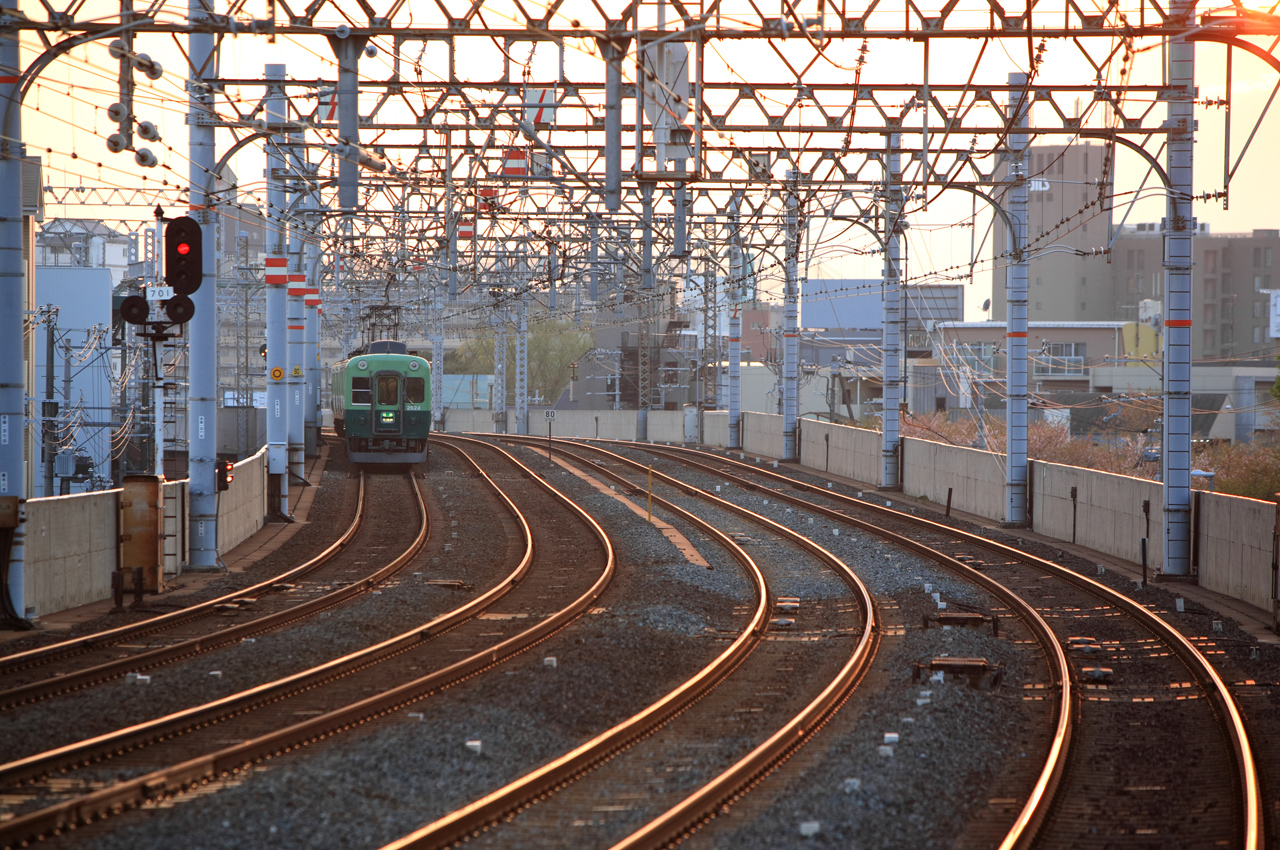
Four track stretch of the Keihan Main Line in Japan

- Hankyu Railway in Osaka has a sextuplicated section between Umeda and Juso stations (2.4 km).
- Keihan Main Line in Osaka is quadruplicated between Temmabashi and Neyagawa Signal Box (~13 km).
- Odakyu Odawara Line in Tokyo is quadruplicated between Noborito and Yoyogi-Uehara Stations.
- Tokyu Toyoko and Meguro Lines in Tokyo run parallel beside each other between Hiyoshi and Den-en-chōfu Stations.
- Seibu Ikebukuro Line in Tokyo is quadruplicated between Shakujii-koen and Sakuradai Stations.
- Tobu Tojo Line in Tokyo is quadruplicated between Wakoshi and Shiki Stations.
- Tobu Skytree Line in Tokyo is quadruplicated between Kita-Koshigaya and Kita-Senju Stations.
- Between Tokyo and Odawara (JR East) 83.9 km is paired by use (not including Shinkansen).
  - Tokyo – Shinagawa 6.8 km: 6 tracks (8 if include Sobu-Yokosuka Line Underground)
  - Shinagawa – Tsurumi 14.9 km: 4 tracks
  - Tsurumi – Yokohama 7.1 km: 6 tracks
  - Yokohama – Totsuka 12.1 km: 4 tracks
  - Totsuka – Ofuna 5.6 km: 6 tracks
  - Ofuna – Odawara 37.4 km: 4 tracks
- Between Tokyo and Omiya (JR East) is paired by use (not including Shinkansen)
  - Tokyo – Akihabara: 6 tracks
  - Akihabara – Ueno: 6 tracks
    - (Tokyo – Ueno 3.6 km)
  - Ueno – Nippori 2.2 km: 10 tracks (2 for Ueno Depot)
  - Nippori – Tabata: 4 tracks
  - Nippori – Oku: 4 tracks
  - Tabata – Akabane: 4 tracks
  - Oku – Akabane: 2 tracks
    - (Nippori – Akabane 7.4 km)
  - Akabane – Omiya 17.1 km: 6 tracks
- Between Kusatsu and Nishi-Akashi (JR West) 120.9 km (not including Shinkansen)
  - Kusatsu – Kyoto 22.2 km is paired by direction: 4 tracks
  - Kyoto – Umekoji – Mukomachi 6.4 km is paired by direction: 5 tracks
  - Mukomachi – Ibaraki 21.8 km is paired by direction: 4 tracks
  - Ibaraki – Suita is paired by use: 6 tracks
  - Suita – Shin-Osaka is paired by use: 8 tracks
  - Shin-Osaka – Osaka – Tsukamoto is paired by direction: 6 tracks
    - (Ibaraki – Osaka 14.6 km)
  - Shin-Osaka – Miyahara – Tsukamoto: 2 tracks
  - Tsukamoto – Hyogo is paired by direction: 4 tracks
  - Hyogo – Takatori is paired by direction: 5 tracks
    - (Osaka – Takatori 38.2 km)
  - Takatori – Nishi-Akashi 17.7 km is paired by use: 4 tracks
- Between Ochanomizu and Mitaka (JR East) 21.5 km is paired by use.
  - Ochanomizu – Yoyogi: 4 tracks
  - Yoyogi – Shinjuku: 8 tracks
  - Shinjuku – Mitaka: 4 tracks
- Between Kinshicho and Chiba (JR East) 34.4 km is paired by use.
  - Kinshicho – Nishi-Chiba: 4 tracks
  - Nishi-Chiba – Chiba: 6 tracks
- Between Ayase and Toride (JR East) 29.7 km: 4 tracks/paired by use
- Between Osaki and Komagome (JR East) about 20 km is paired by use. (see Yamanote line)
  - Osaki – Yoyogi: 4 tracks
  - Yoyogi – Shinjuku: 8 tracks
  - Shinjuku – Komagome: 4 tracks
- Between Souen and Heiwa (JR Hokkaido) about 9 km
  - Souen – Sapporo is paired by use: 3 tracks
  - Sapporo – Heiwa is paired by direction: 4 tracks
- Between Niigata and Kami-Nuttari (JR East) 1.9 km: 4 tracks/paired by direction
- Between Imamiya and Tennoji (JR West) 2.2 km: 4 tracks/paired by direction
- Between Inazawa and Nagoya (JR Central) 11.1 km/paired by use: 4 tracks
- Between Hiroshima and Kaitaichi (JR West) 6.4 km: 4 tracks/paired by direction
- Between Orio and Moji (JR Kyushu) 24.6 km
  - Orio – Kokura: 4 tracks/paired by use
  - Kokura – Higashi-Kokura 1.6 km/paired by direction: 6 tracks
  - Higashi-Kokura – Moji is paired by direction: 4 tracks
- Besides JR companies, the following private railway companies in Japan run their own quadruple (or more) tracked sections:
  - Tobu Railway, Keikyu, Seibu Railway, Keisei Railway, Tokyu, Odakyu, Keio and Tokyo Metro in Greater Tokyo.
  - Meitetsu and Kintetsu in Greater Nagoya
  - Keihan Railway, Kintetsu, Hankyu Railway, Hanshin Railway and Nankai Railway in Keihanshin.

=== Philippines ===
The country never implemented a quadruple-track line throughout its history, but there are plans for sections of the North–South Commuter Railway (NSCR) to be quadruplicated.

- The NSCR will run alongside the Metro Manila Subway between FTI and Bicutan stations from ARCA Road to Mañalac Avenue. Length is 2,628 m (8,622 ft).
- A branch line to Clark International Airport will have a flyover interchange with the mainline, creating a 1,520 m (4,990 ft) quadruplicated section.
  - A spur to the Mabalacat depot will diverge from the main branch, the latter heading underground. Length is 1,000 m (3,300 ft).

=== South Korea ===
- The Gyeongbu Line in South Korea is quadruplicated on 84.9 km from Cheonan station to Guro station, and sextuplicated on a further 11.7 km from Guro station to Seoul Station.
- The Gyeongin Line is quadruplicated for the entire length, except for a 1.9 km stretch of double track line between Dongincheon Station and Incheon Station.
- The Gyeongui Line is quadruplicated for 8.9 km from Digital Media City station to Neunggok station.

=== Thailand ===
- The SRT Northern Line from Bang Sue Central Station to Rangsit Station is quadruplicated on 26 km., 2 tracks for local commuter SRT Red Lines trains and 2 tracks for Intercity trains.
- The SRT Airport Rail Link runs beside the older SRT Eastern Line between Phaya Thai and Lat Krabang. Making quintuple tracks (5 tracks).

=== Turkey ===
- The Istanbul-Ankara railway has a 37 km (23 mi) long quadruple-track section between Sincan and Kayaş in Ankara, Turkey.

=== Australia ===
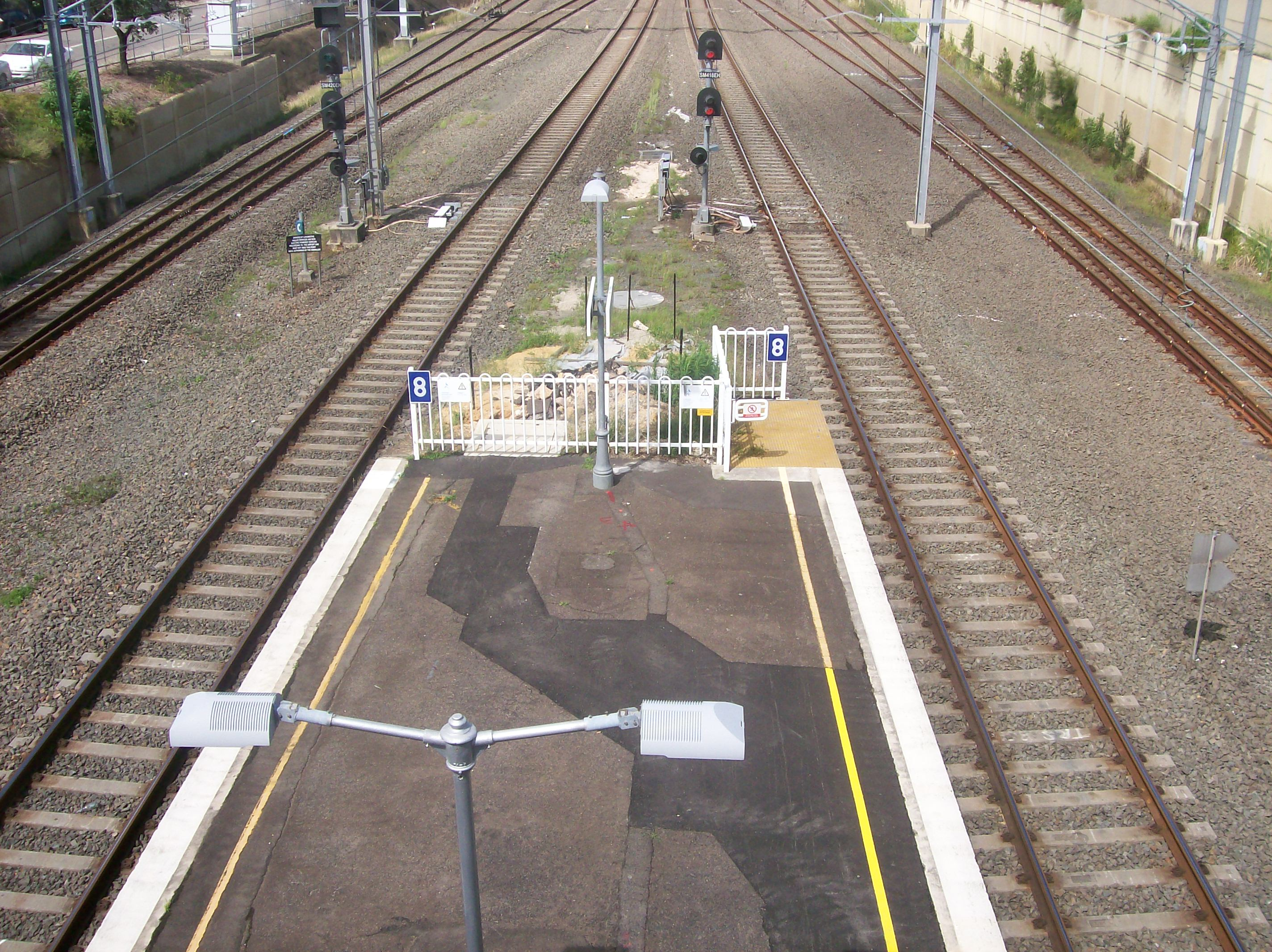
Turrella station on the East Hills line

- Adelaide-Wolseley line from Adelaide to Goodwood
- Bankstown line from Marrickville to Campsie
- East Hills line from Wolli Creek to Revesby
- Illawarra line from Illawarra Junction to Hurstville
- Main line, Queensland from Roma Street to Darra
- Main Northern line from North Strathfield to Rhodes, West Ryde to Epping & Islington Junction to Maitland
- Main Suburban line from Redfern to Strathfield (6 tracks)
- Main Western line from Strathfield to St Marys
- The Eastern Railway (used by the Airport and Midland lines) and South Western Railway (used by the Armadale, Thornlie–Cockburn and the Australind) run parallel in a quadruple track section from Perth to Claisebrook.
- North Coast line from Roma Street to Northgate & Lawnton to Petrie
- Serviceton line from Southern Cross to Sunshine (6 as far as Footscray)
- Burnley Group from Flinders Street to Burnley Station (10 as far as Richmond with the Caulfield Group.)
- Caulfield Group from Flinders Street to Caulfield (10 as far as Richmond with the Burnley Group, 6 as far as South Yarra.)

== See also ==
- Dual gauge
- Cross-platform interchange
- Spanish solution
