= Colwich railway station =

Former railway station in Staffordshire, England

Colwich
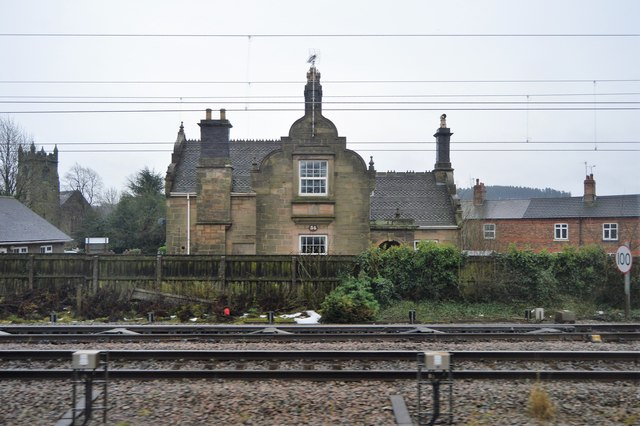
- Former station house

General information
- Location: Colwich, Staffordshire, England
- Coordinates: 52.7886°N 1.9868°W
- Grid reference: SK009212

Other information
- Status: Disused

History
- Original company: Trent Valley Railway
- Pre-grouping: London & North Western Railway; North Staffordshire Railway

Key dates
- 15 September 1847: Opened
- 3 February 1958: Closed
Location

Colwich railway station served the village of Colwich, in Staffordshire, England. The former station is adjacent to Colwich Junction, where the Trent Valley Line to Stafford and the cut-off line to Stoke-on-Trent diverge.

== History ==
Authorisation for a railway line between Rugby and Stafford was obtained in 1845 by the Trent Valley Railway. By 1847, the Trent Valley Railway Company had been incorporated in the London and North Western Railway (LNWR) and the line was opened. A station opened at Colwich in September of that year and, like most of the stations on the Trent Valley Railway, it was designed by the architect John William Livock.

In 1849, the railway line between Stone and Colwich was opened by the North Staffordshire Railway (NSR). At Colwich, the LNWR and NSR agreed to own and operate the station jointly; a situation that remained until both railways became part of the London, Midland and Scottish Railway in 1923.

Local passenger services over the former NSR route were withdrawn in 1947 and all other services were withdrawn from Colwich in 1958, when the station was closed.

Preceding station	Historical railways	Following station
Milford and Brocton; Line open, station closed	London & North Western Railway; Trent Valley Line	Rugeley Trent Valley; Line and station open
Great Haywood; Line open, station closed	North Staffordshire Railway; Stone to Colwich Line	Terminus

== The site today ==
The former station house remains alongside the tracks, which are still operational, and is now a Grade II listed building.

== See also ==
- Colwich rail crash, which occurred at the site of the station on 19 September 1986.
