= Bulkington railway station =

Railway station in Warwickshire, England

Coordinates: 52.477939°N 1.440869°W

Bulkington
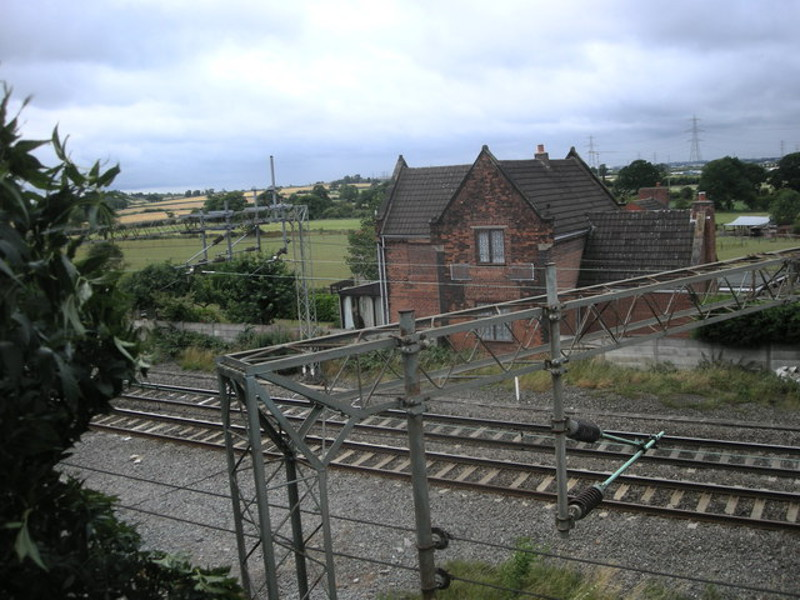
- The site of the station in 2010, with the former station building, now a private house.

General information
- Location: Bulkington; England
- Platforms: 3

Other information
- Status: Disused

History
- Original company: Trent Valley Line
- Pre-grouping: London and North Western Railway
- Post-grouping: London, Midland and Scottish Railway

Key dates
- 15 September 1847: Opened
- 18 May 1931: Closed
Location

Bulkington was a railway station on the Trent Valley Line serving the village of Bulkington, Warwickshire, England. The station was opened along with the line in 1847, and was closed in 1931.

The station had three platforms; one side platform, and an island platform.

The platforms are long gone, the only surviving remnant of the station today is the former station building alongside the tracks, which is now a private house.

The station building was designed by John William Livock, who designed most of the stations on the Trent Valley Railway. It is one of the few remaining examples of original Livock designed station buildings on the Trent Valley Line. Two others still exist at Atherstone and Colwich.

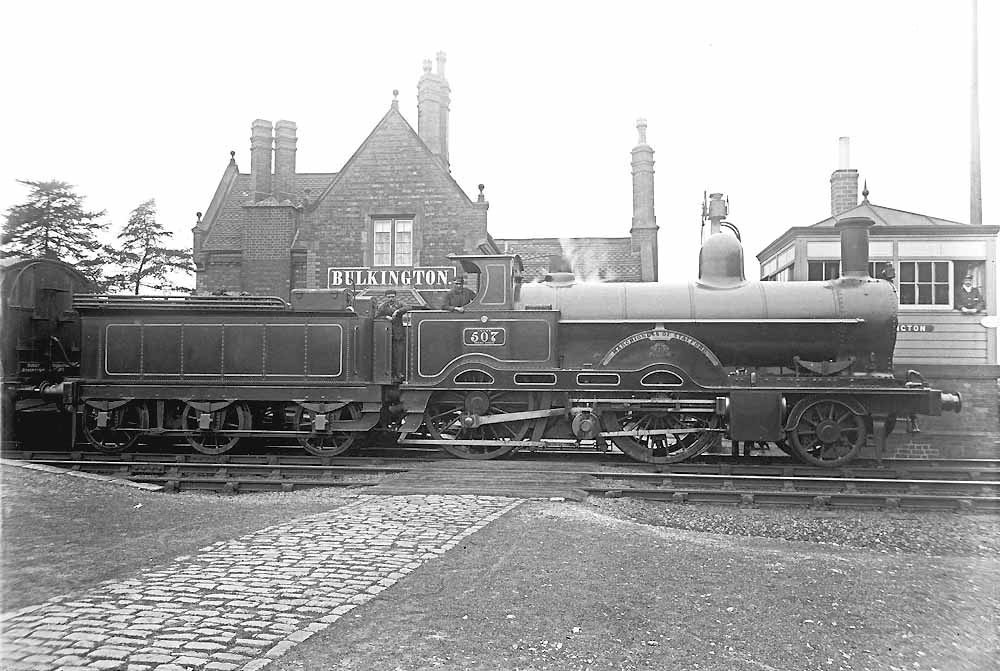
Bulkington station circa 1900, with a LNWR Dreadnought Class locomotive.

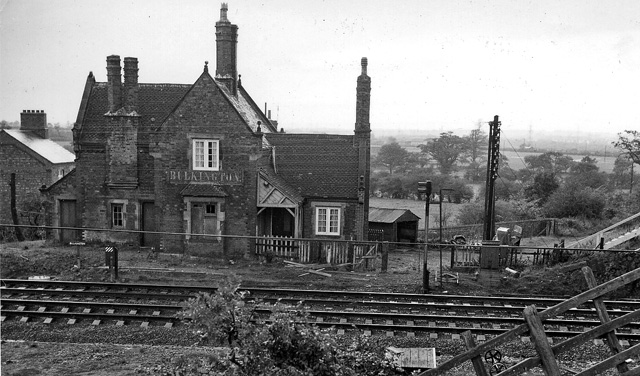
The remains of the station in 1961, 30 years after closure.

| Preceding station | Historical railways | Following station |
|---|---|---|
| Nuneaton; Line and station open | London and North Western Railway; Trent Valley Line | Shilton; Line open, station closed |
