= Shilton railway station =

Disused railway station in England

Coordinates: 52.4550°N 1.4075°W

Shilton

General information
- Location: England
- Platforms: 3

Other information
- Status: Disused

History
- Original company: LNWR
- Post-grouping: London, Midland and Scottish Railway

Key dates
- 15 September 1847: Opened
- 16 September 1957: Closed
Location

Shilton railway station was a railway station serving Shilton in the English county of Warwickshire, on the Trent Valley Line of the LNWR.

It was situated where Church Road crosses the line. The booking office was built on the bridge, with steps down to the two island platforms. Initially there were two running lines when the station opened in 1847. A third up line was added between Bulkington and Rugby in 1871, for which an extra arch was built for the bridge. This became a passenger line in 1876 utilising the opposite side of the up platform, and a further line provided sidings for 22 wagons. On the down side was a refuge siding from under the bridge, which later became the down goods and also became a loop from the main line. However although it ran next to the platform, it was fenced off.

The station buildings were constructed to designs by the architect John William Livock with a booking office built with brick for the front and side walls. The rest of it was timber which, over the years, became more and more dilapidated. The covered steps to the platforms were of corrugated iron. So it was not a pretty station and platform facilities were minimal, little more than a small waiting shelter on the down platform.

At grouping in 1923 it became part of the London Midland and Scottish Railway. It closed in 1957

Preceding station	Historical railways	Following station
Bulkington; Line open, station closed	London and North Western Railway; Trent Valley Line	Brinklow; Line open, station closed
