= Hixon railway station =

Former railway station in Staffordshire, England

Hixon
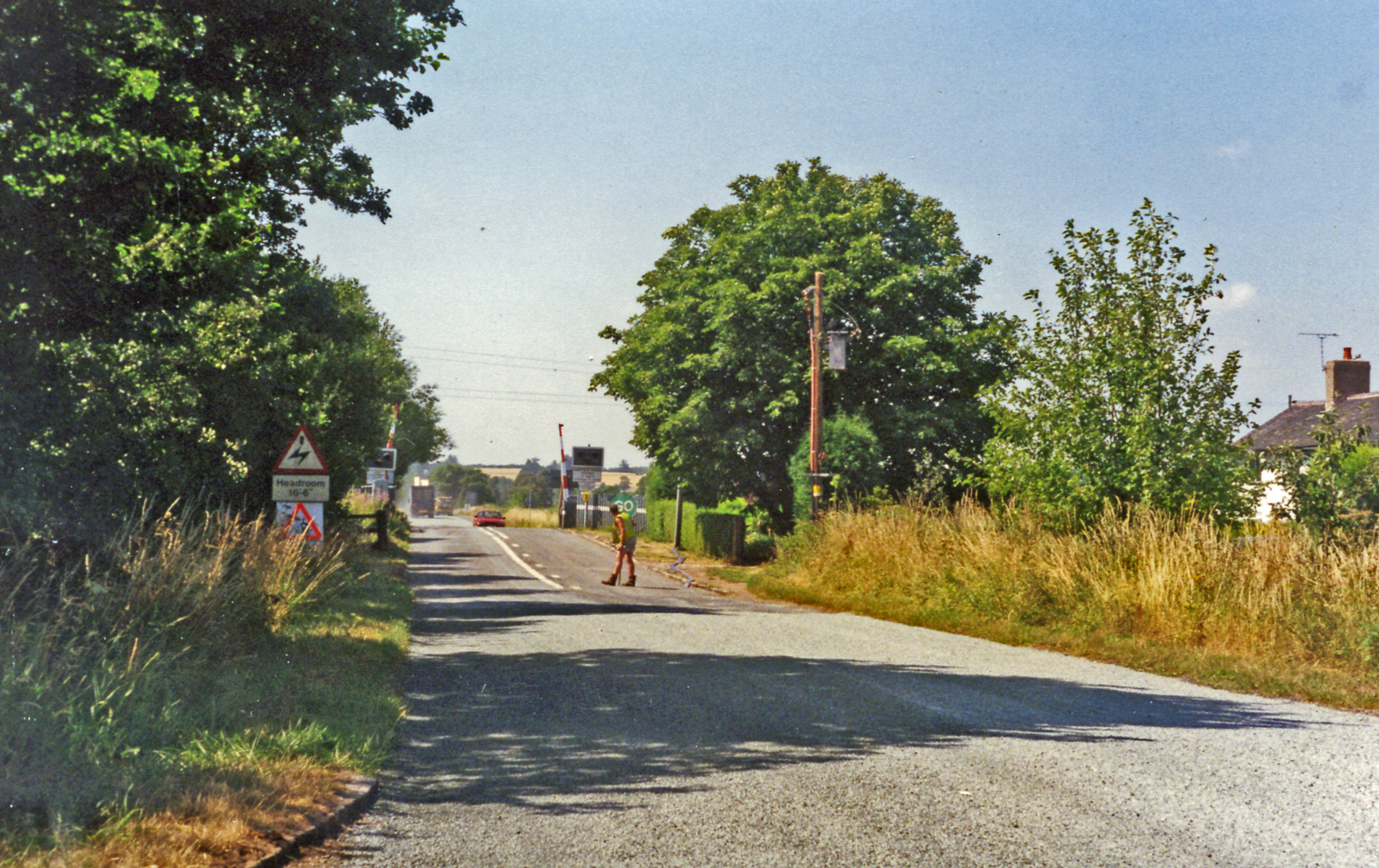
- The site of the station in 1995

General information
- Location: Hixon, Staffordshire; England
- Coordinates: 52.829872°N 2.012769°W
- Grid reference: SJ992258
- Platforms: 2

Other information
- Status: Disused

History
- Original company: North Staffordshire Railway
- Post-grouping: London, Midland & Scottish Railway

Key dates
- December 1864: Opened
- 6 January 1947: Closed
Location

Hixon railway station is a disused railway station in Staffordshire, England.

The railway line between Stone and Colwich was opened by the North Staffordshire Railway (NSR) in 1849 A station was opened to serve the village of Hixon, the exact opening date of the station is not recorded but it first appeared in Bradshaw's Railway Guide in December 1864. Although the line was a busy route for the NSR for traffic to and from Birmingham and the south; the amount of local traffic carried was low and passenger services were never intensive.

The station was renamed as Hixon Halt by the London, Midland and Scottish Railway.

Passenger services on the line were, as a wartime measure, reduced in 1941 to a single train per day from Stoke which had no corresponding return journey. In 1947 all stopping passenger services between Stone and Colwich were withdrawn and Hixon along with the neighbouring station, Great Haywood, closed.

At the north end of the station was a level crossing and it was this crossing that was the scene of the Hixon rail crash in January 1968.

Preceding station	Historical railways	Following station
Weston and Ingestre; Line open, station closed	North Staffordshire Railway; Stone to Colwich Line	Great Haywood; Line open, station closed
