= Milford and Brocton railway station =

Disused railway station in Milford, Staffordshire

Milford and Brocton
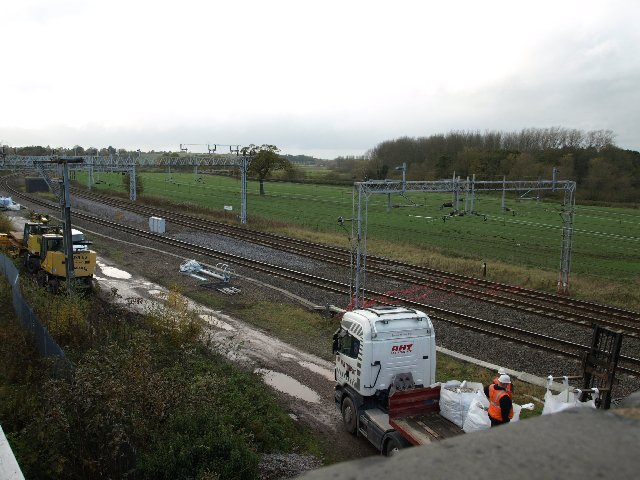
- The site of the station in 2008

General information
- Location: Milford, Staffordshire; England
- Coordinates: 52.7893°N 2.04°W
- Grid reference: SJ974213
- Platforms: 2

Other information
- Status: Disused

History
- Original company: London and North Western Railway
- Post-grouping: London, Midland and Scottish Railway

Key dates
- 18 May 1877: Opened
- 6 March 1950: Closed
Location

Milford and Brocton railway station served the villages of Milford and Brocton in Staffordshire, England from 1877 to 1950 on the Trent Valley line.

== History ==
The station opened on 18 May 1877 by the London and North Western Railway. The station closed to both passengers and goods traffic on 6 March 1950.

Preceding station	Historical railways	Following station
Stafford; Line and station open	London and North Western Railway; Trent Valley line	Colwich; Line open, station closed
