= Great Haywood railway station =

Former railway station in Staffordshire, England

Great Haywood
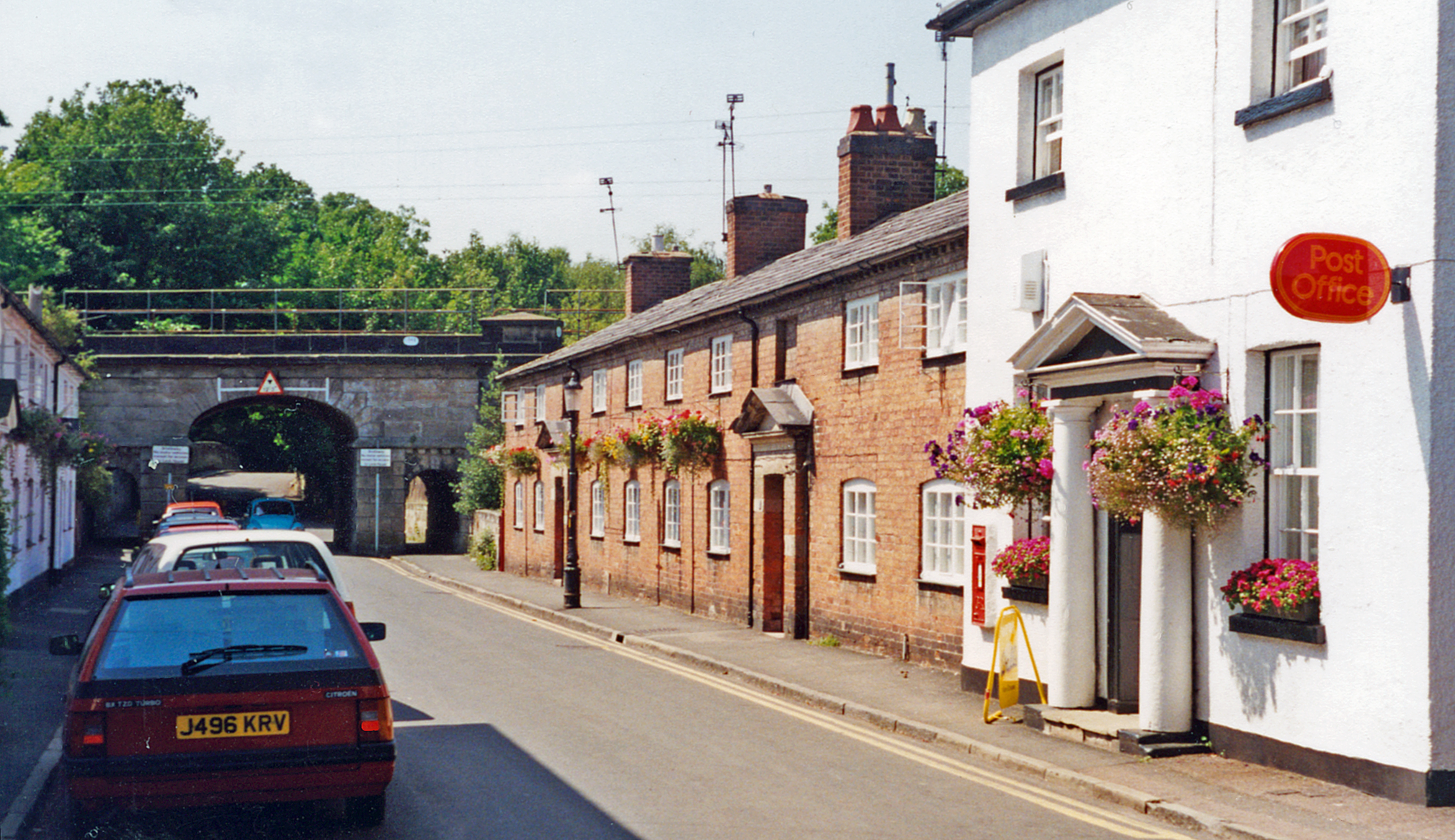
- The site of the station in 1995

General information
- Location: Great Haywood, Staffordshire; England
- Coordinates: 52.800694°N 2.006619°W
- Grid reference: SJ996225
- Platforms: 2

Other information
- Status: Disused

History
- Original company: North Staffordshire Railway
- Post-grouping: London, Midland & Scottish Railway

Key dates
- 6 June 1887: Opened
- 6 January 1947: Closed
Location

Great Haywood railway station is a disused railway station in Staffordshire, England.

The railway line between Stone and Colwich, England, was opened by the North Staffordshire Railway (NSR) in 1849 but a station to serve the village of Great Haywood was not opened until 1887. Although the line was a busy route for the NSR for traffic to and from Birmingham and the south; the amount of local traffic carried was low and passenger services were never intensive.

Passenger services on the line were, as a wartime measure, reduced in 1941 to a single train per day from Stoke which had no corresponding return journey. In 1947 all stopping passenger services between Stone and Colwich were withdrawn and Great Haywood along with the neighbouring station, Hixon, closed.

Preceding station	Historical railways	Following station
Hixon; Line open, station closed	North Staffordshire Railway; Stone to Colwich Line	Colwich; Line open, station closed
