= Wolseley Hall =

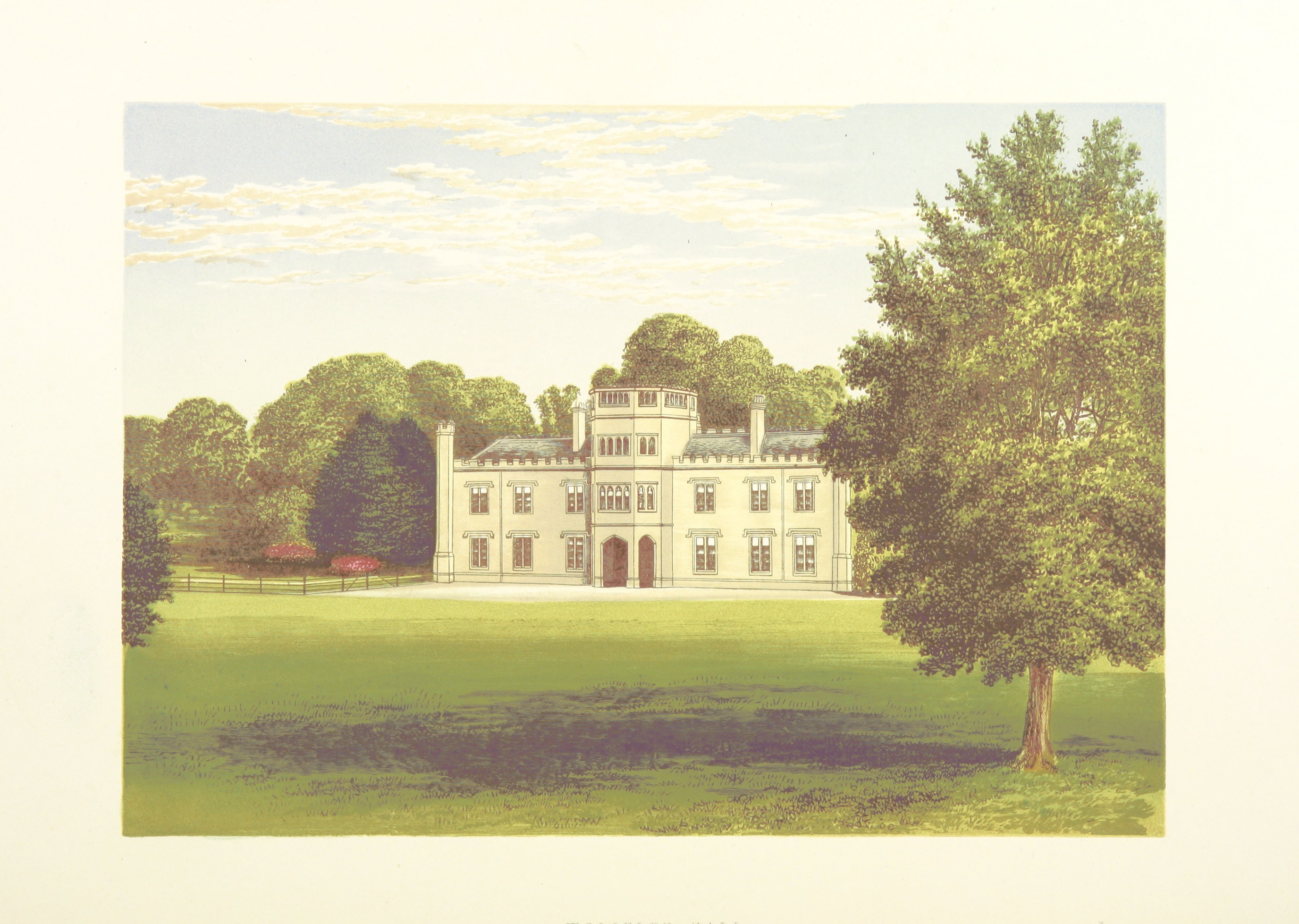
- Wolseley Hall, from The County Seats of the Noblemen and Gentlemen of Great Britain and Ireland by Francis Orpen Morris

- Location within Staffordshire

General information
- Location: Near Rugeley, Staffordshire
- Coordinates: 52°46′49″N 1°57′52″W
- Completed: Late 17th century
- Demolished: 1966

Wolseley Hall was a stately home near the village of Colwich, in Staffordshire, England. It was demolished in 1966; the former gardens are now a nature reserve of the Wolseley Centre.

== History ==
=== The manor house ===
The estate was held by the Wolseley family from the 11th century, when Edric de Wholesley lived here. It was granted to the family as a reward for killing the wolves which, by attacking the deer, were detrimental to the King's hunting in the county.

A moated manor house was built in the 11th century. During the reign of Edward IV, Ralph Wolseley, who was a Baron of the Exchequer, created a deer park, and was granted a licence to crenellate the house.

=== The hall ===
Sir Robert Wolseley, 1st Baronet (1587–1646), was a Royalist army officer during the Civil War. His estate was subsequently confiscated, and the manor house fell into ruin. On the restoration of the monarchy the family regained their lands, and a new house was built by Sir Charles Wolseley, 2nd Baronet, a short distance from the old manor house. There were alterations by James Trubshaw in the 1820s.

The hall was damaged by fire in the 1950s, and demolished in 1966. In the 1990s there was some restoration of the gardens, by Sir Charles Wolseley. It is now the Wolseley Centre: a nature reserve and the headquarters of the Staffordshire Wildlife Trust since 2003.

== See also ==
- Wolseley baronets
