= Brinklow railway station =

Disused railway station in Warwickshire, England

Coordinates: 52.42226°N 1.35253°W

Brinklow
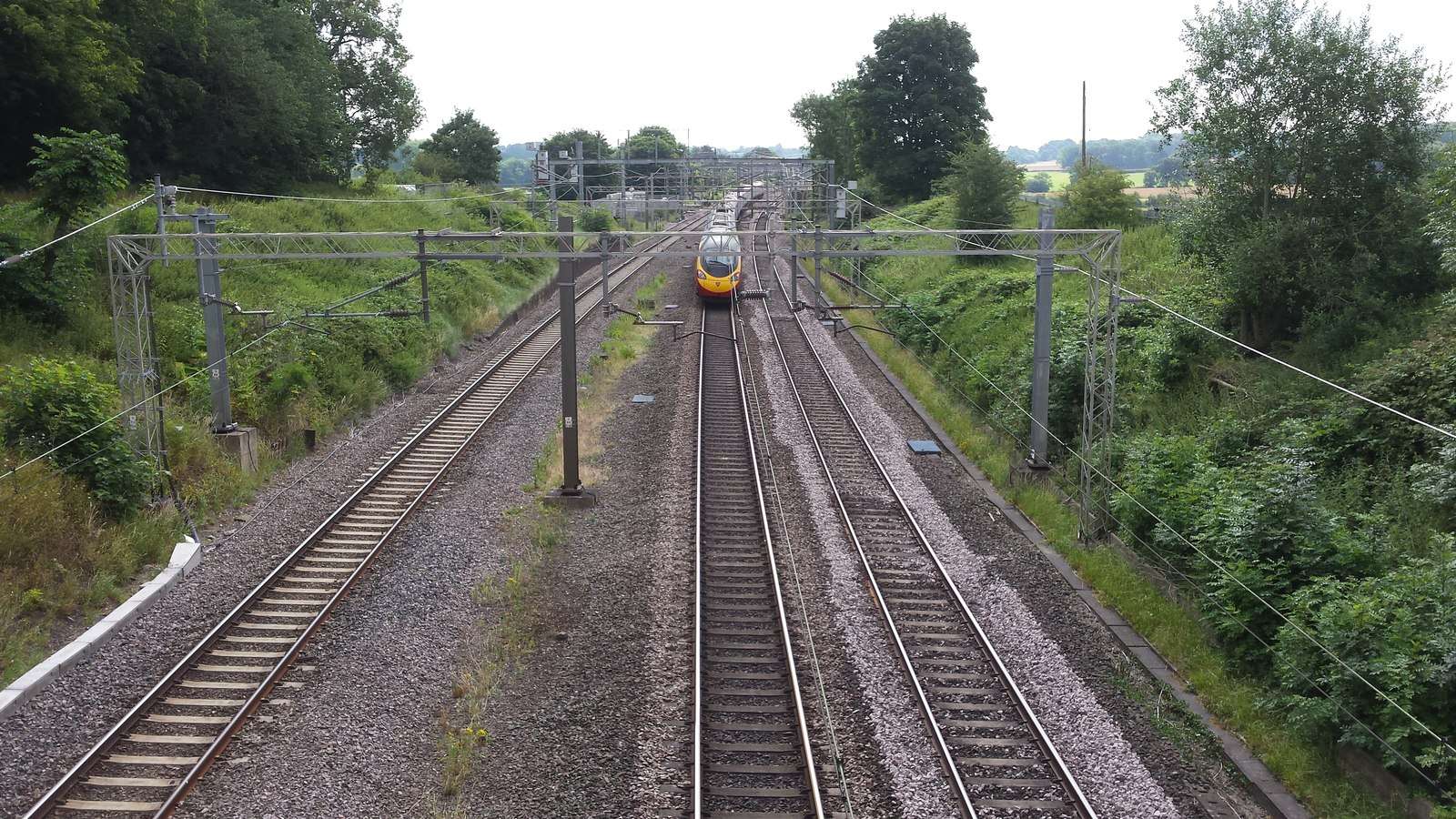
- View of the former station site in 2017, looking SE, towards Rugby and London

General information
- Location: Warwickshire; England
- Platforms: 3

Other information
- Status: Disused

History
- Original company: LNWR
- Post-grouping: London, Midland and Scottish Railway

Key dates
- 15 September 1847: Opened as Stretton (or Streeton)
- 1 February 1870: Renamed Brinklow
- 16 September 1957: Closed
Location

Brinklow railway station was a railway station almost midway between Brinklow and Stretton-under-Fosse in the English county of Warwickshire, opened in 1847 on the Trent Valley Line. Until 1870 it was known as Stretton or possibly Streeton It was also described as Brinklow for Stretton Under Fosse in some timetables.

Although line opened in September 1847, full services including those from Brinklow did not begin until 1 December of that year. Initially the station had two platforms, but the traffic along the line was such that an up third line was opened on 14 August 1871. Initially a goods line, it was upgraded in June 1876, when presumably the third platform was added. In 1899 permission was given to quadruple the track between Rugby and Nuneaton. However, with more powerful locomotives coming into use, the work was only partly carried out.

The station was next to the B4027 road, with the booking office on the overbridge and covered staircases down to each platform on which passenger facilities were limited to a shelter on the down platform. There were two long sidings, one with a loop which passed through a goods shed.

At grouping in 1923 it became part of the London Midland and Scottish Railway.

There were six down and five up trains each day in 1895, which had reduced to four down and three up in 1946. The station closed to passengers on 16 September 1957 and for goods on 20 February 1961. There was a signal box which was removed when Rugby Power Signal Box was opened in 1964.

The station buildings, platforms and sidings have disappeared, though the entrance road is still present with a barrow crossing which leads to nowhere.

Preceding station	Historical railways	Following station
Shilton; Line open, station closed	London and North Western Railway; Trent Valley Line	Rugby; Line and station open
