= Wolseley Centre =

Visitor centre in Staffordshire, England

- Location within Staffordshire
- Location: near Rugeley, Staffordshire
- OS grid: SK 025 203
- Coordinates: 52°46′49″N 1°57′52″W
- Area: 26 acres (11 ha)
- Operator: Staffordshire Wildlife Trust
- Website: https://www.staffs-wildlife.org.uk/explore/our-visitor-centres/wolseley-centre

The Wolseley Centre is a visitor centre and nature reserve of the Staffordshire Wildlife Trust, in Staffordshire, England, about 2 miles (3 km) north-west of Rugeley, and about 7 miles (11 km) south-east of the county town of Stafford.

== History ==
=== Wolseley Hall ===
The site was formerly the gardens of Wolseley Hall, which was built in the late 17th century. The hall was demolished in 1966; in the 1990s there was some restoration of the gardens, by Sir Charles Wolseley. The site was later converted into a nature reserve, and it has been the headquarters of the Staffordshire Wildlife Trust since 2003.

=== Redevelopment ===
From November 2018 the site was redeveloped, to have a new café with views across the adjacent lake, an improved car park and other features across the site. The redeveloped centre was officially opened on 12 June 2019 by the Lord Lieutenant of Staffordshire.

== Grounds ==
There are 26 acres (11 ha) of grounds, including woodlands, lakes, pools and marshland, in which there are wildlife habitats. A boardwalk enables views of pools and marshland. There are wildflower meadows and display gardens, and a sensory garden. The paths and boardwalk are suitable for wheelchair users.
