= Colwich Junction =

Railway junction in Staffordshire, England

Coordinates: 52°47′17″N 1°58′45″W

Colwich Junction is a rail junction near the village of Little Haywood, in the county of Staffordshire, England. It is the junction between two routes of the West Coast Main Line: the Trent Valley line and the Stone to Colwich cutoff line. The junction was the site of the 1986 Colwich rail crash.

== Routes ==
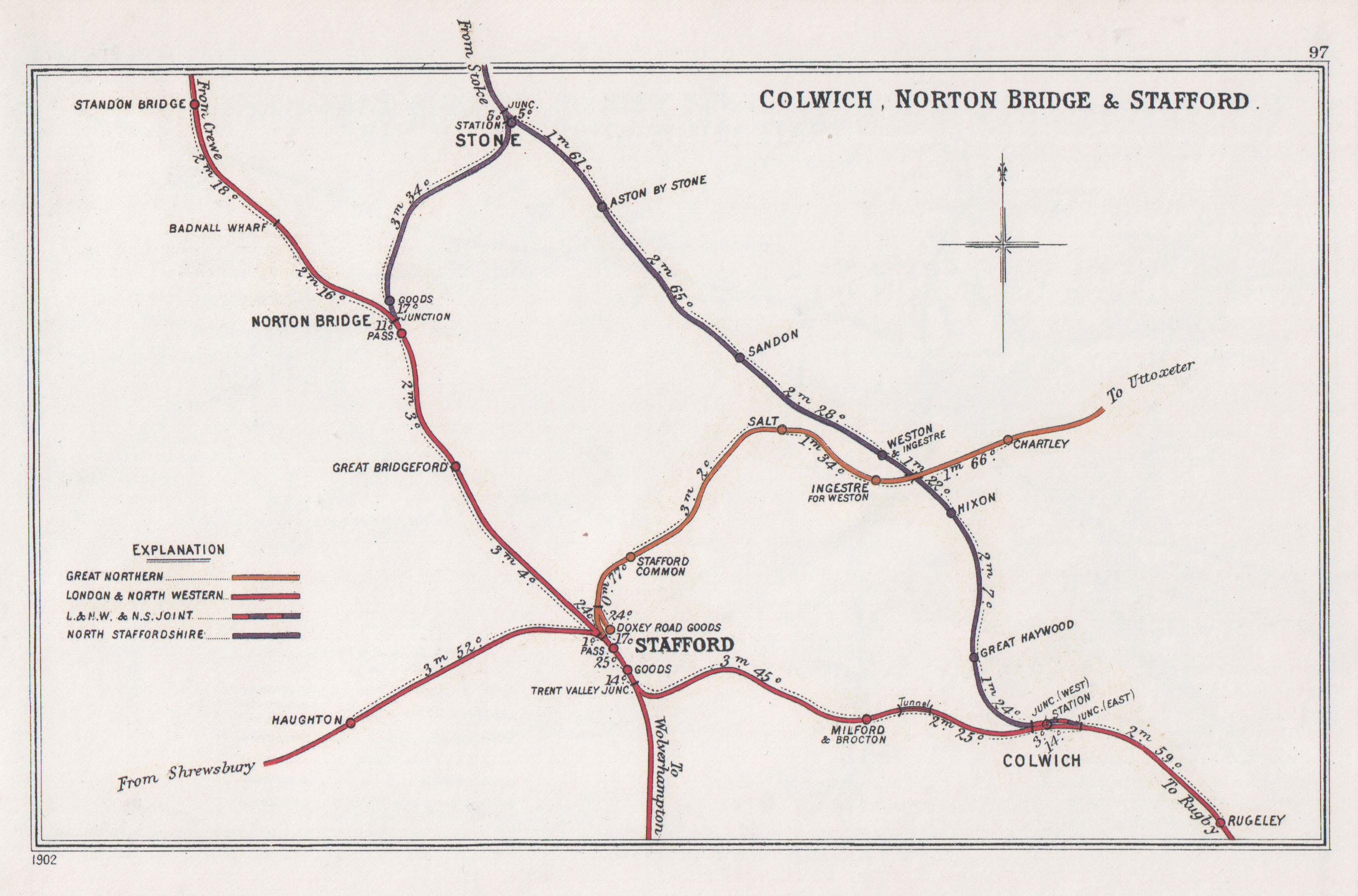
Colwich, Norton Bridge & Stafford RJD 97

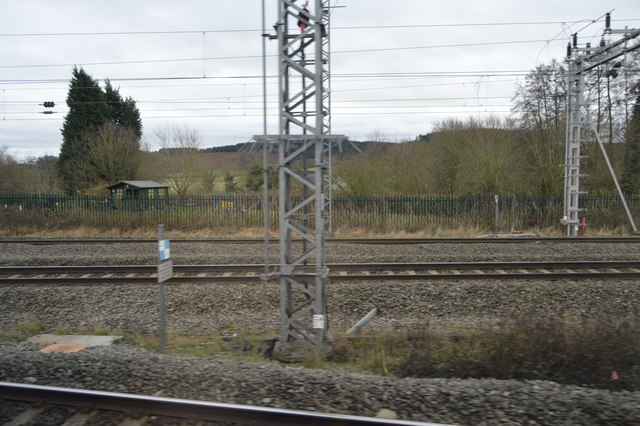
Colwich Junction - geograph.org.uk - 4751155

Situated on the Trent Valley Line section of the WCML between Rugeley Trent Valley and Stafford, it accesses a twin track, electrified (25 kV AC overhead line) cut off line through to Stone, where it joins the North Staffordshire Railways main line (Stafford to Cheadle Hulme Junction via Stoke-on-Trent). This provides a shorter route to Manchester Piccadilly than using lines via Stafford or Crewe, although the route via Crewe and Wilmslow is technically a faster route due to fewer speed restrictions on the route.

South of the junction, the line is quadruple tracked towards Nuneaton & Rugby but to the north both lines continue as double track only (though the WCML remains so only for two miles before quadrupling once more again on the approaches to Stafford). The main line dates from 1847 and was opened by the London and North Western Railway, whilst the branch towards Stone was opened by the NSR two years later.

Prior to June 2005, the junction was worked locally from a British Rail LMR Type 15 brick and timber electro-mechanical signal box, but this has since been closed and the lines in the area transferred to the control of the signalling centre at Stoke-on-Trent.

At the start of 2024, a further £85 million was spent by Network Rail modernising and improving the route from Rugeley to Colwich which included 39 new signals, 124 new axle counters and moving signalling control to Rugby Rail operating centre - Colwich Workstation.

== Stations ==
There are currently no stations on the Colwich Junction to Stone line, local stopping services having been withdrawn by the LMS in January 1947. Although there were platforms on this line at Stone, they have been demolished. There was a station at Colwich itself, but this closed in 1958.

== Progressive modernisation ==
The junction and associated lines have been progressively modernised and upgraded over the years. In the middle of the twentieth century substantial upgrades took place including electrification, with the 1955 Modernisation Plan. Continuing improvements occurred as part of the West Coast Main Line route modernisation project. Virgin Trains took on the franchise to run train services on the routes through the junction in 1997 and asked for lines to be upgraded to allow for business growth. The upgrade started in 1998 and was completed in 2009 but with major cost overruns and parliamentary scrutiny.

Since 2009 other major work has taken place such as a blockade over Christmas 2017. This has included closure of footpath level crossings. In July 2023 progressive modernisation of the signal system took place in the Trent Valley area including Colwich Junction.

== Accident history ==
There was a rail accident here on Friday 19 September 1986, when two express passenger trains collided - see Colwich rail crash. In addition, the lines at the junction also had to be shut in 2009 after a light aircraft crashed at the site resulting in the death of two people.
