= Colwich–Stone line =

Railway line in Staffordshire, England

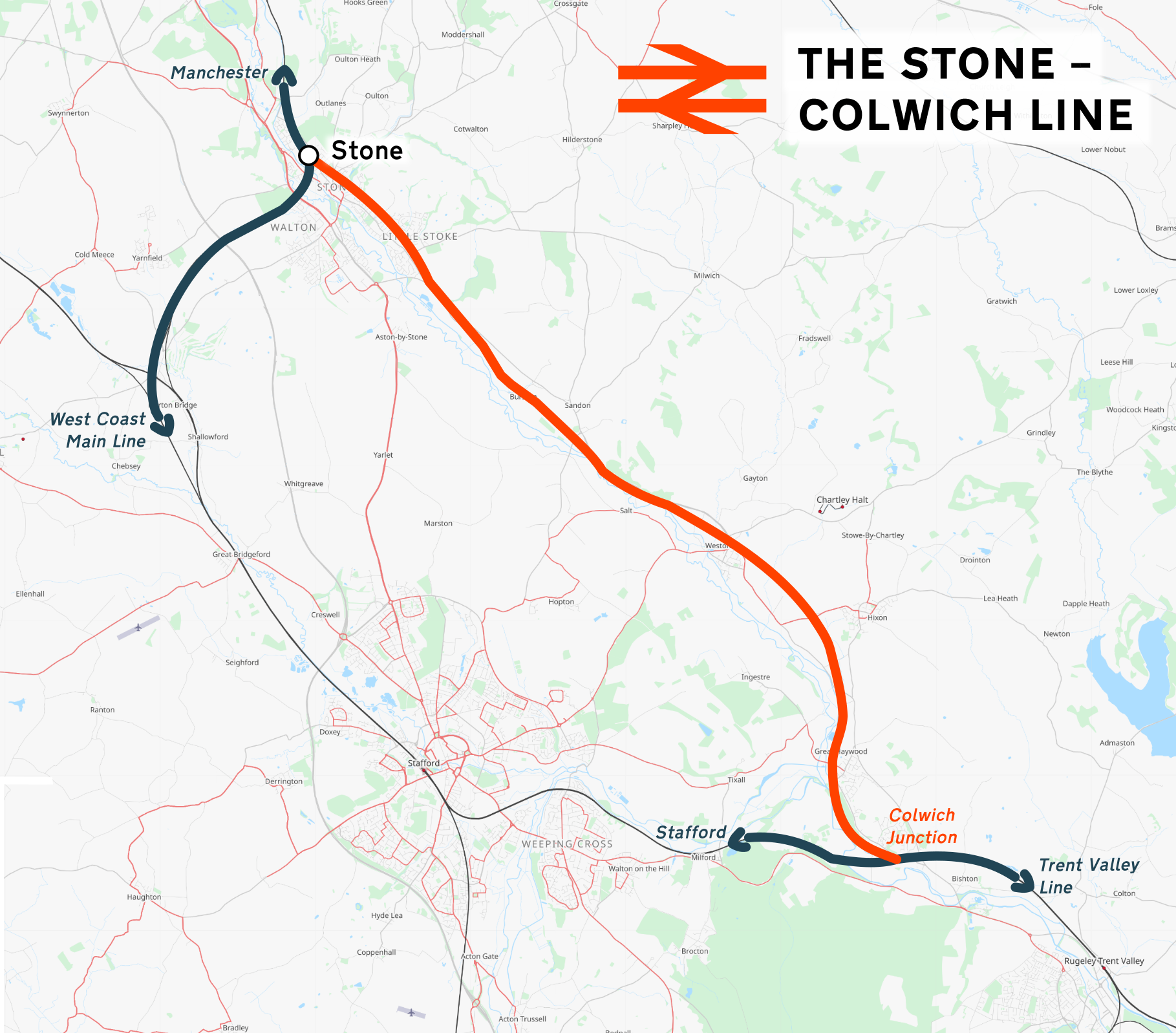
Route map (Click to expand)

The Stone to Colwich Line is a 11.7 miles (18.8 km) long railway line in Staffordshire which serves as a cut-off for West Coast Main Line services to Manchester Piccadilly. This route goes direct from Rugeley Trent Valley to Stoke-on-Trent, not going via Stafford.

== History ==
The line was built by the North Staffordshire Railway (NSR) and opened to traffic on 1 May 1849.

The NSR opened several intermediate stations along the route but these were all closed by the London, Midland and Scottish Railway in 1947 (shortly before nationalisation of the UK railway network).

During the Second World War due to the proximity of RAF Hixon, the line was blocked on several occasions resulting from aircraft crashes on or close to the line.

The line was the location of the Hixon rail crash in January 1968, which killed 11 people.

== Route ==
The line diverges from the Trent Valley Line at Colwich Junction and runs through to join the Stafford to Manchester Line at Stone.

The route was electrified with 25 kV overhead as part of the electrification of the West Coast Main Line by British Rail in the 1960s. It is double track throughout its length. Nearly all of the traffic it carries is now passenger trains, although there used to be a regular flow of Class 47 powered Merry Go Round coal services from the coal mines of the Stoke-on-Trent area to the Rugeley power stations.

== Services ==
The majority of trains on the route are operated by Avanti West Coast which is used for their London Euston to Manchester Piccadilly via Stoke-on-Trent services in which 2 trains per hour in each direction run. Some morning and evening peak West Midlands Trains trains between London Euston and Crewe also operate via this route.
