= Colwich railway accident =

Railway collision in Staffordshire, England, in 1986

Coordinates: 52°47′18″N 1°59′16″W

Colwich rail crash

Details
- Date: 19 September 1986; 18:28
- Location: Colwich Junction, Staffordshire,
- Country: England
- Line: West Coast Main Line
- Incident type: Collision
- Cause: Driver's error

Statistics
- Trains: 2
- Passengers: ~873
- Deaths: 1
- Injured: 75

The Colwich rail crash occurred on the evening of Friday 19 September 1986 at Colwich Junction, in Staffordshire, England. It was significant in that it was a high-speed collision between two packed express trains. One driver was killed, but no passengers died because of the crashworthiness of the rolling stock involved, which included Mk1, Mk2 and Mk3 coaches.

== Background ==
Colwich Junction lies between Rugeley Trent Valley and Stafford; it is where the four-tracked West Coast Main Line from London splits into two routes. Approaching from the south, two tracks go to Manchester Piccadilly, via Stoke-on-Trent, and two tracks go to Stafford and Crewe. In the middle of the layout, two of the lines cross each other at a diamond crossing.

In August 1986, the signalling was altered so that drivers of northbound trains taking the Stoke line would see flashing yellow signals on approach. The rulebook meaning of this was:

"A flashing yellow aspect means facing points at a junction ahead are set for a diverging route and the speed of the train must be reduced."

This sequence of signalling had been designed for use at higher-speed turnouts as a replacement for approach release, where the junction signal is held at red until the train is near to it.

However, flashing yellows were also installed at locations where trains cross over between different tracks travelling in the same direction, e.g. from a fast to a slow line. While not junctions in the traditional sense, the signalling sequence was identical to that given at a diverging route.

== The accident ==
Diverging route signalling – the driver must slow down and be prepared to stop at the red signal

On 19 September 1986, the signalman at Colwich saw that the 17:00 express train from London Euston to Manchester Piccadilly was approaching the junction at roughly the same time as the 17:20 express from Liverpool Lime Street to Euston. He decided to give precedence to the latter and so the Manchester train might need to wait its turn over the junction.

The Manchester train needed to cross from the down fast line to the down slow line, before turning off towards Stoke. The signals presented to its driver were as follows:

Signal no.	Aspect	Meaning
CH105	Flashing double yellow	Advance indication of diverging route ahead
CH103	Flashing single yellow	Indication of diverging route ahead
CH18	Single yellow with junction indicator	Next signal at danger. Next set of points have been set for a diverging route.
CH23	Red	Danger – stop

After passing over the crossover, he saw that CH23 was still red. Having interpreted the flashing yellows to mean that the route was set all the way over the junction to Stoke, he was expecting this signal to clear as he approached it (as under the approach release system) but, as he got nearer, he realised it had not.

The driver made an emergency brake application, but the train did not stop before reaching the diamond crossing. At that moment, he saw the Liverpool train approaching at high speed and shouted a warning to a trainee driver who was also in the cab. They both jumped from the locomotive almost immediately before the Liverpool train collided with it.

The locomotive of the Liverpool train was 86211 City of Milton Keynes. It hit the other locomotive 86429 The Times side-on, which finished up in the wreckage with its body twisted and split open. The passenger coaches were scattered in all directions and some had their ends badly damaged. Eric Goode, the driver of no. 86211, was killed. It was also reported that Nicaragua's ambassador to Britain, Francisco d'Escoto, was one of the injured passengers.

== Investigation ==
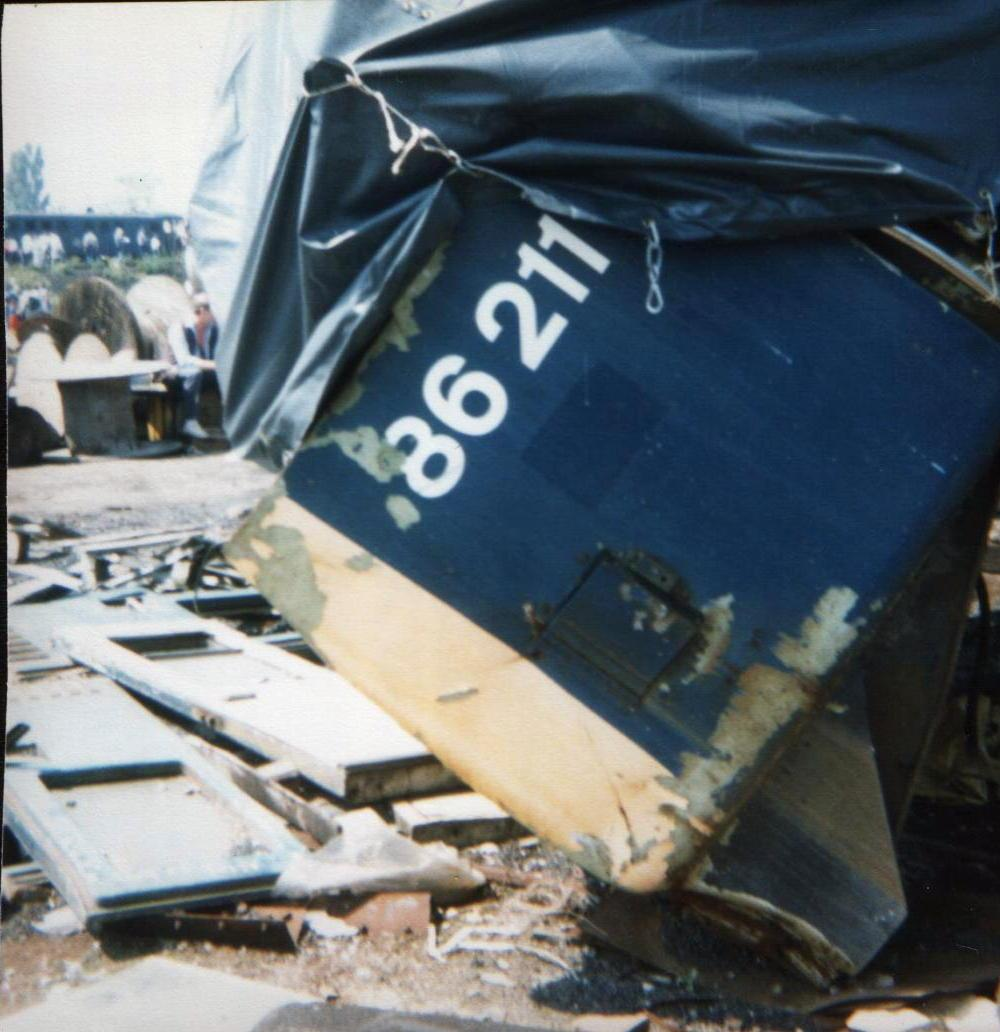
The destroyed cab of 86211 at Crewe Works in 1987; the driver of the locomotive was killed in the accident

After the accident, the driver went to the signal box and told the signalman "You had double flashing yellows and the route was set for Stoke." With traditional junction layouts in mind, flashing yellows would have meant that the route was set for him right through the junction, with at worst, the red signal on the far side. It was not; at Colwich, the signalling system was designed for the diverging route to be only the crossover from the down fast to the down slow, and the driver was not expecting to see a red signal before taking the Stoke line. In this respect, railway nomenclature had unwittingly set a trap; he had after all seen a 'Junction Indicator' illuminated and thus assumed that his train had been routed across the junction.

The public inquiry centred on whether the driver had had adequate training on the recently introduced flashing yellow signals and the implications at multiple junctions. The driver admitting to signing for, but not actually reading, the notice that referred to the installation of flashing yellows at Colwich the previous month.

A contributory factor was the lack of flank protection given the layout at Colwich Junction. The accident would not have happened if the points had been set to route the train away from the diamond crossing, rather than head-on into the Liverpool train's path, as would have been normal practice in an older manual installation. This feature was not included in the junction design because it would have prevented a parallel movement from being signalled on the down fast line, even though, in this particular case, the train had approached on the down fast line anyway.

This lesson was not learned; lack of flank protection would again prove a significant factor in a head-on collision, at the Ladbroke Grove rail crash in 1999, with a similar track layout.

== Recommendations ==
The Inspector's report recommended changing the signalling system so that a flashing yellow sequence could only occur when the route was set across the whole junction, as the driver was expecting. A second recommendation was to inhibit wheel slide protection (WSP) during an emergency brake application; practical tests suggested the train could then have stopped before fouling the junction. The latter recommendation was not implemented.

== Memorial ==
Local resident Alf Taylor created a memorial to Eric Goode at the site of the accident, which he looked after until his death in 1997. On 17 September 2006, the Sunday before the 20th anniversary of the accident, the garden was rededicated.

In 2010, a new road in Crewe, where Eric Goode was based, was named after him. The road is on the site of the railway bingo club he frequented.

== See also ==
- List of rail accidents in the United Kingdom
- Lists of rail accidents.
