= Trent Valley line =

Part of the West Coast Main Line railway in England

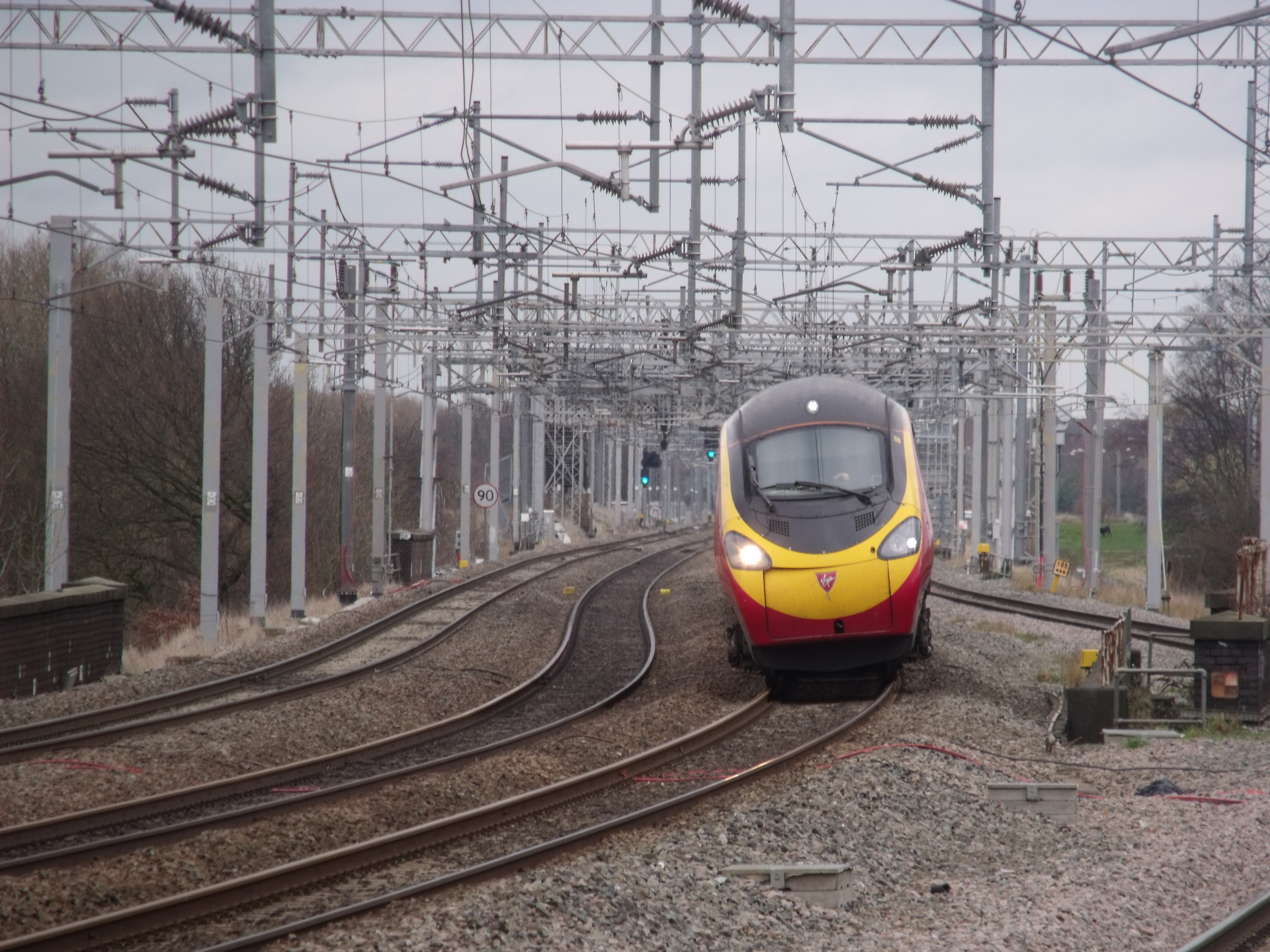
- A Virgin Trains Class 390 at Tamworth in 2012

Overview
- Owner: Network Rail
- Locale: West Midlands (region)
- Termini: Rugby; Stafford
- Stations: 8

Service
- Type: Heavy rail
- System: National Rail; (West Coast Main Line)
- Operator(s): Avanti West Coast; London Northwestern Railway; Lumo
- Rolling stock: Class 221 Super Voyager; Class 350 Desiro; Class 390 Pendolino; Class 730 Aventra

History
- Work began: 1845
- Opened: 15 September 1847
- Electrified: 1962–1965
- Upgraded: 2004–2008

Technical
- Number of tracks: 2–4
- Track gauge: 1,435 mm (4 ft 8 1/2 in) standard gauge
- Electrification: 25 kV AC overhead catenary
- Operating speed: 110 or 125 mph (180 or 200 km/h)
Route map
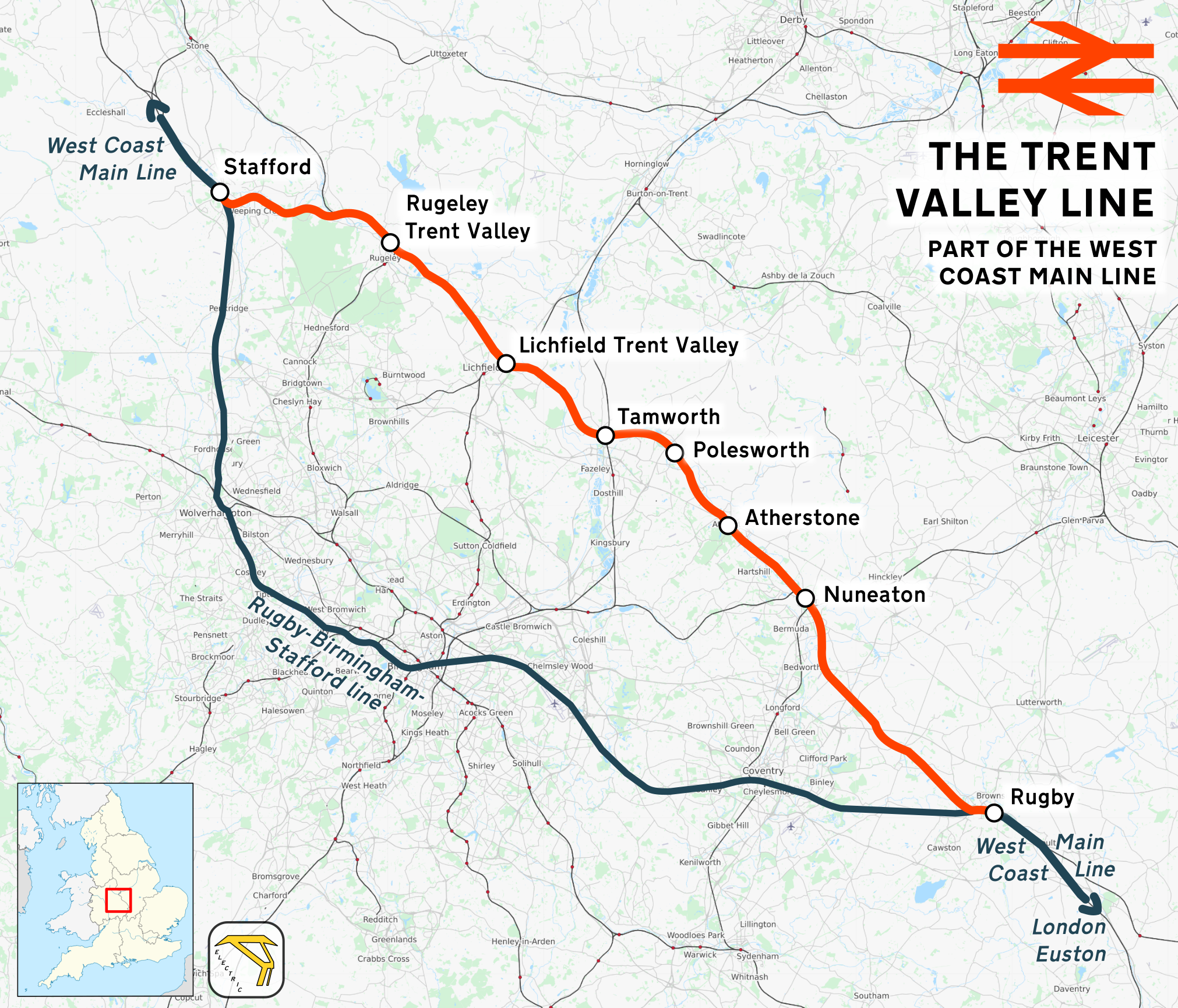
(Click to expand)

The Trent Valley line is a railway line between Rugby and Stafford in England, forming part of the West Coast Main Line. The line is 51 miles (82 km) long and is named after the River Trent which it follows. It was built to provide a direct route from London to North West England and Scotland, avoiding the slower route via Birmingham, which is congested and 7.75 miles (12.47 km) longer.

== Places served ==
The cities, towns and villages served by the line are listed below.

- Stafford
- Rugeley
- Lichfield
- Tamworth
- Polesworth
- Atherstone
- Nuneaton
- Rugby

== Services ==
A range of long-distance services use the route, which are run by two train operating companies:

- West Midlands Trains, under the London Northwestern Railway brand, uses the route as part of its hourly long-distance semi-fast service between London Euston and Crewe. These call at all stations on the route, except Polesworth which is served only by one daily northbound service.
- Avanti West Coast uses the route for its inter-city services from London Euston to Manchester Piccadilly, Liverpool Lime Street, Chester, Holyhead and Glasgow Central. With the exception of Nuneaton on London-Manchester services, these services rarely stop at intermediate stations on the Trent Valley route.
- Lumo uses the route to operate a daily service between London Euston and Stirling. Nuneaton is the only station on the Trent Valley line to be called at on this service.

== History ==
The Trent Valley line was opened in 1847 to give a more direct route from London to the North West of England, bypassing the existing route via Birmingham built by the Grand Junction Railway and the London and Birmingham Railway a decade earlier. The contractor for the 50 miles (80 km) of double-track line was the London Railway Contractors Partnership of Thomas Brassey, John Stephenson and William MacKenzie. The engineers were Robert Stephenson (no relation to John), George Parker Bidder and Thomas Longridge Gooch and the architect was John William Livock.

Construction was initially started by an independent company, the Trent Valley Railway (TVR), which was established in Manchester in April 1844. Its act of incorporation, the Trent Valley Railway Act 1845 (8 & 9 Vict. c. cxii), received royal assent on 21 July 1845. Construction of the line commenced in November 1845, the first sod being cut ceremonially at Tamworth by Sir Robert Peel on 13 November. In September 1845 Salford-born 26-year-old Edward Watkin was appointed secretary, and having entered the railway world via the TVR he later went on to become one of Britain's most prominent railway barons.

Whilst under construction, the TVR was bought by the London and Birmingham Railway (L&BR) on 15 April 1846, the L&BR itself amalgamating with other railways to form the London and North Western Railway (LNWR) on 16 July 1846. The largest single engineering feature of the line was the 774 yd (708 m) Shugborough Tunnel near Stafford. The Trent Valley line was opened to a limited service of local passenger trains and through goods trains on 15 September 1847, to local goods trains on 20 October 1847 (the delay due to the goods-handling facilities at the stations not being completed) and finally to all through traffic on 1 December 1847. It is now part of what is called the West Coast Main Line.

The line was originally built with two tracks, but growing traffic meant that several stretches were widened to four tracks between 1871 and 1909.

=== Electrification ===
The line was electrified on the 25 kV AC system during the 1960s, in the wake of the 1955 British Rail modernisation plan.

=== 2004 to 2008 works ===
Prior to this work being carried out, the West Coast Main Line had four tracks between London and Rugby, comprising a "fast line" and a "slow line" in each direction (the slow lines diverting via the Northampton Loop Line). Similarly, there were four tracks north of Stafford. Although parts of the Trent Valley line previously had four tracks, there was an 11-mile (18 km) long section of track between Tamworth and Armitage that had only ever been double track. When plans for the modernisation of the WCML were being developed in the 1990s, it was realised that these arrangements could not accommodate the faster Pendolino trains as well as slower local services. It was therefore decided to increase the number of tracks between Lichfield and Armitage to four; later it was decided to extend this from Tamworth as well, giving four tracks throughout from Nuneaton to Colwich Junction, north of Rugeley. The two outer tracks are "slow", while the "fast" lines are the two innermost tracks.

Work started in 2004, and access roads were built on the eastern side of the line. Substantial earthworks were carried out and 37 bridges were replaced. A level crossing at Hademore was replaced by two road bridges in early 2007. The four-track railway between Lichfield North and Armitage was brought into use on 29 May 2008. Concurrently, Lichfield Trent Valley signal box was closed and within a month had been demolished. On 8 September the same year, the four-track railway between Tamworth and Lichfield came into use and Tamworth signal box closed.

Additionally, the line between Rugby and Brinklow, formerly three tracks, was quadrupled on 27 May 2008. The line from Brinklow to Nuneaton remains three tracks. A 2-mile (3.2 km) section north-west of Colwich Junction, which passes through the 776 yd (710 m) Shugborough Tunnel, remains double track.

As well as the civil engineering works, the whole of the Trent Valley line has been resignalled. The work was completed in September 2008, at a cost of around £350 million.

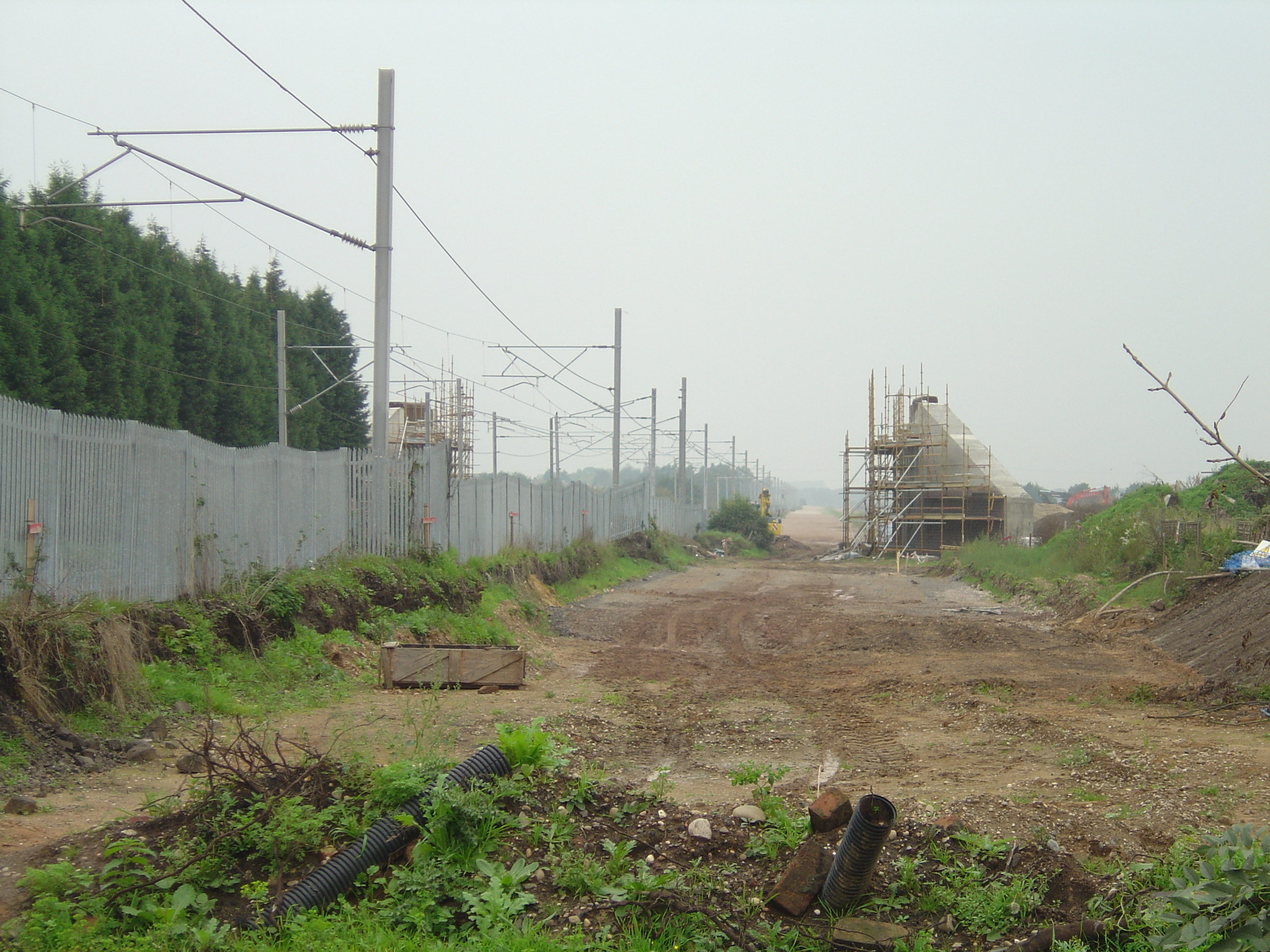
The Trent Valley line looking north from Hademore Crossing on 15 October 2006, showing the track bed for the new lines and works for the new bridge

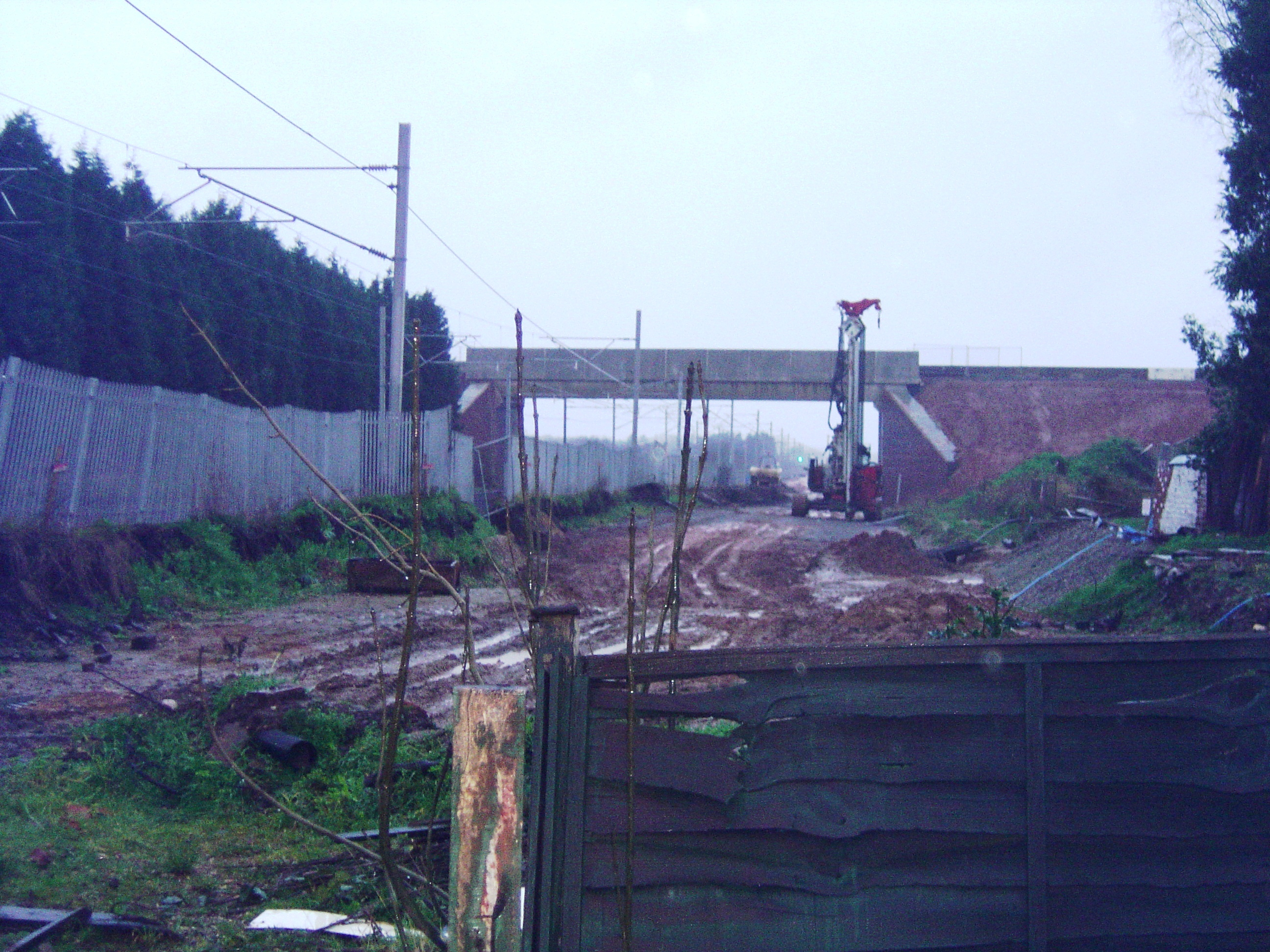
The same view on 7 January 2007, showing the newly opened bridge at Hademore

==== New rolling stock ====
Along with the modernisation improvements, new rolling stock operates along the Trent Valley line. Class 350 Desiro electric multiple units started operation on 11 December 2006. The Desiro trains replace the outdated passenger trains that previously ran on the line. They include more advanced features, such as 100 mph (160 km/h) running speeds; with all sets now running at 110 mph (180 km/h).

=== Accidents ===
Serious accidents which have occurred on the Trent Valley line include:

- 1860 – Atherstone rail accident; 10 killed. 13 injured.
- 1870 – Tamworth rail crash; 3 killed, 13 injured.
- 1946 – Lichfield rail crash; 20 killed, 21 injured.
- 1947 – Polesworth derailment; 5 killed, 64 injured.
- 1975 – Nuneaton rail crash; 6 killed, 38 injured.
- 1986 – Colwich rail crash; 1 killed, 75 injured.

== Sources ==
- The Railway Magazine, August 2006
- Railway Track Diagrams – Midlands & North West, ISBN 0-9549866-0-1
