= Brinklow (disambiguation) =

Brinklow may refer to:

Places

- Brinklow, a village in Warwickshire, England
  - Brinklow Castle, a castle in the north of the village of Brinklow, Warwickshire, England
- Brinklow, Milton Keynes, part of the civil parish of Kents Hill and Monkston in Milton Keynes, Buckinghamshire, England
- Brinklow, Maryland, a rural district in Montgomery County, Maryland, United States

People

- Roberta Brinklow, fictional character in James Hilton's novel Lost Horizon
- Henry Brinklow (d. 1545 or 1546), English polemicist who worked for a number of years under the pseudonym Roderyck, or Roderigo, Mors

== See also ==
- Binko (disambiguation)
- Brink (disambiguation)
- Rinko (disambiguation)
