= Brink of Disaster =

Brink of Disaster or variation, may refer to:

== Television ==
- "Brink of Disaster" (Thunderbirds episode), a 1966 episode of the marionette TV show Thunderbirds
- "The Brink of Disaster", a 1964 episode in the Doctor Who serial The Edge of Destruction

== Film ==
- "The Brink of Disaster" (film episode), a chapter of the 1936 film serial Shadow of Chinatown
- "The Brink of Disaster" (film episode), a chapter of the 1936 film serial The Phantom Rider (Universal serial)
- "The Brink of Disaster" (film episode), a chapter of the 1939 film serial The Oregon Trail (1939 serial)
- Brink of Disaster! (short film), a 1972 short film by John Florea

== Other uses ==
- Brink of Disaster, Meadow River, West Virginia, USA; a class 5 rapid
- "Brink of Disaster" (song), a 1967 single by Lesley Gore off the album Magic Colors; see Lesley Gore discography

== See also ==
- On the Brink of Destruction (album), a 2010 album by 'Tonic Breed'
- Brinksmanship or brinkmanship
- On the Brink (disambiguation)
- Disaster (disambiguation)
- Brink (disambiguation)
