= The Master of Disaster =

The disaster master or masters of disasters or variation, may refer to:

== People ==
- DJ Master of Disaster (DJ MOD), a Philippine disc jockey, see DMC World DJ Championships
- Master of Disaster (wrestler), a pro-wrestler from HoPWF Tag Team Championship
- The Master of Disaster (wrestler), a pro-wrestler from Smoky Mountain Wrestling, see List of former Smoky Mountain Wrestling personnel
- "Masters of Disaster", a moniker assigned to a pair of political operatives during the Clinton administration:
  - Mark D. Fabiani (born 1957)
  - Chris Lehane (born 1967)
- Irwin Allen (1916-1991), U.S. film producer nicknamed "Master of Disaster"
- Randall Bell, U.S. economist with the nickname "The Master of Disaster"
- Duane Peters (born 1961), U.S. punk rock musician nicknamed "The Master of Disaster"
- Jesse Robbins (born 1976), screen name "Master of Disaster", a U.S. technology entrepreneur
- Kim Stanley Robinson (born 1952), U.S. science fiction author nicknamed "The Master of Disaster"
- Samuel K. Skinner (born 1938), U.S. politician with the nickname "The Master of Disaster"
- JG Thirlwell (born 1960), Australian singer-songwriter nicknamed "Master of Disaster"
- Brandon Decker (born 1988), American artist and philosopher who maintains the persistent title of "Master of Disaster" across all organizations he has worked with.
- Roland Emmerich (born 1955), German-American filmmaker nicknamed "Master of Disaster"

=== Fictional characters ===
- "The Master of Disaster" (Rocky character), an epithet used by the Rocky franchise character Apollo Creed
- "Master of Disaster" (Hackers character), a screen name used by fictional character Joey Pardella from the 1995 film Hackers, see List of fictional hackers
- Masters of Disaster (comics), a DC Comics supervillain team

== Film ==
- The Masters of Disaster (1986 film), a U.S. short documentary film
- Treasure Hunters (film) aka Master of Disaster; a 1981 Hong Kong kung-fu comedy Shaw Brothers Studio film
- New Killers in Town (1980 film) aka New Kids in Town aka Master of Disaster (Chinese: 初到贵境), a 1980 Hong Kong film starring actress Moon Lee

== Music ==
- Master of Disaster (2005 album), a 2005 U.S. rock album by John Hiatt
- Master of Disaster (2001 record), a 2001 recording by German metal band Holy Moses
- Masters of Disaster (1986 record), a 1986 mixtape by The Icons from Green Monkey Records

=== Songs ===
- "Master of Disaster" (2011 song), a 2011 song by Seether off their 2011 album Holding Onto Strings Better Left to Fray
- "Master of Disaster" (2007 song), a 2007 song by U.D.O. off their 2007 album Mastercutor
- "Master Of Disaster" (2005 song), a 2005 song by Raging Speedhorn of their 2005 album How the Great Have Fallen

== Television ==
- Disaster Masters (2005 UK TV series), a 2005-2009 BBC TV show about Homeserve, an insurance repair company
- Masters of Disaster (TV series), a 2019 Discovery Channel USA TV series about an Appalachian company that makes and acquires things for doomsday preppers

=== TV episodes ===
- "Disaster Master" (TV episode), 1981 season 1 episode 9 of The Richie Rich/Scooby-Doo Show
- "Masters of Disasters" (TV episode), 2009 season 2 episode 10 number 36 of Total Drama Action, see List of Total Drama Action episodes
- "Masters of Disaster" (TV episode), 2009 episode 9 of Top Chef Masters (season 1)
- "Masters of Disasters" (TV episode), 2015 season 3 episode 11 number 49 of TruTV Top Funniest
- "Master of Disaster" (TV episode), 2016 episode of Atomic Puppet
- "Masters of Disasters" (TV episode), 2017 season 8 episode 10 of Outrageous Acts of Science
- "Master of Disaster" (TV episode), 2017 season 3 episode 39 number 138 of Yu-Gi-Oh! Arc-V, see List of Yu-Gi-Oh! Arc-V episodes

== Literature ==
- Master of Disaster: A Tale of Manifestation, Mayhem & Magic, a 1998 novel by U.S. author Jan Longwell-Smiley
- Masters of Disasters Mysteries, a mystery novel series by U.S. author Carole Marsh
- Moody: Master of Disaster (2015 book), a children's novel by U.S. author Megan McDonald
- Master of Disaster (2016 compilation), a 2016 omnibus comic book volume of Bart Simpsons comics, see List of The Simpsons comics
- Middle School: Master of Disaster (2020 book), a children's novel by Christopher Tebbets and James Patterson, see James Patterson bibliography

== Other uses ==
- Masters of Disaster (airshow team), a U.S. aerobatics display team

== See also ==
- Master Disaster (fictional character), a character from Transformers: Animated, see List of Transformers: Animated characters
- "Master & Disaster" (TV episode), a 2005 season 3 episode 11 number 37 of Duck Dodgers, see List of Duck Dodgers episodes
- "The Master's Disaster" (TV episode), episode 49 from 2012 of Judge John Hodgman
- Disaster (disambiguation)
- Master (disambiguation)
