= The Brink =

The Brink may refer to:

- The Brink (2017 film), a Hong Kong action film
- The Brink (2019 film), a documentary film
- The Brink (The Jezabels album), a 2013 album by The Jezabels
- The Brink (TV series), an American comedy television series
- The Brink, a 2011 album by Alternative 4
- The Brink, a research news publication from Boston University

== See also ==
- Brink (disambiguation)
- On the Brink (disambiguation)
