= Death in Small Doses =

Death in Small Doses may refer to:

- Death in Small Doses (1957 film), by Joseph M. Newman
- Death in Small Doses (1995 film), by Sondra Locke
- "Ring Once for Death", released in the United States as "Death in Small Doses", a 1974 episode of the British series Thriller
- "Death in Small Doses", a song from Tonic Breed's 2010 album On the Brink of Destruction
