= On the Brink =

On the Brink may refer to:

- On the Brink (painting), an 1864 painting by Alfred Elmore
- On the Brink (board game), a 2009 expansion for Pandemic
- "On the Brink" (Spooks), a television episode
- On the Brink, a 1911 film directed by Edwin S. Porter
- On the Brink, a 1978 novel by Ben Stein
- On the Brink, a 2003 film narrated by David Attenborough
- On the Brink, a 2008 album by the Thirst
- On the Brink: Inside the Race to Stop the Collapse of the Global Financial System, a 2011 memoir by Henry Paulson

== See also ==
- On the Brink of Destruction (album), a 2010 album by 'Tonic Breed'
- Brinksmanship or brinkmanship
- Brink of Disaster (disambiguation)
- Brink (disambiguation)
