= Alfred Elmore =

English painter (1815–1881)

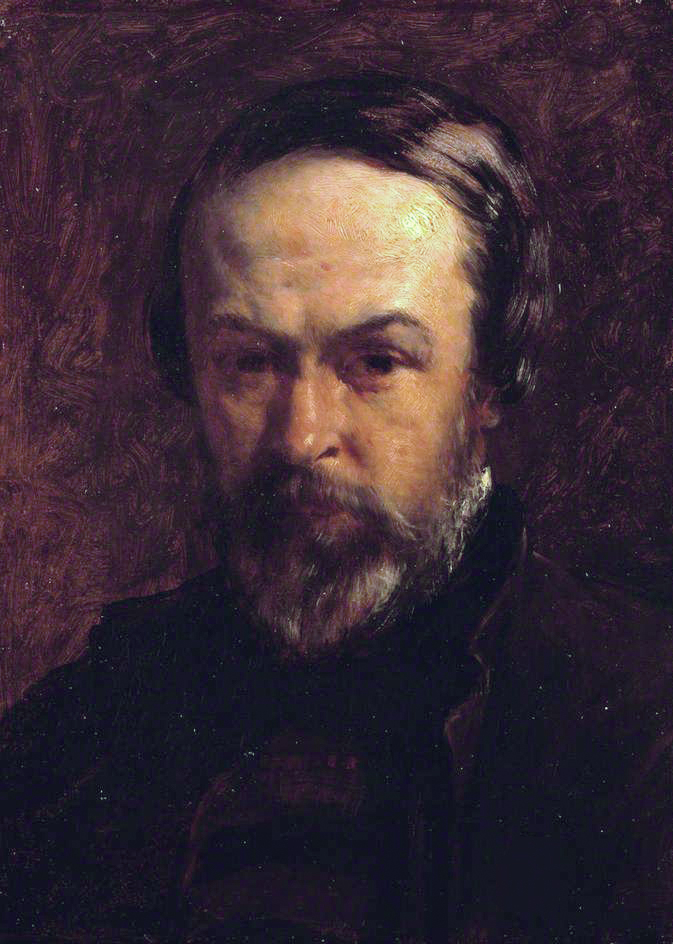
Self portrait (1860s)

Alfred Elmore RA (1815 – 1881) was a British history and genre painter.

== Life ==
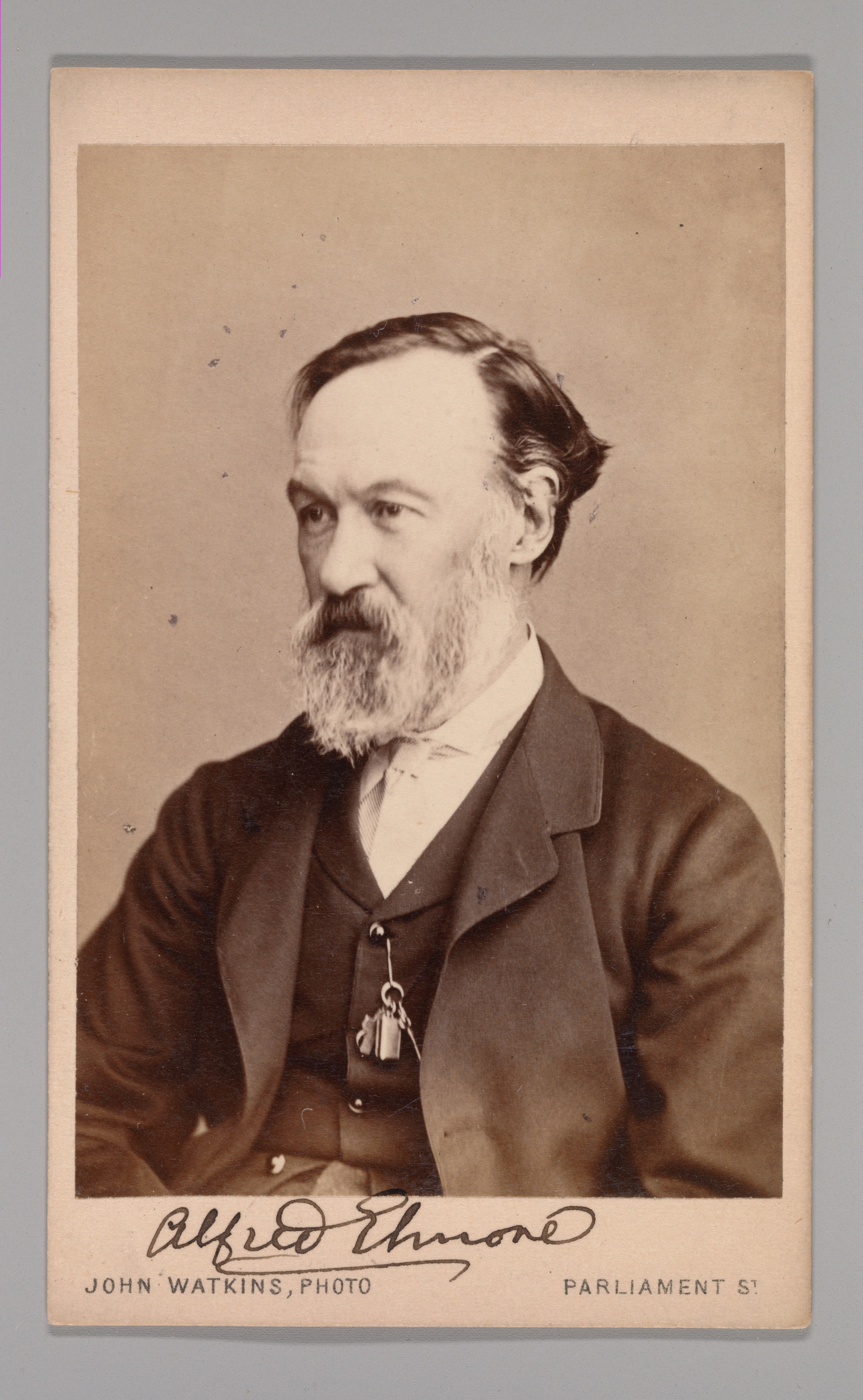
Albumen silver print (1860s)

Alfred Elmore was born in Clonakilty, Ireland, the son of John Richard Elmore, a surgeon who retired from the British Army to Clonakilty. His family moved to London, where Elmore studied at the Royal Academy of Arts. His early works were in the troubadour style of Richard Parkes Bonington, but he soon graduated to religious work, notably The Martyrdom of Thomas à Becket, commissioned by Daniel O'Connell for Westland Row Church in Dublin. Between 1840 and 1844, Elmore travelled across Europe, visiting Munich, Venice, Bologna, and Florence.

Elmore seems to have been associated with The Clique, a group of young artists who saw themselves as followers of Hogarth and David Wilkie. According to his friend William Powell Frith he was member of the group, but since it was most active while he was in continental Europe, his involvement was probably short-lived.

Most of Elmore's later works were historical narrative paintings. Religious Controversy and The Novice were implicitly anti-Catholic in character. Other paintings set episodes from Shakespeare, or the history of the French Revolution. They often contained subtle explorations of the process of creation, most importantly his two paintings about technological innovation, The Invention of the Stocking Loom (1847, Nottingham Castle Museum) and The Invention of the Combing Machine (1862, Cartwright Hall, Bradford). Both portray the process of industrialisation by depicting picturesque pre-industrial handicrafts. The inventor is supposed to be pondering these manual skills while he forms in his mind a mechanism to replace them.

Elmore's best-known work is On the Brink (1865; Fitzwilliam Museum, Cambridge), a moral genre painting depicting a young woman who has lost her money gambling, and is 'on the brink' of responding to the blandishments of a seducer, who is depicted as a satan-like figure, luridly bathed in red light, and whispering corrupting thoughts in her ear.

By the late 1860s, Elmore was moving away from such Hogarthian subjects towards a more classical style influenced by Edward Poynter and Lawrence Alma-Tadema. He also painted Arabic figures, in line with the vogue for Orientalism in art.

Elmore suffered from neuralgia through much of his life, and in his later years he became lame following a bad fall from his horse. He died of cancer in January 1881 and was buried in Kensal Green cemetery in London.

== Gallery ==
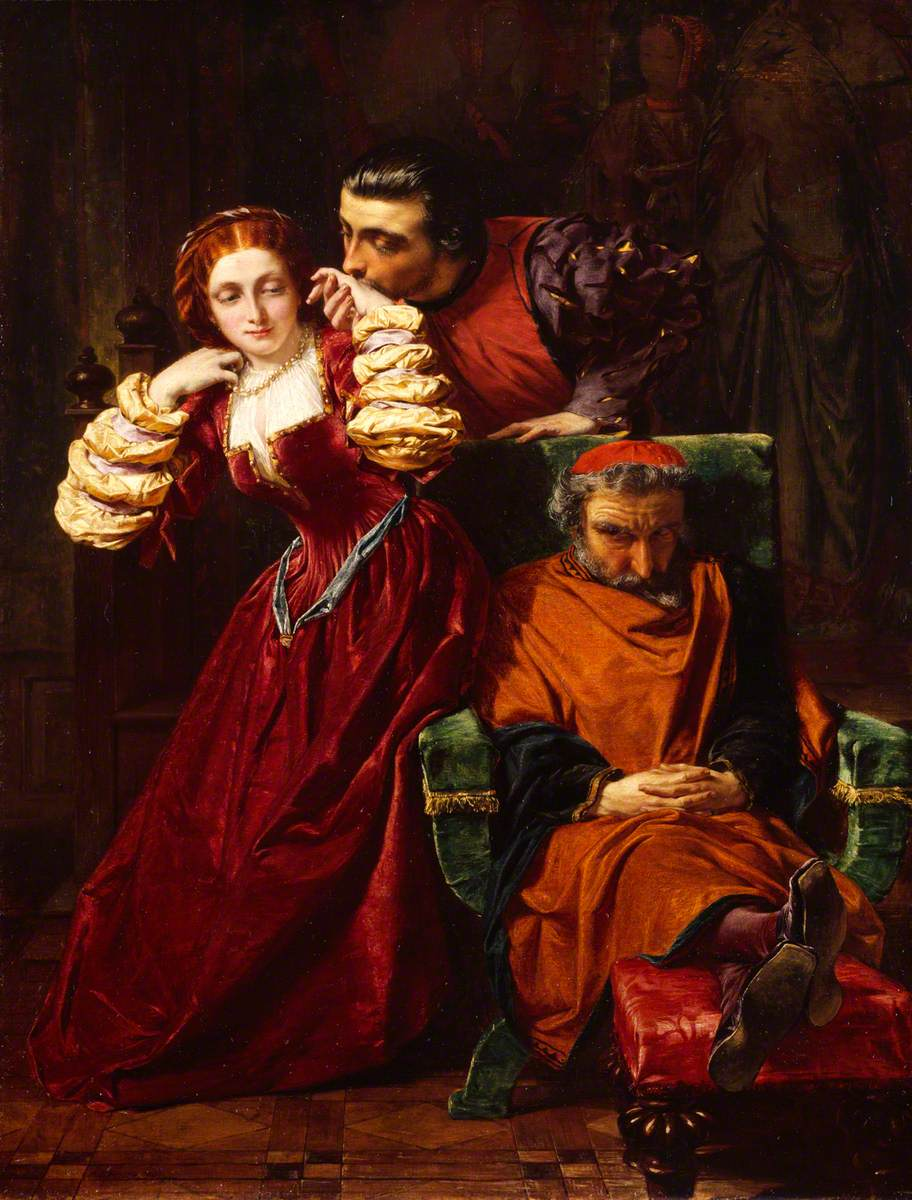
Scene from The Two Gentlemen of Verona (1857)

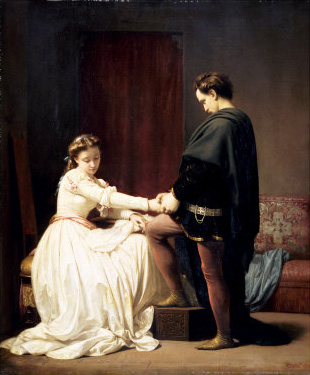
The Proposal (1860)

Peace, 1651 (1861)

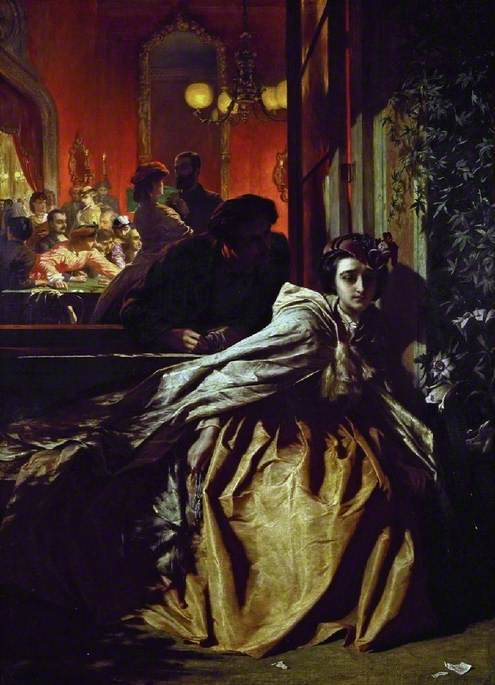
On the Brink (1864)

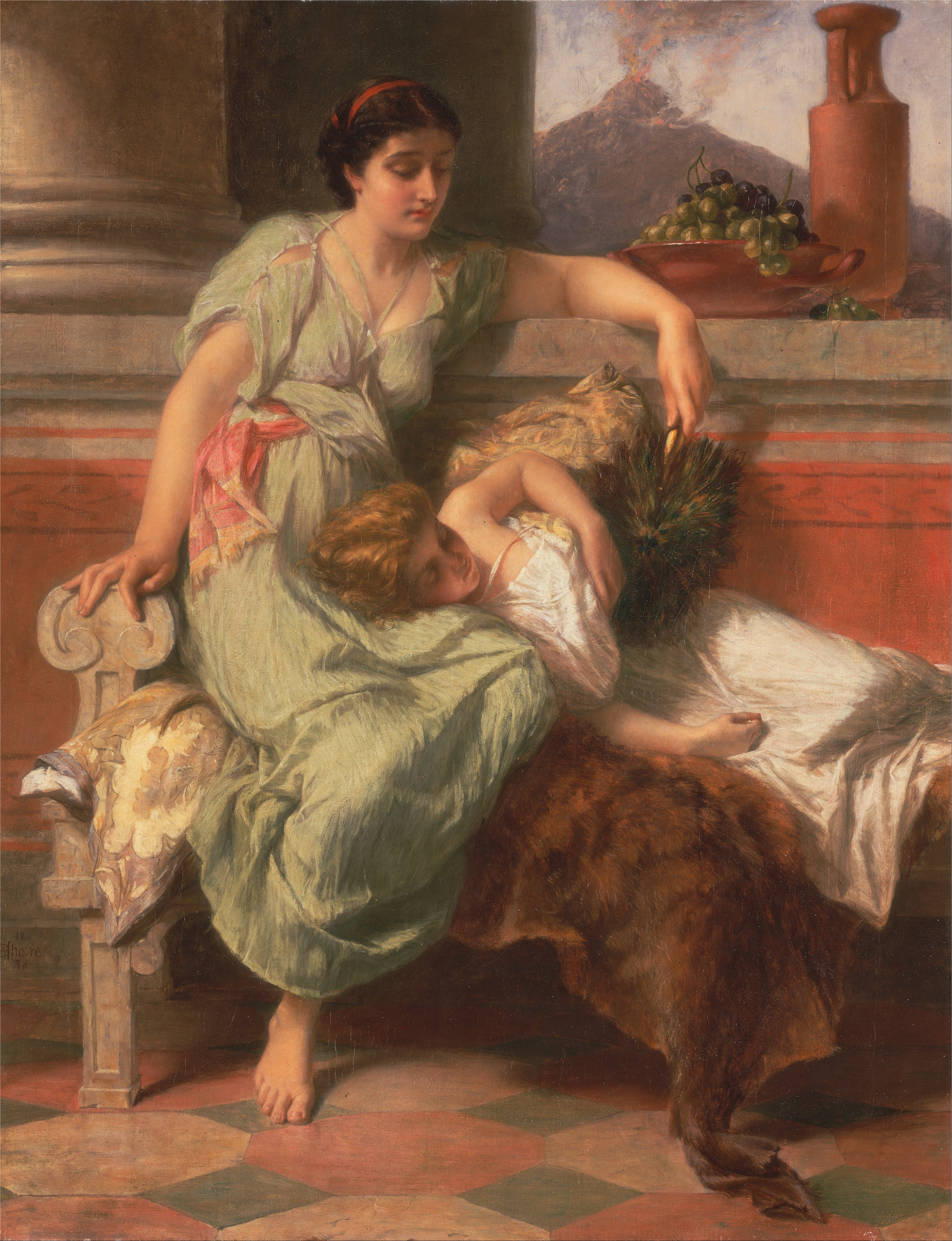
Pompeii, A.D. 79 (1878)
