= Outsold =

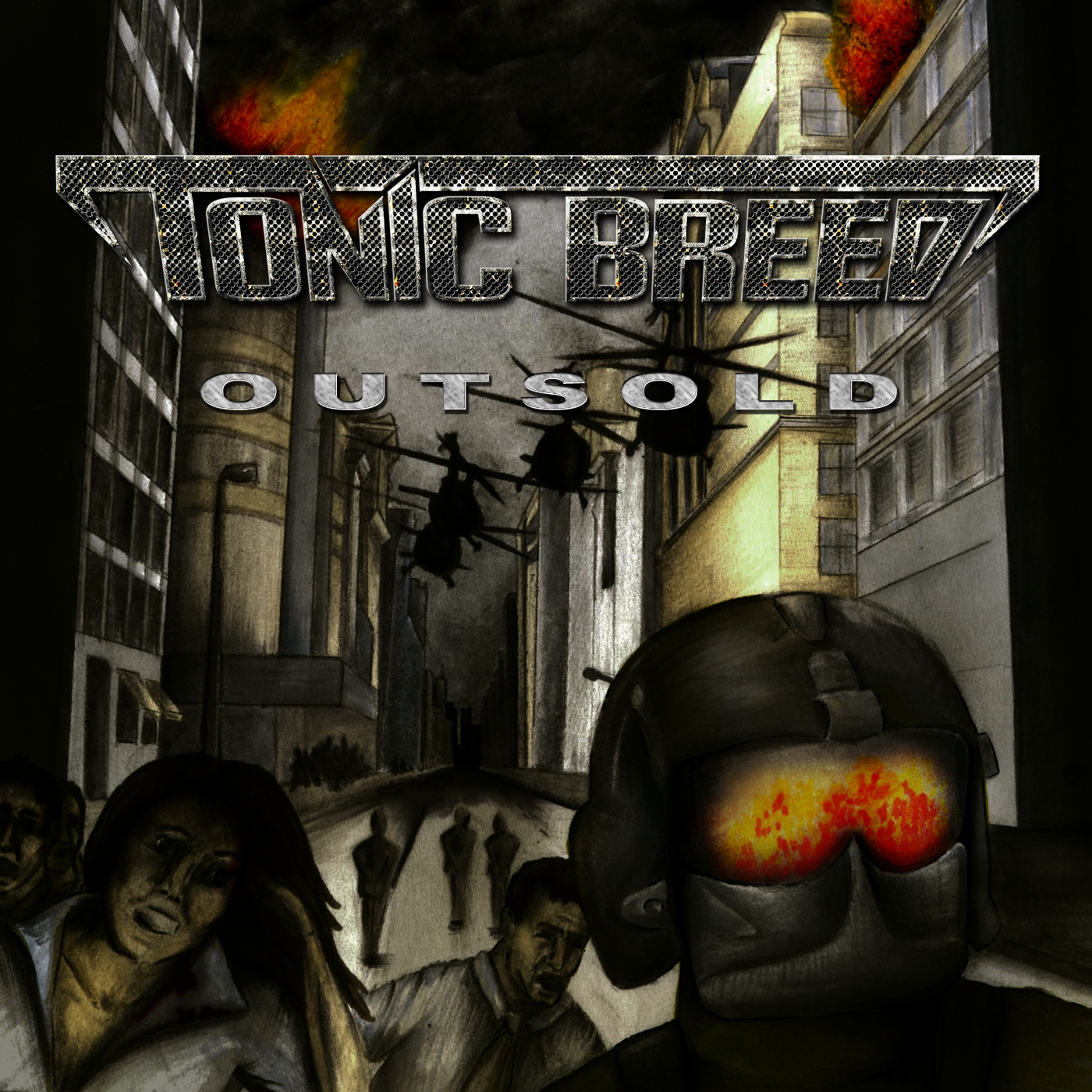

Studio album by Tonic Breed
- Released: April 28, 2014
- Recorded: November 1 to December 20, 2013 at Lydlageret Studios in Sarpsborg, Norway
- Genres: Heavy Metal, Thrash Metal, Groove Metal
- Length: 54:43
- Label: Independent
- Producers: Patrik Svendsen, Lars Andresen

Tonic Breed chronology
On the Brink of Destruction (2010)	Outsold (2014)	Install Memory (2018)

Professional ratings
Review scores
Source	Rating
Metalstorm	7.1/10 stars
Melodic	4/5 stars
Metal-temple.com	9/10 stars
Heavymetal.no	3/4 stars

Outsold is the second studio album by Norwegian heavy metal band Tonic Breed. It was released on April 28, 2014. Outsold was the first album by Tonic Breed to feature Thomas Koksvik and Mats Johansen.

== Background and recording ==
In the fall of 2011, Tonic Breed joined a live competition in Sarpsborg, Norway. Tonic Breed won it, and the prize was a given recording time at Lydlageret Studios, Sarpsborg. At that time, Tonic Breed had barely started writing new songs after their first release, so they put the studio on hold.

In November 2013, Tonic Breed started recording their second studio album, Outsold, in Lydlageret studio in Sarpsborg. They finished the recording mid December. The studio tech in Lydlageret was Lars Andresen and the album was pre-mixed by Patrik Svendsen and Andresen. The album was then sent to Toproom Studios, Norway, to do the final mix and mastering.

Sound engineer at Toproom Studios was Børge Finstad.

== Music videos ==
A week after the album release, the third song on the album, Bad Company, was released with its own first music video. The video includes both video material directed by Patrik Svendsen, and animation made by Ole Andersen.

In May 2015, Tonic Breed released a second music video to the song, Strife. It was directed by Oscar Birk. The video was the first project to involve new lead guitarist, Jørgen Abrahamsen. On drums were Niklas Skjelin as a guest appearance.

In late January 2016, Tonic Breed released "Fifth Estate" as the third and last music video from the "Outsold" album. It was directed by Oscar Birk. The video was the first project since 2012 to involve Daniel Pettersen on drums.

== Track listing ==
No.	Title	Music	Lyrics	Length
1.	"Strife"	Patrik Svendsen	Mats Johansen	6:06
2.	"Fifth Estate"	Svendsen	Svendsen, Johansen	6:25
3.	"Bad Company"	Svendsen	Svendsen	6:41
4.	"Blackened Mind"	Svendsen	Svendsen, Johansen	7:38
5.	"Outsold"	Svendsen	Svendsen	7:07
6.	"Rebellious Tendencies"	Svendsen	Svendsen	6:41
7.	"Borregaard"	Svendsen	Instrumental	8:11
8.	"There's Just One Escape"	Svendsen	Svendsen, Johansen	5:54
Total length:				54:43

== Personnel ==
=== Tonic Breed ===
- Patrik Svendsen – Lead Vocals, Rhythm Guitar
- Rudi Golimo – Bass guitar, Backing Vocals
- Thomas Koksvik – Lead Guitar, Backing Vocals
- Mats Johansen – Drums

=== Technical Personnel ===
- Patrik Svendsen And Lars Andresen – Producer, Mixing
- Børge Finstad – Engineer
- Anne Marthe Strand – Cover Illustration

=== Guests ===
- Andreas Nergård – Orchestration Intro On "Strife"
