= Rinko =

Rinko can refer to:

== People ==
- Rinko Kawauchi (川内 倫子; born 1972), Japanese photographer
- Rinko Kikuchi (菊地 凛子; born 1981), Japanese actress
- Rinko Kimino (君野 倫子), Japanese author about kimono, zakka and kabuki
- Rinko Ueda (上田 倫子), Japanese manga artist
- Rinko Sakata (坂田 倫子), Japanese table tennis player

== Characters ==
- Rinko Yamato, a character from the manga series My Love Story!!
- Rinko Kuzaki, a character from the manga series Omamori Himari
- Rinko Kougyoku, a character from the anime Jewelpet
- Rinko Kobayakawa, a character from the anime LovePlus
- Rinko, a character from the anime Ghostwire: Tokyo
- Rinko Shirokane, a character from the series BanG Dream!
- Rinko Akaishi, a character from the manga series Kaiju Girl Caramelise
- Rinko Nikaidō, a character from the series Ultimate Muscle
- Rinko Mishima, a character from the series Yume Tsukai
- Rinko Tatsumi, a character from the movie A Snake of June
- Rinko Jerrard, a character from the manga series The Law of Ueki
- Rinko Takemichi, a character from the anime Joran: The Princess of Snow and Blood
- Rinko Takeuchi, a character from the anime The Prince of Tennis
- Rinko Daimon, a character from the series Kamen Rider Wizard
- Rinko Sakuma, a character from the manga series You're Being Summoned, Azazel
- Rinko Matsubaro, a character from the movie Lost Paradise
- Rinko Kamata, a character from the manga series Tokyo Tarareba Girls
- Rinko, a character from the movie Close-Knit
- Rinko Tamaki, a character from the anime Natsuiro Kiseki
- Rinko Ogasawara, a character from the anime Shirobako
- Rinko, a character from the movie Linda Linda Linda
- Rinko Inui, a character from the manga series Aho-Girl
- Rinko Koujiro, a character from the light novel Sword Art Online
- Rinko Hayashi, a voice actress who voiced the character of Marianne from the television drama series Winter Sonata
- Rinko Ozaki, a character from the manga series Purple Eyes in the Dark
- Rinko Sudou, a character in manga series Haikyū!!, the position is Captain and number is 5
- Rinko, a character from the movie Love and Goodbye and Hawaii
- Rinko Iori, a character from the anime Gundam Build Fighters
