= Tonic Breed =

Norwegian heavy metal band

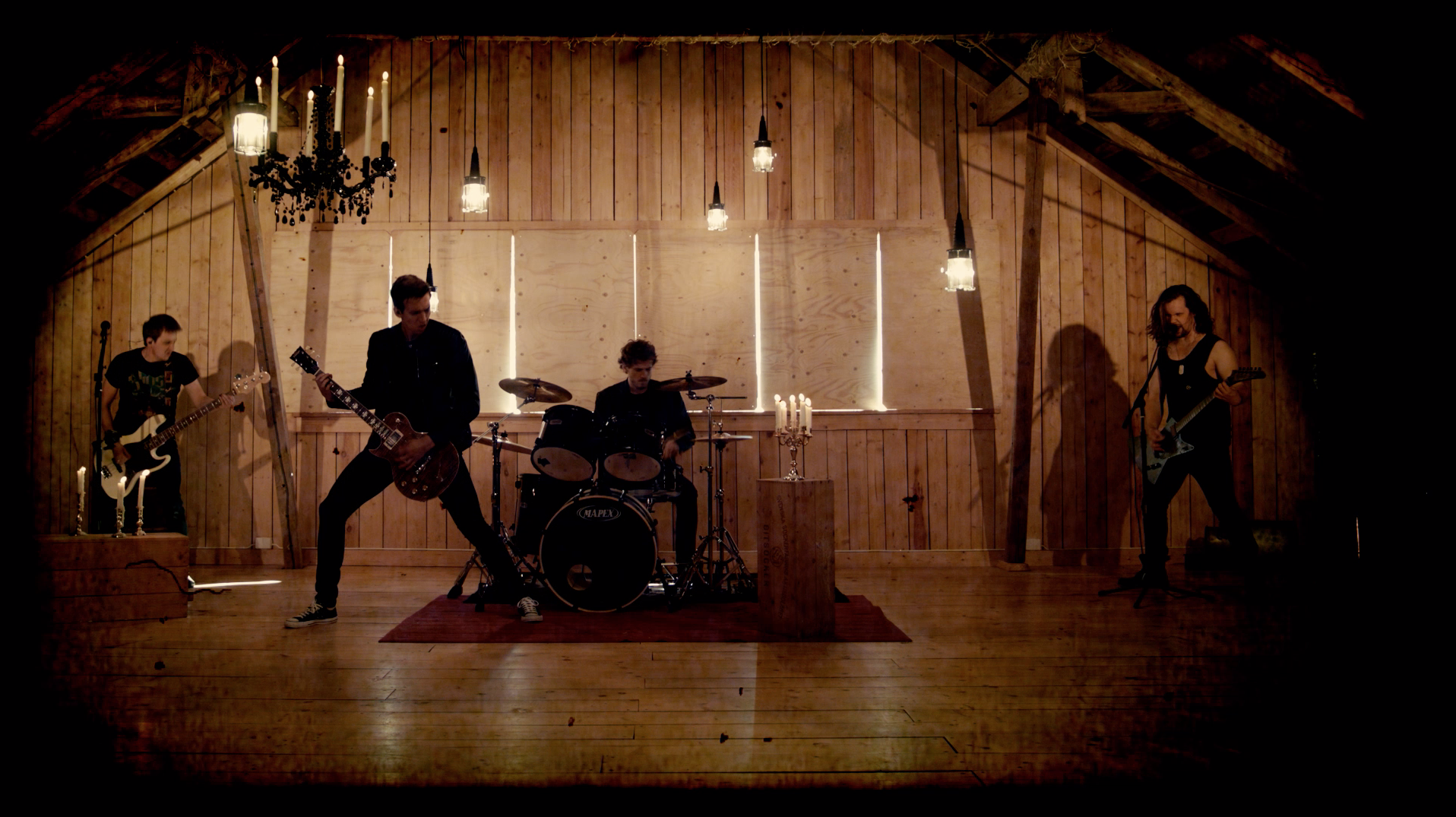

Background information
- Origin: Sarpsborg, Østfold, Norway
- Genres: Thrash metal, heavy metal, groove metal
- Years active: 2006–present
- Label: Independent
- Members: Patrik Svendsen
- Past members: Bjørn Myhren; Daniel Pettersen; Anders Bekken; Thomas Koksvik; Mats Johansen; Rudi Golimo; Jørgen Abrahamsen; Ole Danielsen
- Website: tonicbreed.com

Tonic Breed is a Norwegian thrash and heavy metal one-man music project by Patrik K. Svendsen. Until 2019, Tonic Breed was originally a four-piece band, established in Sarpsborg, Norway, in 2006. As of 2022, Tonic Breed has released three albums, and one EP. The latest release, Fuel the Fire, involves multiple guest artists as part of a re-branding of the concept.

== History ==
=== Formation and early years (2003–2009) ===
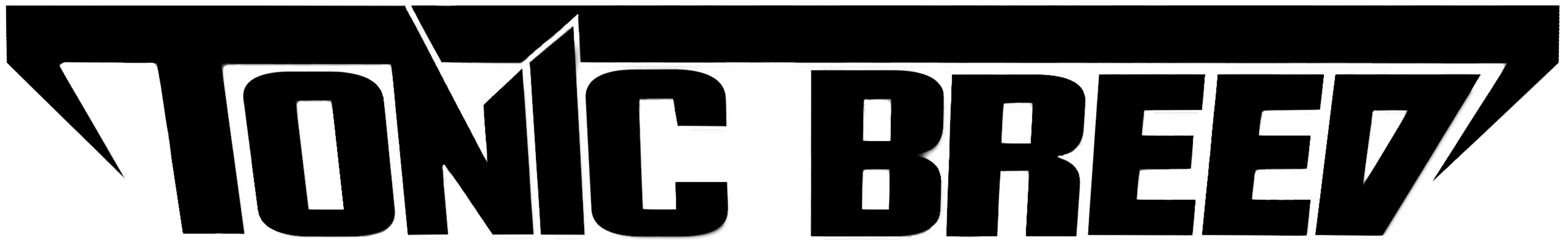
Original Tonic Breed logo

In 2003, Patrik Svendsen and Bjørn Myhren got to know each other when they found out they shared the same interest in music. They were classmates and so was Rudi Golimo. In 2006, Svendsen and Myhren started playing together, both of them guitar. Golimo wanted to join in as well, and by Svendsen and Myhren's request, he bought a bass guitar. They had a lot of tryouts with different drummers in a period of time. It was first when the three of them met Daniel Pettersen they considered themself as a full band for the first time. The first rehearsal with this four-man lineup was in September 2006. The band then started practice in Pettersen's garage.

Golimo had for a long time speculated in a proper band name. He had a strong wish to name the band Roadkill, which became the band name for over a year.

Roadkill played their first time live performance ever at an audition in 2008. The winner of the audition won a gig at a local festival in Sarpsborg, called "Bedemarten". The audition setlist contained two songs: The band's first single, "Don't Fail Again", and Metallica's "Sanitarium". Roadkill was the victorious band. Roadkill's first real gig was at "Bedemarten festival", 28 August 2008, in front of 200 people.

Roadkill changed their name to Tonic Breed in the fall of 2008. Tonic Breed released their first demos in November 2008. The singles contained early versions of "Oblivion" and "Don't Fail Again", which later appeared on the band's upcoming 2010 album release.

30 May 2009, Tonic Breed won a live competition. The first prize was a studio recording. At that point, Tonic Breed did not have enough songs to make a whole album. It was not before the year after that Tonic Breed could enter the studio to make their first album.

=== On the Brink of Destruction (2010–2011) ===
Recorded in Fredrikstad, Norway, Tonic Breed's first album release was On the Brink of Destruction. It had its release 24 November 2010. The mixing and mastering were done by Lasse Jensen. Just a few days after the last recording day, Bjørn Myhren left the band. Anders Bekken replaced Myhren as the new lead guitarist, the same month as the album was released. Bekken joined numerous concerts until he quit in the middle of 2011 because of duty in the Norwegian army.

Tonic Breed continued playing concerts, and former guitarist Bjørn Myhren stepped in to help the band for a short time. One of the concerts Myhren played was the Global Battle of the Bands local semi-finals. Tonic Breed with guest guitarist Bjørn Myhren managed to qualify for the national finals of the competition. Just a few weeks later, Tonic Breed joined yet another competition, this time a local one in Sarpsborg. Tonic Breed won the competition, and the prize was a good amount of studio time in "Lydlageret" Studio in Sarpsborg. This is the main reason Tonic Breed ended up recording their second studio album in that particular studio. Although the studio was ready, Tonic Breed was not ready for the studio. The band had no new songs ready to record at that time and had to put the recording process on hold.

=== "Impossible is Nothing" and Thomas Koksvik (2012) ===
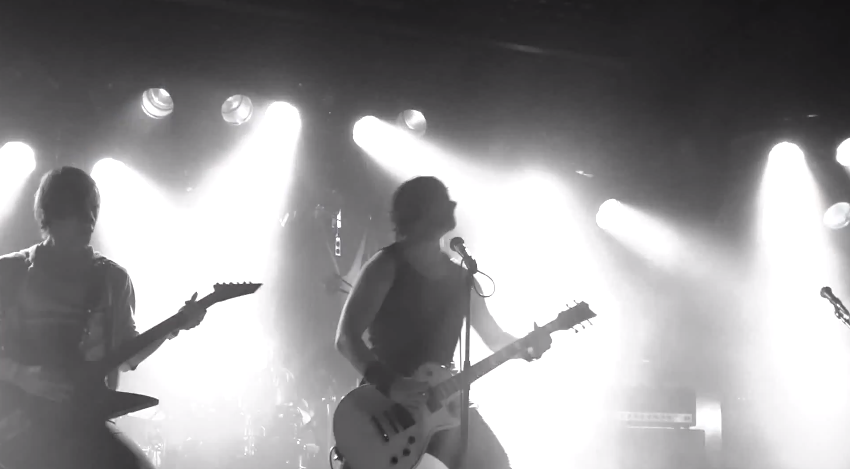
Tonic Breed playing at Global Battle of the Bands in 2012

A newly mastered, and slightly remixed version of "Death in Small Doses" was made by Beau Hill in March 2012. That version of the song was titled "Death in Small Doses (Put to Death)".

Thomas Koksvik took place as the new lead guitarist in early 2012. Koksvik and Svendsen knew each other from Trøndertun Folk High School in Trondheim. Shortly after Koksvik arrived, the band played the national Global Battle of the Bands final in Oslo, which did not end in success for Tonic Breed. Pettersen decided later on to move to Rena in Norway, to finish his school education. Within this time, with a band member short, Tonic Breed did a lot of songwriting while looking for a new drummer. While writing new songs, the band did their first music video for their latest single release, "Impossible is Nothing". The drums on the song were done by Paal Johannesen, vocalist in the hardcore band "Bits Between". In the music video, Tobias Lundblad from "Springskalle" stepped in as a guest performer.

=== Outsold (2013–2016) ===
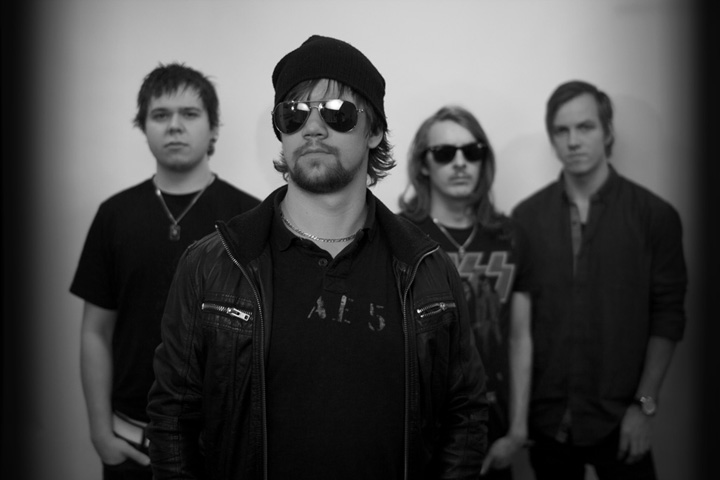
Tonic Breed lineup 2014

Five different drummers were in for tryouts with Tonic Breed in 2012 and 2013. It was Mats Johansen who suited Tonic Breed the best. The audition song for all the drummers was a song with the working title "Implosion". That song later got a new name, "Fifth Estate" and ended on their upcoming album.

Tonic Breed recorded their second studio album, Outsold, in September 2013. The album was recorded and pre-mixed by Patrik Svendsen and Lars Andresen at Lydlageret Studio in Sarpsborg. The last part of the mix was done by Børge Finstad at Toproom Studio, Norway. The album had its release on 28 April 2014.

Shortly after, the third track of the album, Bad Company, got its own music video. The video was animated by Ole Andersen and directed by Patrik Svendsen.

By Norwegian radio program P3 Pyro, Tonic Breed was picked out as one of Norway's most promising bands of 2014.

Tonic Breed released a music video to the song "Strife", in May 2015. This was the first project to include lead guitarist, Jørgen Abrahamsen.

In January 2016, Tonic Breed released a music video to the song "Fifth Estate", which became the third and last music video from the "Outsold" album. It was directed by Oscar Birk. The video was the first project since 2012 to involve Daniel Pettersen on drums.

In November 2016 the band performed their 10th-anniversary concert while wearing the business suits from the "Fifth Estate" music video.

=== Install Memory (2017–2019) ===
In June 2017, Tonic Breed signed with Rob Mules records. Anders L. Rasmussen stated to Eternal Terror Magazine that Tonic Breed was a band they really wanted to sign in the future before the signing was official. In August 2017, Ole Danielsen officially replaced Daniel Pettersen on drums after rehearsing with the band for a few months.

On 14 September 2018, along with Rob Mules Records, Tonic Breed released their third album Install Memory. This was the first time to feature Jørgen Abrahamsen and Ole Danielsen on a release. The EP was followed up by five music videos. Music videos for the songs Install Memory, Crypto Knight, Mummy Dust and Overkill was directed by Svendsen and filmed by Oscar Birk. Don't Panic is an animated music video directed by Svendsen and illustrated by Sergio Cosme.

Tonic Breed signed with Live Wire Booking on 4 March 2019.

According to a Facebook post on Tonic Breed's official website, January 2021, Tonic Breed split up in late 2019. Svendsen then re-branded the band into a one-man music project.

=== New Era (2021–present) ===
On 29 January 2021, Patrik released his first single through the new version of Tonic Breed. The song was called H.E. Antagonist, with Oliver Palotai from Kamelot as a guest appearance on guitar. Later, a new single called No Rocks on the Scotch was released along with Soilwork vocalist, Björn Strid and Martin Skriubakken. A melodic piece, Blood Moon, was released 26 May. On this day, there was an actual lunar eclipse happening.

On 21 July 2022, the new song Fuel the Fire was released. This song was the fourth and last installment to be added to the EP of the same name, which was released the day after. Dirk Verbeuren from Megadeth and Wig Wam-bassist Bernt Jansen is featured on the latest single, which Svendsen describes as a song that repeats itself twice with two different endings.

== Band members ==
Current members

- Patrik Svendsen – lead vocals, rhythm guitar (2006–present)

Former members

- Bjørn Myhren – lead guitar, backing vocals (2006–2010)
- Daniel Pettersen – drums (2006–2012, 2015–2017)
- Anders Bekken – lead guitar, backing vocals (2010–2011)
- Thomas Koksvik – lead guitar, backing vocals (2012–2014)
- Mats Johansen – drums (2013−2014)
- Rudi Golimo – bass, backing vocals (2006–2019)
- Jørgen Abrahamsen – lead guitar, backing vocals (2015–2019)
- Ole Danielsen – drums (2017–2019)

== Discography ==
Studio albums

- On the Brink of Destruction (2010)
- Outsold (2014)
- Install Memory (2018)

EP's

- "Fuel the Fire" (2022)

Singles

- "Death in Small Doses (Put to Death)" (2012)
- "Impossible is Nothing" (2012)

Music videos

- Impossible is Nothing (2012)
- Bad Company (2014)
- Strife (2015)
- Fifth Estate (2016)
- Install Memory (2018)
- Overkill (2018)
- Mummy Dust (2018)
- Don't Panic! (2018)
- Crypto Knight (2019)
- H.E. Antagonist (2021)
- No Rocks on the Scotch (2021)
- Blood Moon (2021)
- Fuel the Fire (2023)
