= Brinklow Castle =

- Brinklow, Warwickshire, England
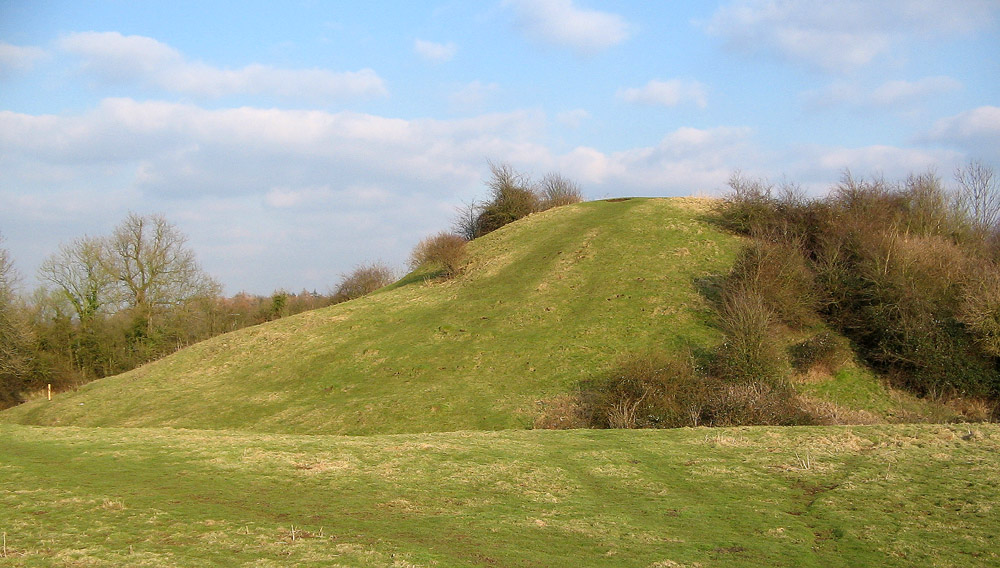
- Earthworks of Brinklow Castle

Site information
- Type: Motte and bailey
- Condition: Earthworks

Location
- Shown within Warwickshire, England
- Coordinates: 52.4127°N 1.3575°W
- Grid reference: grid reference SP438796

Site history
- Built: late 11th century
- Demolished: [No earlier than] 13th century

Brinklow Castle, known locally as the Tump, is a medieval castle in the village of Brinklow in the county of Warwickshire between Coventry and Rugby.

== History ==
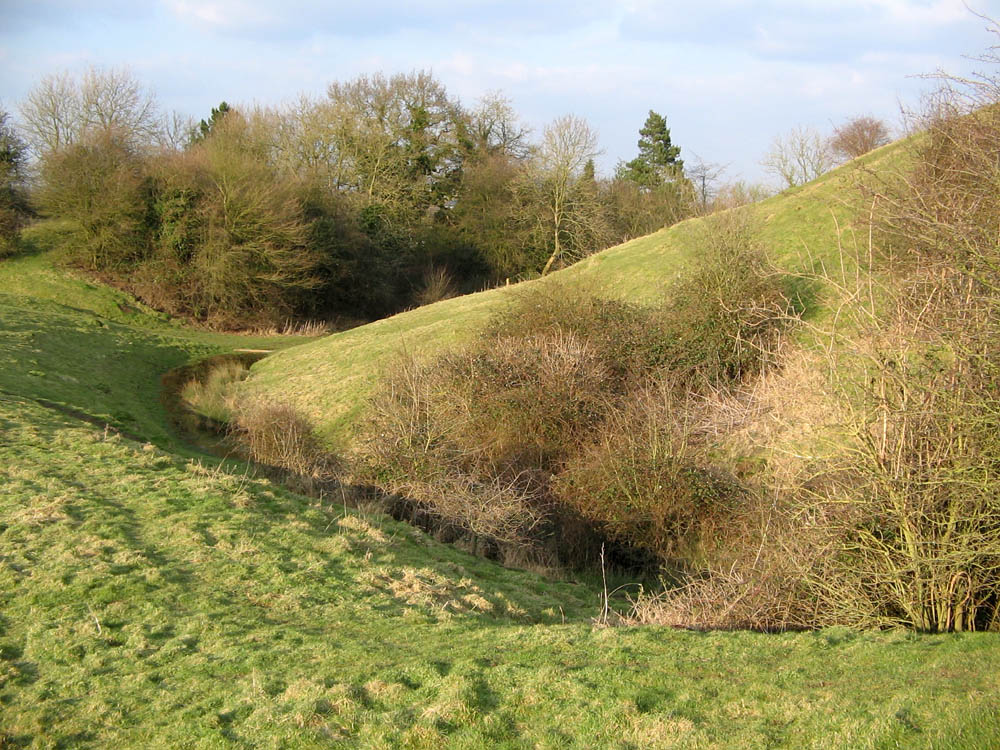
The defensive ditch surrounding the mound

Brinklow seems to have first been used as a prehistoric barrow, hence the old English 'hlāw' in the name Brinklow. It was later modified during the late 11th century by Aubrey de Coucy, the first Norman lord of Brinklow, but he left his Earldom in Northumbria and thus lost his lands in England before the writing of the Domesday Book of 1086. However his land and title had not been reassigned by the time of the Domesday survey, so there is a good record of his land holdings. The castle was abandoned during the 13th century for unknown reasons.

Brinklow Castle is a motte-and-bailey castle of grand size: the motte is 12 m high and its original bailey was 121m wide by 152m long. Later it seems that Brinklow's bailey was modified to enclose a smaller area by cutting a ditch and forming a rampart in the middle of the bailey; this seems to suggest that Brinklow slowly declined.

== See also ==
- Castles in Great Britain and Ireland
- List of castles in England

== Bibliography ==
- Creighton C, 2002: Castles and Landscapes Power, Community and Fortification in Medieval England. Equinox, Great Britain
- Chatwin P, 1955: "Brandon Castle, Warwickshire, Birmingham and Warwickshire Archaeology", Society, 73, 63–83
- Holt, J. 1972: "Politics and Property in Early Medieval England", Past & Present, 57, 3–52
- Williams A (Ed), Martin GH (Ed), 2003: Domesday book, A complete Translation. Penguin books, England
