= Brinklow =

Village in Warwickshire, England

Coordinates: 52.40909°N 1.36342°W

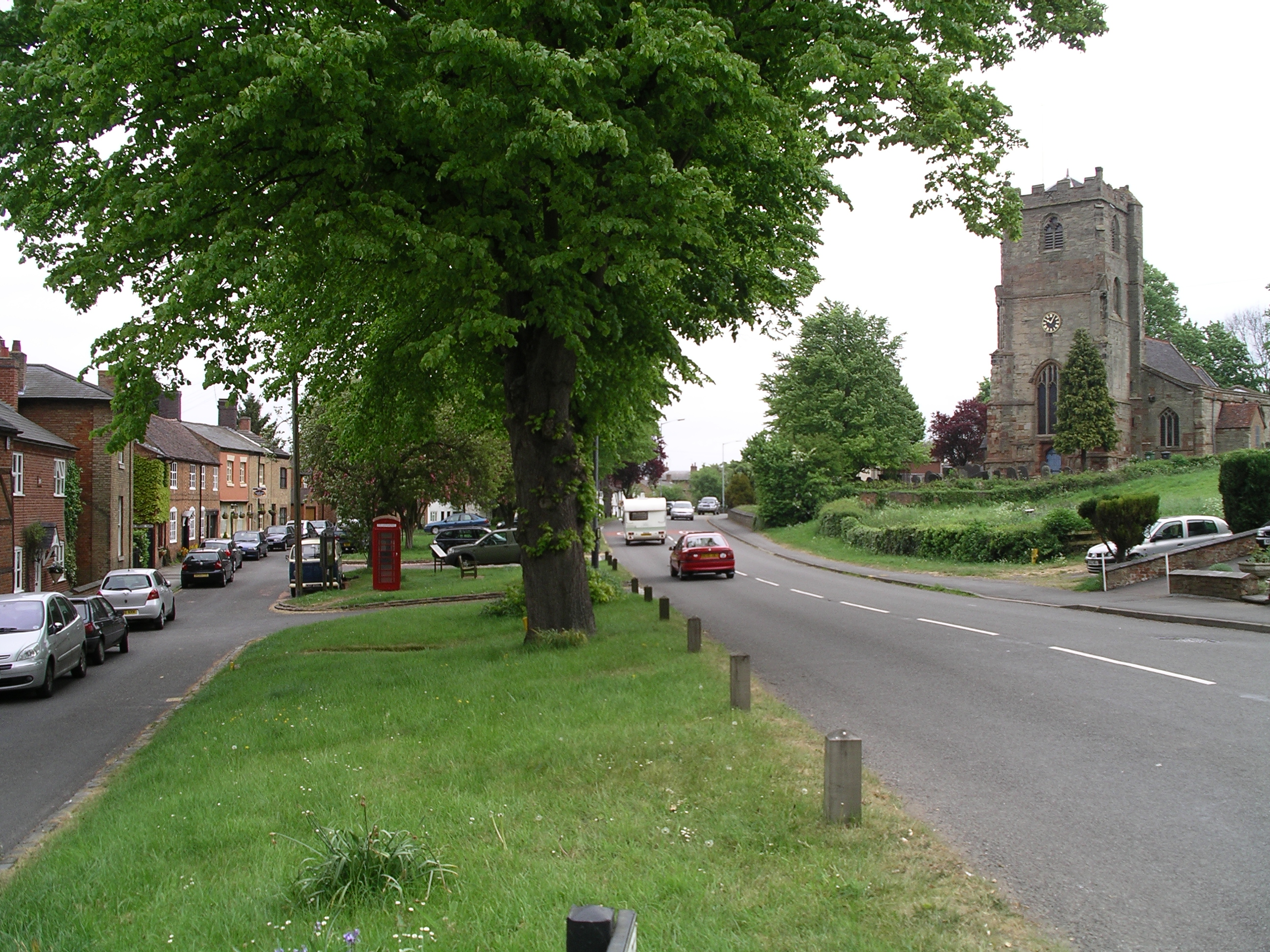
- The church of St John the Baptist adjoining the main road in Brinklow

- Location within Warwickshire
- Population: 1,120 (2021)
- OS grid reference: SP434792
- Civil parish: Brinklow
- District: Rugby
- Shire county: Warwickshire
- Region: West Midlands
- Country: England
- Sovereign state: United Kingdom
- Post town: RUGBY
- Postcode district: CV23
- Dialling code: 01788
- Police: Warwickshire
- Fire: Warwickshire
- Ambulance: West Midlands
- UK Parliament: Rugby

Brinklow is a village and civil parish in the Rugby district of Warwickshire, England. It is about halfway between Rugby and Coventry. The parish had a population of 1,120 at the 2021 Census.

Brinklow is an ancient settlement located on the Fosse Way former roman road, it is most well known for the large earthwork remains of Brinklow Castle.

== History ==
The village likely has ancient origins as there was a pre-Roman burial mound located here, which the Romans diverted their Fosse Way road around. The mound later became a Norman motte-and-bailey castle (Brinklow Castle, known locally as The Tump or the Big Hill), which is one of the largest and best preserved of its type in England.

Brinklow was not mentioned in the Domesday Book, as it was likely founded as a market town in 1218, when it was granted a market charter, however the market had died out long before the 19th century.

The village church of St John the Baptist is one of the oldest buildings in the village, dating from the 13th century; it was built by monks from Kenilworth Abbey, and the first record of a priest here was from 1252. The church was partly rebuilt in the 15th century, but incorporating parts of the earlier church.

The village thrived in part due to the nearby great houses of Coombe Abbey and Newbold Revel, and the trades of candlemaking, basket weaving and silk manufacture all took place in the village.

The Oxford Canal was opened through the village in 1790, and this brought extra prosperity to the village, although it was later straightened out in the 1830s, and the new course bypassed Brinklow to the east, although a stretch of the old route remained open as an arm of the canal serving the village.

Between 1847 and 1957, Brinklow had its own railway station on the Trent Valley Line, located around one mile to the north of the village.

The village formerly had a primary school, but this was closed in 1996.

At one time there were four public houses in the village; The Raven, the White Lion, the Dun Cow and the Bull's Head.

== Governance ==
Brinklow is governed by Brinklow Parish Council, which consists of six councillors. They launched a redeveloped website in 2011.

== Gallery ==
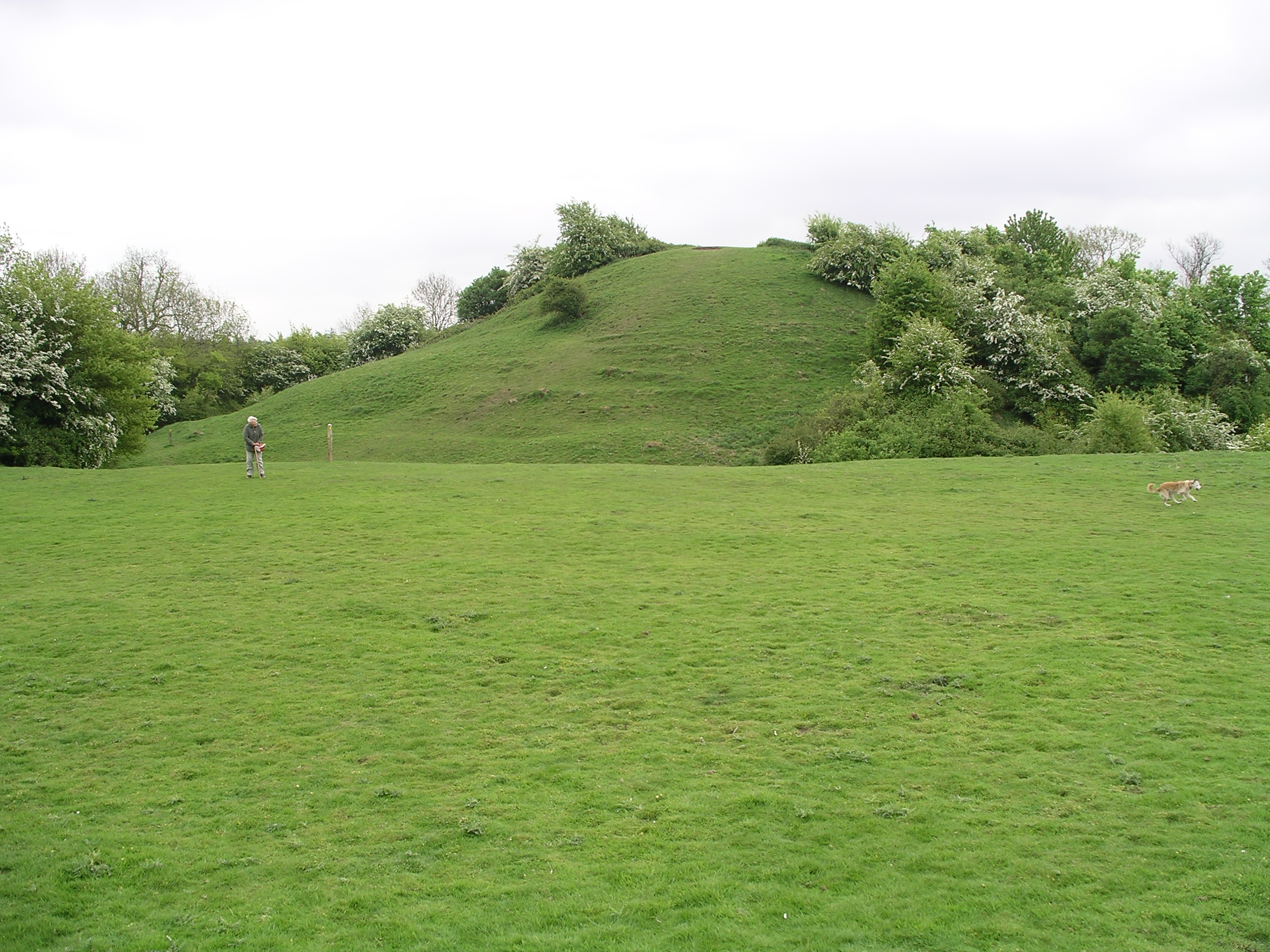
The remains of Brinklow Castle

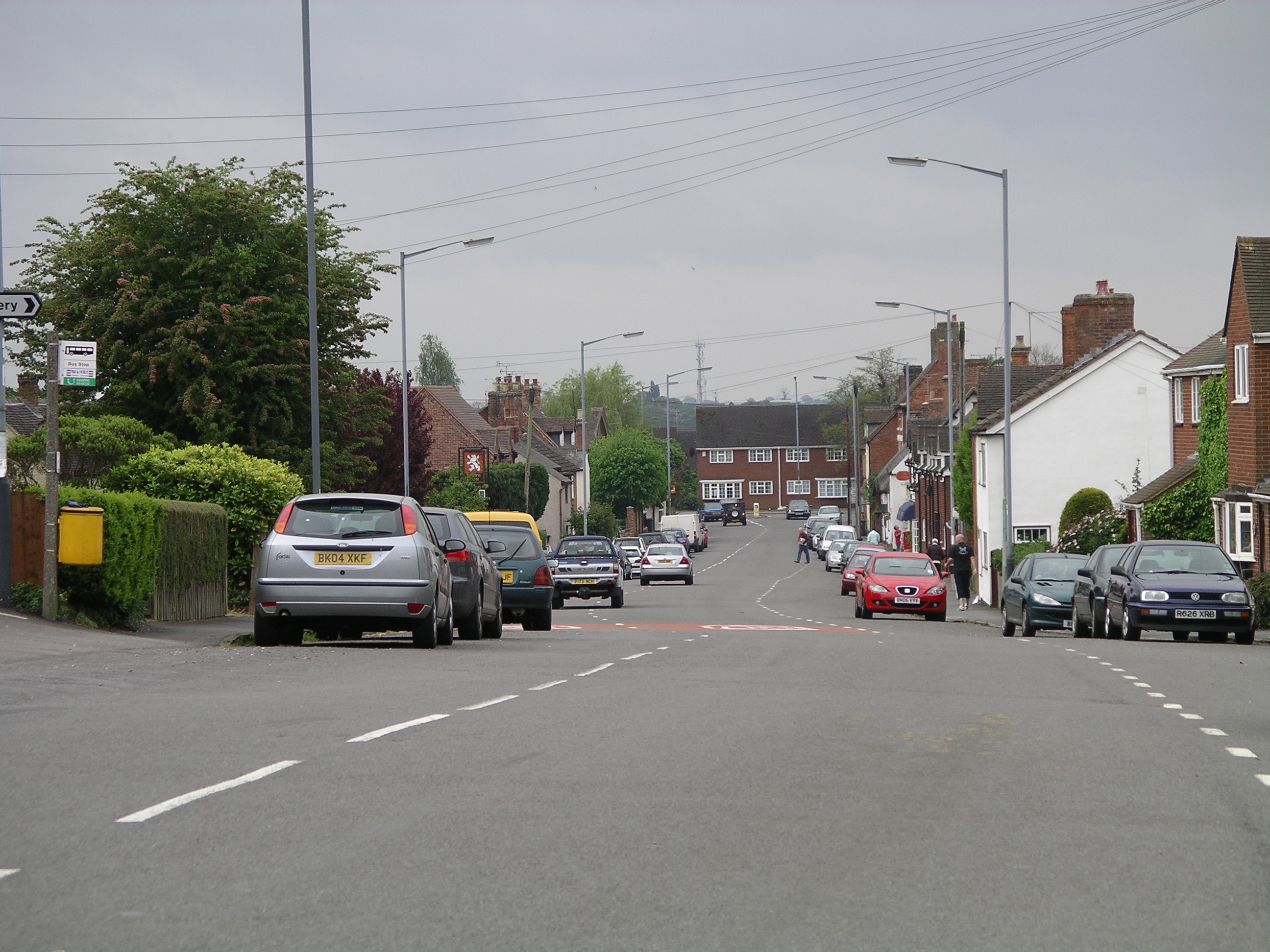
The main road through Brinklow

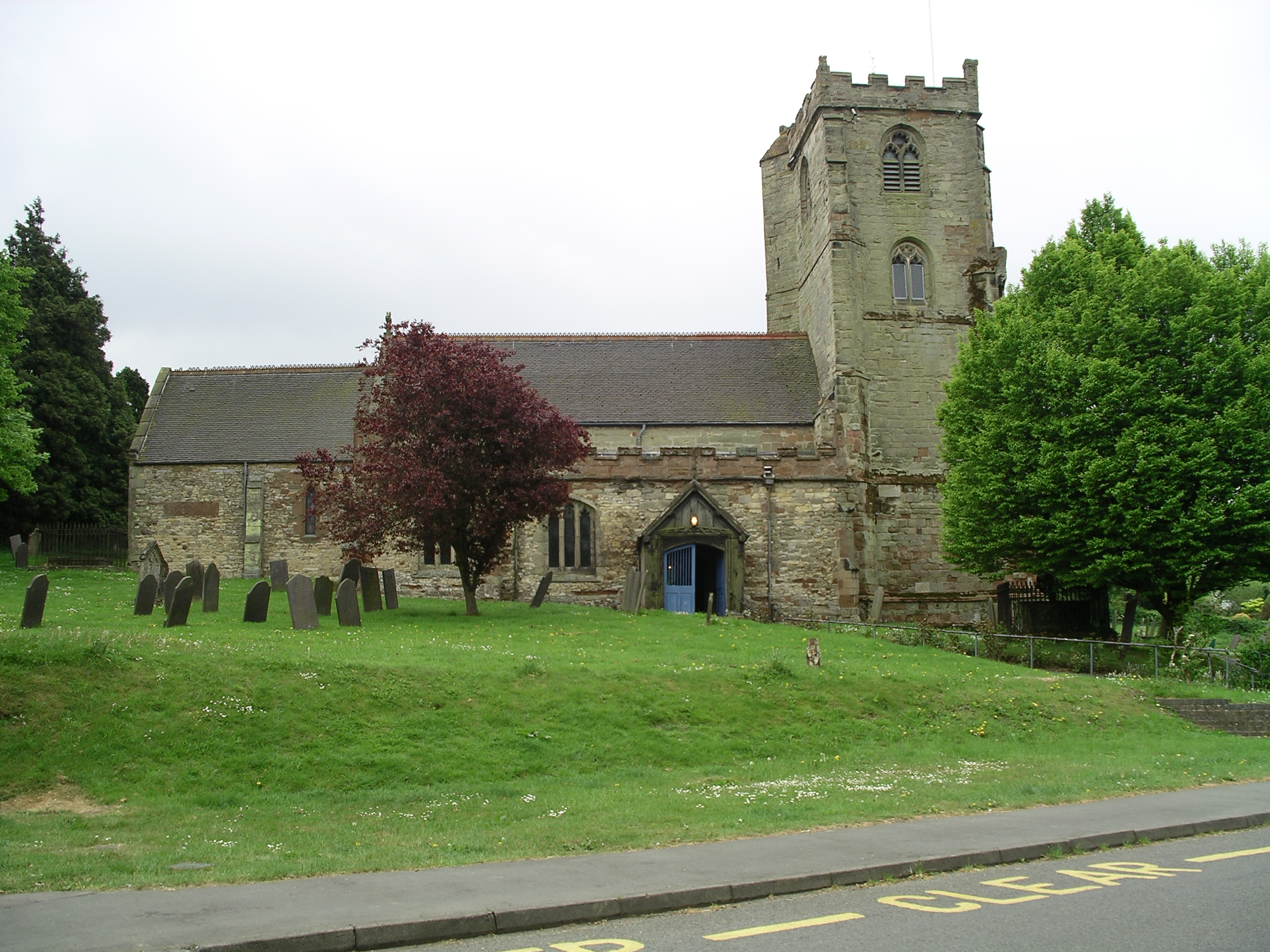
St John's Church in Brinklow
