= On the Brink (painting) =

Painting by Alfred Elmore

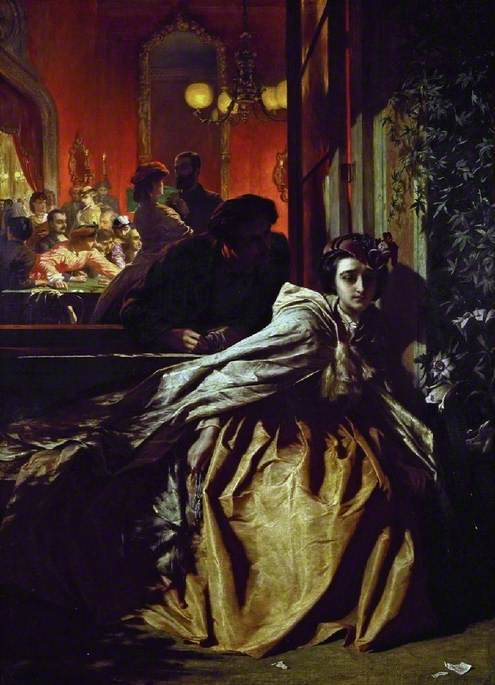
- Artist: Alfred Elmore
- Year: 1864
- Type: Oil on canvas, genre painting
- Dimensions: 113.7 cm × 82.7 cm (44.8 in × 32.6 in)
- Location: Fitzwilliam Museum; Cambridge

On the Brink is an 1864 genre painting by the British artist Alfred Elmore. It features a mid-Victorian era casino where a young woman appears to be considering taking up a form of prostitution to either pay her debts or continue her gambling addiction. The symbolism is enhanced by the torn playing card on the floor.

The painting was displayed at the Royal Academy's Summer Exhibition of 1865 at the National Gallery in London. Today it is in the collection of the Fitzwilliam Museum in Cambridge, having been acquired in 1975.

== Bibliography ==
- Eltis, Sos. Acts of Desire: Women and Sex on Stage 1800-1930. Oxford University Press, 2013.
- Kern, Stephen. Eyes of Love: The Gaze in English and French Paintings and Novels, 1840-1900. Reaction Books, 1996.
