= Disaster Masters =

- Genre: Documentary
- Directed by: Madeleine Hall, Andy Wells
- Presented by: Barbara Windsor 2005
- Starring: Barbara Windsor 2005
- Country of origin: United Kingdom
- No. of series: 2
- No. of episodes: 18

Production
- Running time: 29 minutes (approx)

Original release
- Network: BBC Sky TV
- Release: 27 June 2005 – 2009

Disaster Masters was a series on BBC1 which followed the workers of the British emergency and non-emergency repairs company Homeserve as they carried out repair work contracted by householders' insurance companies. During the different series, they were seen dealing with major disasters such as the Carlisle floods, Birmingham tornado, and the Buncefield oil depot explosion. They were also seen carrying out more minor repairs such as boarding up broken windows.

Disaster Masters ran for a total of two series and eighteen episodes before it was canceled by the BBC. The series was then bought by Sky, who broadcast it at different times throughout the week on Sky Real Lives.
