= List of Yu-Gi-Oh! Arc-V episodes =

Yu-Gi-Oh! Arc-V is the fourth spin-off anime in the Yu-Gi-Oh! franchise and the fifth anime series overall. It is produced by Nihon Ad Systems and broadcast by TV Tokyo. It is directed by Katsumi Ono and produced by Studio Gallop. Its plot focuses on Yuya Sakaki, who is a boy seeking to become the greatest entertainer in Action Duels who brings forth a new summoning method to Duel Monsters known as Pendulum Summoning. Currently, twelve pieces of theme music are used for the series: six openings and six ending themes. From episodes 1–30, the first opening theme is "Believe × Believe" by Bullet Train, while the first ending theme is "One Step" by P-Cute. From episodes 31–49, the second opening theme is "Burn!" by Bullet Train, while the second ending theme is "Future Fighter!" by Kenshō Ono and Yoshimasa Hosoya. From episodes 50–75, the third opening theme is "Hanate" (ハナテ; lit. 'Unleash') by Gekidan Niagara, while the third ending theme is "Arc of Smile!" by Boys And Men. From episodes 76–98, the fourth opening theme is "Kirifuda" (切り札; lit. 'Trump Card') by Japanese rock band Cinema Staff, while the fourth ending theme is "Speaking" by Mrs. GREEN APPLE. From episodes 99–124, the fifth opening theme is "Kibō no Hikari" (キボウノヒカリ; lit. 'Light of Hope') by Unknown Number, while the fifth ending theme is "Vision" (ビジョン, Bijon) by Kusoiinkai. From episodes 125–147, the sixth opening theme is "Pendulum Beat!" by Super★Dragon, while the sixth ending theme is "Dashing Pendulum" by M!lk. For the English dub version, the opening theme is "Can You Feel the Power" for all episodes.

== Series overview ==
Season	Episodes	Originally released	
Season	Episodes	First released	Last released
1	49	April 6, 2014	March 29, 2015
2	50	April 5, 2015	April 3, 2016
3	49	April 3, 2016	March 27, 2017

== Episode list ==
=== Season 1 (2014–15) ===
No.	English dub title / Japanese translated title	Directed by	Written by	Storyboarded by	Original release date	English air date (Note: Section reflects the first-time airing of the English dub in either Canada or Australia.)	American air date (Note: Section reflects the airing of the English dub in the United States.)
1	"Swing Into Action: Part 1" / The Trail of Light, Pendulum Summoning! Transliteration: "Hikari no Kiseki, Pendyuramu Shōkan!" (Japanese: 光の軌跡、ペンデュラム召喚！)	Katsumi Ono Animation director: Hidekazu Ebina	Tsutomu Kamishiro	Katsumi Ono	April 6, 2014	July 24, 2015 (Note: The English dub of Yu-Gi-Oh! Arc-V episodes 1–14 first premiered in Canada on Teletoon.)	February 21, 2016
2	"Swing Into Action: Part 2" / The Strongest Evolution Of Dueling!! Its Name is Action Duel; Transliteration: "Kettō Saikyō Shinka-kei!! Sono Na wa Akushon Dyueru" (Japanese: 決闘最強進化系！！その名はアクションデュエル)	Kimiharu Muto Animation director: Yuya Kawamura	Tsutomu Kamishiro	Katsumi Ono, Masahiro Takada	April 13, 2014	July 31, 2015	February 21, 2016
3	"Trade Bait: Part 1" / Dark Town: The Stolen Pendulum Summon!! Transliteration: "Daakutaun Ubawareta Pendyuramu Shōkan!!" (Japanese: ダークタウン 奪われたペンデュラム召喚！！)	Naoki Kotani Animation director: Momoko Makiuchi	Teru Arai	Kiyoshi Egami	April 20, 2014	August 7, 2015	February 28, 2016
4	"Trade Bait: Part 2" / A Ray of Hope! Block Spider; Transliteration: "Hitosuji no Kibō!! Burokku Supaidaa" (Japanese: 一筋の希望！！ブロックスパイダー)	Kazuomi Koga Animation director: Hikaru Kodama, Ichizou Kobayashi, Rie Ogasawara, Rie Furuya	Teru Arai	Kumiko Habara	April 27, 2014	August 14, 2015	March 6, 2016
5	"Toying Around: Part 1" / Wannabe Apprentice!? A Strange Fanboy, "Sora Shiunin"; Transliteration: "Deshiiri Shigan!? Okashina Okkake "Shiun'in Sora"" (Japanese: 弟子入り志願！？ おかしなおっかけ 『紫雲院素良』)	Shigeki Hatakeyama Animation director: Masayuki Fujita, Shinichi Shigematsu, Kaito Senkouji	Gō Zappa	Yukio Nishimoto	May 11, 2014	August 21, 2015	March 13, 2016
6	"Toying Around: Part 2" / The Innocent Toy: Death-Toy Scissor Bear; Transliteration: "Mujyaki na Omocha Desutooi Shizaa Beaa" (Japanese: 無邪気な融合玩具 デストーイ・シザー・ベアー)	Keiichirou Mochizuki Animation director: Toshi Shishikura	Gō Zappa	Noche Yagi	May 18, 2014	August 28, 2015	March 20, 2016
7	"Mr. Mystery" / Imperial Wrath of Treason - Dark Rebellion Xyz Dragon; Transliteration: "Hangyaku no Gekirin Dāku Riberion Ekushīzu Doragon" (Japanese: 反逆の逆鱗 ダーク・リベリオン・エクシーズ・ドラゴン)	Ryūta Yamamoto Animation director: Toshihiko Masuda	Mitsutaka Hirota	Katsumi Ono	May 25, 2014	September 11, 2015	March 27, 2016
8	"Bad Business" / You Show Duel School's Crisis!! LDS Invasion; Transliteration: "Yūshō Juku no Kiki! ! Erudīesu Shūrai" (Japanese: 遊勝塾の危機！！LDS襲来)	Masahiro Takada Animation director: Hidekazu Ebina	Tsutomu Kamishiro	Masahiro Takada	June 1, 2014	September 18, 2015	April 3, 2016
9	"Dueling with the Stars" / Judgment of the Stars! Xyz User "Hokuto Shijima"; Transliteration: "Hoshiboshi no Sabaki! Ekushīzu Tsukai "Shijima Hokuto"" (Japanese: 星々の裁き！エクシーズ使い「志島北斗」)	Matsuo Asami Animation director: Shinichirou Minami	Mitsutaka Hirota	Tsukasa Sunaga	June 8, 2014	September 25, 2015	April 10, 2016
10	"You Show Em" / Knight of the Secret Stone! Fusion User "Masumi Kotsu"; Transliteration: "Hiseki no Kishi! Yūgō Tsukai "Kōtsu Masumi"" (Japanese: 秘石の騎士！融合使い「光津真澄」)	Kumiko Habara Animation director: Momoko Makiuchi	Gō Zappa	Kumiko Habara	June 15, 2014	October 2, 2015	April 17, 2016
11	""Going, Going, Gong"" / At One With The Sword! Synchro User "Yaiba Todo"; Transliteration: "Shinken Ittai! Shinkuro Tsukai "Tōdō Yaiba"" (Japanese: 身剣一体！シンクロ使い「刀堂刃」)	Naoki Kotani Animation director: Shinji Seya	Gō Zappa	Yukio Nishimoto	June 22, 2014	October 9, 2015	April 24, 2016
12	"Battle Under the Big Top" / DDD: King of the Different Dimension; Transliteration: "Dīdīdī Ijigen no Ō" (Japanese: DDD 異次元の王)	Shigeki Hatakeyama Animation director: Masayuki Fujita, Shinichi Shigematsu, Kaito Senkouji, Michio Satou	Tsutomu Kamishiro	Tsukasa Sunaga	June 29, 2014	October 16, 2015	May 1, 2016
13	"Circus Surprise!" / Magical Sages Galilei & Kepler; Transliteration: "Madō Kenja Garirei & Kepurā" (Japanese: 魔導賢者ガリレイ、ケプラー)	Kimiharu Muto Animation director: Yuya Kawamura	Tsutomu Kamishiro	Kazuomi Koga	July 6, 2014	October 23, 2015	May 8, 2016
14	"The Show Must Go On" / Hotblooded!! Shuzo Theater; Transliteration: "Nekketsu!! Shūzō Gekijō" (Japanese: 熱血！！修造劇場)	Ryūta Yamamoto Animation director: Akiko Toyoda	Tsutomu Kamishiro	Shunsuke Machitani	July 13, 2014	October 30, 2015	May 15, 2016
15	"In It to Win It" / Aim For The Junior Youth Championship!! Transliteration: "Mezase Junia Yūsu Senshuken!!" (Japanese: 目指せジュニアユース選手権！！)	Keiichirou Mochizuki Animation director: Toshi Shishikura	Tsutomu Kamishiro	Katsumi Ono	July 20, 2014	November 1, 2015 (Note: The English dub of Yu-Gi-Oh! Arc-V episodes 15–49 first premiered in Australia on 9Go!.)	October 2, 2016
16	"Menu Venue: Part 1" / Genius Master Chef "Michio Mokota"; Transliteration: "Tensai Ryōrijin "Mokota Michio"" (Japanese: 天才料理人"茂古田未知夫")	Masahiro Takada Animation director: Hidekazu Ebina	Gō Zappa	Masahiro Takada	July 27, 2014	November 6, 2015	October 2, 2016
17	"Menu Venue: Part 2" / An Exciting Performance!! A Fulfilling Meal! Transliteration: "Gōkai Hirō!! Manpuku Zenseki!" (Japanese: 豪快披露！！ 満腹全席！)	Naoki Kotani Animation director: Toshihiko Masuda	Gō Zappa	Tsukasa Sunaga	August 3, 2014	November 8, 2015	October 9, 2016
18	"Trapped in a Card" / The Two Shadows of Rebellion; Transliteration: "Hangyaku no Futatsu no Kage" (Japanese: 反逆の2つの影)	Akira Shigino Animation director: Noh Gil-bo, Yuuki Iwai	Tsutomu Kamishiro	Tetsuaki Matsuda	August 10, 2014	November 8, 2015	October 9, 2016
19	"Quiz Quagmire: Part 1" / The Universe of Knowledge!! Eita Kyuando; Transliteration: "Chishiki no Uchū!! Kyūandō Eita" (Japanese: 知識の宇宙!! 九庵堂栄太)	Yoshitaka Fujimoto, Ryūta Yamamoto Animation director: Shuujirou Ami, Shinichirou Minami	Mitsutaka Hirota	Kenji Setou	August 17, 2014	November 14, 2015	October 16, 2016
20	"Quiz Quagmire: Part 2" / A Difficult Problem!? Attack Duel Quiz!! Transliteration: "Nanmon!? Atakku Dueru Kuizu!!" (Japanese: 難問!? アタックデュエルクイズ!!)	Shigeki Hatakeyama Animation director: Masayuki Fujita, Akihiko Oka, Shintarou Tsubota, Michio Satou	Mitsutaka Hirota	Tsukasa Sunaga	August 24, 2014	November 15, 2015	October 16, 2016
21	"Beyond Belief" / Beyond the Pendulum; Transliteration: "Pendyuramu no Sono Saki ni" (Japanese: ペンデュラムのその先に)	Tetsuaki Matsuda Animation director: Noh Gil-bo	Tsutomu Kamishiro	Katsumi Ono	August 31, 2014	November 15, 2015	October 23, 2016
22	"A Date With Fate: Part 1" / The Fortunetelling Girl - Mieru Hōchun; Transliteration: "Uranai Shōjo Hochun Mieru" (Japanese: 占い少女 方中ミエル)	Kimiharu Muto Animation director: Yuya Kawamura	Gō Zappa	Shunsuke Machitani	September 7, 2014	November 21, 2015	October 23, 2016
23	"A Date With Fate: Part 2" / Arcane Eyes; Transliteration: "Hijutsu no Manako" (Japanese: 秘術の眼)	Keiichirou Mochizuki Animation director: Toshi Shishikura	Gō Zappa	Kenji Setou	September 14, 2014	November 22, 2015	November 6, 2016
24	"For Our Tomorrows" / The Wings of Rebellion - Raid Raptors; Transliteration: "Hangyaku no Tsubasa - Reido Raputāzu" (Japanese: 反逆の翼 レイド・ラプターズ)	Masahiro Takada Animation director: Hidekazu Ebina	Tsutomu Kamishiro	Masahiro Takada	September 21, 2014	November 22, 2015	November 6, 2016
25	"Battle Between Buddies: Part 1" / Steadfast Resolve!! Noboru Gongenzaka; Transliteration: "Fudō no Kakugo!! Gongenzaka Noboru" (Japanese: 不動の覚悟！！権現坂昇)	Ryūta Yamamoto Animation director: Akiko Toyoda	Tsutomu Kamishiro	Yukio Nishimoto	September 28, 2014	November 28, 2015	November 13, 2016
26	"Battle Between Buddies: Part 2" / A New Boundary - Superheavy Koujin Susano-O; Transliteration: "Aratana Chihei Chō'omo Kōjin Susanō" (Japanese: 新たな地平超重荒神 スサノ―O)	Akira Shigino Animation director: Momoko Makiuchi, Michio Satou, Hiroaki Kawaguchi	Tsutomu Kamishiro	Shin Katagai	October 5, 2014	November 29, 2015	November 13, 2016
27	"Challengers Assemble" / Opening!! The Maiami Championship; Transliteration: "Kaimaku!! Maiami Chanpionshippu" (Japanese: 開幕！！舞網チャンピオンシップ)	Fumio Maezono Animation director: Toshihiko Masuda	Mitsutaka Hirota	Shunsuke Machitani	October 12, 2014	November 29, 2015	November 20, 2016
28	"Something's Fishy" / Ayu's Entertainment Aquarium; Transliteration: "Ayu no Entame Suizokukan" (Japanese: アユのエンタメ水族館)	Shigeki Hatakeyama Animation director: Kazuyuki Ikai, Michio Satou	Gō Zappa	Naoki Kotani	October 19, 2014	December 5, 2015	November 27, 2016
29	"Fusion Foes" / Fusing Melodious Divas! Transliteration: "Yūgōsuru Otohime!" (Japanese: 融合する音姫!)	Naoki Kotani Animation director: Shuujirou Ami, Shinichirou Minami	Gō Zappa	Katsumi Ono	October 26, 2014	December 6, 2015	December 4, 2016
30	"Gong the Strong" / The Tested Resolution of Steadfast Heart; Transliteration: "Tamesareru Fudō no Kokoro" (Japanese: 試される不動の心)	Tetsuaki Matsuda Animation director: Noh Gil-bo	Tsutomu Kamishiro	Kenji Setou	November 2, 2014	December 6, 2015	December 11, 2016
31	"The Pendulum Swings Both Ways: Part 1" / The Howling Whirlwind - Yōsen Lost Tornado! Transliteration: "Unaru Senpū Yōsen Rosuto Torunēdo!" (Japanese: 唸る旋風 妖仙ロスト・トルネード！)	Keiichirou Mochizuki Animation director: Toshi Shishikura	Mitsutaka Hirota	Masayoshi Nishida	November 9, 2014	December 13, 2015	December 18, 2016
32	"The Pendulum Swings Both Ways: Part 2" / White-Hot Battle! Entertainment Duel Show; Transliteration: "Nessen! Entame Dueru Shō" (Japanese: 熱戦！エンタメデュエルショー)	Kimiharu Muto Animation director: Yuya Kawamura	Mitsutaka Hirota	Shunsuke Machitani	November 16, 2014	December 13, 2015	January 1, 2017
33	"Making the Cut: Part 1" / Future Metropolis Heartland; Transliteration: "Mirai Toshi Hātorando" (Japanese: 未来都市ハートランド)	Ryūta Yamamoto Animation director: Akiko Toyoda	Tsutomu Kamishiro	Tsukasa Sunaga	November 23, 2014	December 13, 2015	January 8, 2017
34	"Making the Cut: Part 2" / The Combining Demonic-Beast VS The Evolving Falcon; Transliteration: "Ketsugō Majū Bāsasu Shinka-suru Hayabusa" (Japanese: 結けつ合ごう魔ま獣じゅうVS進しん化かする隼はやぶさ)	Masahiro Takada Animation director: Hidekazu Ebina	Tsutomu Kamishiro	Masahiro Takada	November 30, 2014	December 20, 2015	January 22, 2017
35	"Sora's Secrets: Part 1" / The Academia and The Resistance; Transliteration: "Akademia to Rejisutansu" (Japanese: アカデミアとレジスタンス)	Fujiaki Asari, Tadao Ookubo Animation director: Yuji Kokai, Michio Satou, Mio Usui	Tsutomu Kamishiro	Yūzō Satō	December 14, 2014	December 20, 2015	January 29, 2017
36	"Sora's Secrets: Part 2" / The Resonating Dragons; Transliteration: "Kyōmei Suru Ryū" (Japanese: 共鳴する竜)	Shigeki Hatakeyama Animation director: Michio Satou, Kazuyuki Ikai, Takao Inomae	Tsutomu Kamishiro	Kenji Setou	December 21, 2014	December 20, 2015	January 29, 2017
37	"A Dark Reflection" / The Destiny that Starts Moving; Transliteration: "Ugokidasu Unmei" (Japanese: 動き出す運命)	Fumio Maezono Animation director: Toshihiko Masuda	Tsutomu Kamishiro	Katsumi Ono	December 28, 2014	December 27, 2015	October 1, 2017
38	"Warped Dimensions" / The Four Dimensions; Transliteration: "Yotsu no Jigen" (Japanese: 4つの次元)	Tetsuaki Matsuda Animation director: Noh Gil-bo	Tsutomu Kamishiro	Kazuya Iwata	January 11, 2015	December 27, 2015	October 8, 2017
39	"A Duel Personality" / Awakening of the Imperial Wrath; Transliteration: "Gekirin no Kakusei" (Japanese: 逆鱗の覚醒)	Keiichirou Mochizuki Animation director: Toshi Shishikura	Ryo Tamura	Kenichi Takeshita	January 18, 2015	December 27, 2015	October 15, 2017
40	"Stealth Warriors" / The Warrior of Academia; Transliteration: "Akademia no Senshi" (Japanese: はアカデミアの戦士)	Naoki Kotani Animation director: Lee Sung-jin	Ryo Tamura	Naoki Kotani	January 25, 2015	January 3, 2016	October 22, 2017
41	"Bracing for Battle" / The Land of Ambition - Duel Academia; Transliteration: "Yabō no Ji - Dyueru Akademia" (Japanese: 野望の地ち デュエルアカデミア)	Kimiharu Muto Animation director: Yuya Kawamura	Tsutomu Kamishiro	Tsukasa Sunaga	February 1, 2015	January 3, 2016	October 29, 2017
42	"Battle Fields" / Battle Royal Begins; Transliteration: "Batoru Roiyaru Shidō" (Japanese: バトルロイヤル始動)	Shinya Une Animation director: Kiyotaka Iida	Ryo Tamura	Kenji Setou	February 8, 2015	January 4, 2016	November 5, 2017
43	"Fire and Ice" / The Marvelous Exchange Student "Dennis"; Transliteration: "Kareinaru Ryūgakusei "Denisu"" (Japanese: 華麗なる留学生 「デニス」)	Kumiko Habara Animation director: Momoko Makiuchi	Ryo Tamura	Shunsuke Machitani	February 15, 2015	January 10, 2016	November 12, 2017
44	"Danger Zones" / Sora Shiun'in, Storms Forth!! Transliteration: "Shiun'in Sora, Shūrai!!" (Japanese: 紫雲院素良、襲来！！)	Ryūta Yamamoto Animation director: Michio Satou, Kazuyuki Ikai	Ryo Tamura	Kazuya Iwata	February 22, 2015	January 11, 2016	November 19, 2017
45	"Obelisk Assault" / Antithesis and Synthesis; Transliteration: "Sōkoku to Sōjō" (Japanese: 相克と相生)	Masahiro Takada Animation director: Hidekazu Ebina	Ryo Tamura	Masahiro Takada	March 1, 2015	January 11, 2016	November 26, 2017
46	"Dragon's Vengeance" / The Rebellious Supreme King Black Dragon; Transliteration: "Hangyaku no Haō Kokuryū" (Japanese: 反逆の覇王黒龍)	Keiichirou Mochizuki Animation director: Toshi Shishikura	Tsutomu Kamishiro	Naoki Kotani	March 8, 2015	January 17, 2016	December 3, 2017
47	"Identity Crisis" / Yuri of The Cold Smile; Transliteration: "Tsumetai Emi no Yūri" (Japanese: 冷たい笑みのユーリ)	Fumio Maezono Animation director: Toshihiko Masuda	Tsutomu Kamishiro	Shunsuke Machitani	March 15, 2015	January 24, 2016	December 10, 2017
48	"Battlefronts" / The Wounded Falcon; Transliteration: "Teoi no Hayabusa" (Japanese: 手負いの隼)	Yasuyuki Fuse Animation director: Lee Sung-jin	Ryo Tamura	Kazuya Iwata	March 22, 2015	January 18, 2016	December 17, 2017
49	"Fighting for Fun" / Duels with Smiles; Transliteration: "Dyueru de Egao o" (Japanese: デュエルで笑顔を)	Kimiharu Muto Animation director: Yuya Kawamura	Ryo Tamura	Katsumi Ono	March 29, 2015	January 24, 2016	December 24, 2017

=== Season 2 (2015–16) ===
No. overall	No. in season	English dub title / Japanese translated title	Directed by	Written by	Storyboarded by	Original release date	English air date
50	1	"Dueling Declan" / Lancers, The Chosen Warriors; Transliteration: "Ransāzu Erabareta Senshi" (Japanese: ランサーズ選ばれた戦士)	Kumiko Habara Animation director: Momoko Makiuchi	Tsutomu Kamishiro	Yukio Nishimoto	April 5, 2015	July 22, 2016 (Note: The English dub of Yu-Gi-Oh! Arc-V episodes 50–61 first premiered in Canada on Teletoon.)
51	2	"Kings vs. Dragons" / Raise the Banner of Revolution - Odd-Eyes Rebellion Dragon; Transliteration: "Hanki o Agero, Oddo-Aizu Riberion Doragon" (Japanese: 反旗を揚げろ オッドアイズ・リベリオン・ドラゴン)	Shinya Une Animation director: Shinpei Koikawa, Kiyotaka Iida	Tsutomu Kamishiro	Kenji Setou	April 12, 2015	July 29, 2016
52	3	"Parental Guidance: Part 1" / The Legendary Grandmaster Revives!! Transliteration: "Yomigaeru Densetsu Sōchō!!" (Japanese: 蘇る伝説総長！！)	Ryūta Yamamoto Animation director: Michio Satou, Kazuyuki Ikai	Tsutomu Kamishiro	Tsukasa Sunaga	April 19, 2015	August 5, 2016
53	4	"Parental Guidance: Part 2" / "Smile World" - A Duel Filled With Smiles; Transliteration: "Egao no Dyueru "Sumairu Wārudo"" (Japanese: 笑顔のデュエル 「スマイル・ワールド」)	Keiichirou Mochizuki Animation director: Toshi Shishikura	Tsutomu Kamishiro	Tsukasa Sunaga	April 26, 2015	August 12, 2016
54	5	"City 'Scape" / The Synchro Dimension "Neo Domino City"; Transliteration: "Shinkuro Jigen "Neo Domino Shiti"" (Japanese: シンクロ次元 「ネオ童実野シティ」)	Masahiro Takada Animation director: Hidekazu Ebina	Tsutomu Kamishiro	Masahiro Takada	May 3, 2015	August 19, 2016
55	6	"Tops Speed" / Public Safety Coercion - The Duel Chasers; Transliteration: "Chian no Kyōsei Dyueru Cheisāzu" (Japanese: 治安の強制 デュエルチェイサーズ)	Lee Kap-min Animation director: Lee Sung-jin	Mitsutaka Hirota	Tetsuaki Matsuda	May 10, 2015	August 26, 2016
56	7	"Synchro Sector" / Security's Perfect Encirclement!! Transliteration: "Sekyuriti Kanzen Hōimō!!" (Japanese: セキュリティ完全包囲網！！)	Fumio Maezono Animation director: Toshihiko Masuda	Yasunori Kasuga	Tsukasa Sunaga	May 17, 2015	September 2, 2016
57	8	"Super Duelists" / "The Black Whirlwind - Crow Hogan"; Transliteration: "Kuroi Senpū Kurou Hōgan" (Japanese: 黒い旋風 クロウ・ホーガン)	Kimiharu Muto Animation director: Yuya Kawamura	Ryo Tamura	Naoki Kotani	May 24, 2015	September 9, 2016
58	9	"Scream for the Green" / Invitation to the Dark Duel; Transliteration: "Yami Dyueru e no Shōtai" (Japanese: 闇デュエルへの招待)	Norihiko Nagahama Animation director: Eri Osada, Kim Bu-Yeong	Tsutomu Kamishiro	Norihiko Nagahama	May 31, 2015	September 16, 2016
59	10	"Dueling's Most Wanted" / Underground Riding Duel!! Transliteration: "Chika Raidingu Dyueru!!" (Japanese: 地下ライディング・デュエル！！)	Yasuyuki Fuse Animation director: Choe Byeong-hui, Lee Sung-jin	Mitsutaka Hirota	Tsukasa Sunaga	June 7, 2015	September 23, 2016
60	11	"Showdown in the Slammer" / No Cards, No Pardon; Transliteration: "Jigoku no Sata mo Kādo Shidai" (Japanese: 地獄の沙汰もカード次第)	Keiichirou Mochizuki Animation director: Toshi Shishikura	Mitsutaka Hirota	Shunsuke Machitani	June 14, 2015	September 30, 2016
61	12	"Hero's Fall" / The Man Who Threw Away Drawing; Transliteration: "Dorō o Suteta Otoko" (Japanese: ドローを捨てた男)	Takanori Yano Animation director: Kazuyuki Ikai, Naoki Aisaka, Satoru Shiraishi	Mitsutaka Hirota	Tsukasa Sunaga	June 21, 2015	October 7, 2016
62	13	"The Great Escape" / Great Entertainment Duel Tournament!! Transliteration: "Dai Entamedyueru Taikai!!" (Japanese: 大エンタメデュエル大会!!)	Masahiro Takada Animation director: Hidekazu Ebina	Ryo Tamura	Masahiro Takada	June 28, 2015	October 12, 2016 (Note: The English dub of Yu-Gi-Oh! Arc-V episodes 62–99 first premiered in Australia on 9Go!.)
63	14	"Fight for Freedom" / King of Captors - Goyo King; Transliteration: "Hokaku-sha no Ō Goyō Kingu" (Japanese: 捕獲者の王「ゴョ ウ・キング」)	Yoshitaka Koyama Animation director: Toshihiko Masuda	Tsutomu Kamishiro	Naoki Kotani	July 5, 2015	October 13, 2016
64	15	"Match with the Master" / Duel King - Jack Atlas; Transliteration: "Dyueru Kingu "Jakku Atorasu"" (Japanese: デュエルキング「ジャック·アトラス」)	Kang-Min Lee Animation director: Lee Sung-jin, Choe Byeong-hui	Tsutomu Kamishiro	Tsukasa Sunaga	July 12, 2015	October 14, 2016
65	16	"Traits of a Traitor" / The Shattered Entertainment; Transliteration: "Uchikudakareta Entame" (Japanese: 打ち砕かれたエンタメ)	Kimiharu Muto Animation director: Yuya Kawamura	Tsutomu Kamishiro	Kazuya Iwata	July 19, 2015	October 17, 2016
66	17	"Crow's Crew" / Opening Duel!! Crow vs. Gongenzaka; Transliteration: "Kaimakusen!! Kurou Bāsasu Gongenzaka" (Japanese: 開幕戦！！クロウVS権現坂)	Yukio Takahashi Animation director: Eri Osada, Takashi Ueno	Yoshifumi Fukushima	Yukio Takahashi	July 26, 2015	October 18, 2016
67	18	"Riley's Reveal" / The Light and Shadows of Neo Domino City; Transliteration: "Neo Domino Shiti no Hikari to Kage" (Japanese: ネオ童実野シティの光と影)	Naoki Kotani Animation director: Ikkou Kobayashi, Chûichi Iguchi	Tsutomu Kamishiro	Naoki Kotani	August 2, 2015	October 19, 2016
68	19	"Common Cause" / All-Out Rebellion- Bee Force; Transliteration: "Bī Fōsu Issei Hōki" (Japanese: B・F(ビー・フォース)一斉蜂起)	Keiichirou Mochizuki Animation director: Toshi Shishikura	Ryo Tamura	Tsukasa Sunaga	August 9, 2015	October 20, 2016
69	20	"A Concerted Effort" / The Sprinting Divas; Transliteration: "Shissō-suru Dība" (Japanese: 疾走するディーバ)	Yasuyuki Fuse Animation director: Choe Byeong-hui, Lee Sung-jin	Mitsutaka Hirota	Tetsuaki Matsuda	August 16, 2015	October 21, 2016
70	21	"The Gift of Grit" / An Out-Of-Reach Shout; Transliteration: "Todokanu Sakebi" (Japanese: 届かぬ叫び)	Ippei Yokota Animation director: Tomoaki Kado, Eri Kojima	Tsutomu Kamishiro	Tsukasa Sunaga	August 23, 2015	October 24, 2016
71	22	"Duel Consequences" / The Sword of White Silver; Transliteration: "Shirogane no Tsurugi" (Japanese: 白銀の剣)	Naoki Murata Animation director: Kazuyuki Ikai, Satoru Shiraishi	Mitsutaka Hirota	Shōji Nishida	August 30, 2015	October 25, 2016
72	23	"Turbotainers" / Slaying the Dragon!! Yugo vs Sawatari; Transliteration: "Doragon Seibatsu!! Yūgo Bāsasu Sawatari" (Japanese: ドラゴン征伐！！ ユーゴvs沢渡)	Ryūta Yamamoto Animation director: Hidekazu Ebina	Yoshifumi Fukushima	Tsukasa Sunaga	September 6, 2015	October 26, 2016
73	24	"Turning Point" / The Crawling Losers; Transliteration: "Chi o Hau Haibokusha-tachi" (Japanese: 地を這う敗北者たち)	Yoshitaka Koyama Animation director: Toshihiko Masuda	Tsutomu Kamishiro	Ryūta Yamamoto	September 13, 2015	October 27, 2016
74	25	"A Traitor Unmasked" / Mask Of The Clown; Transliteration: "Dōkeshi no Kamen" (Japanese: 道化師の仮面)	Kang-Min Lee Animation director: Lee Sung-jin, Lee Seok-yoon	Ryo Tamura	Tsukasa Sunaga	September 20, 2015	October 28, 2016
75	26	"Shay's Revenge" / Curse of the Resistors; Transliteration: "Hangyakusha no Jubaku" (Japanese: 反逆者の呪縛)	Kimiharu Muto Animation director: Yuya Kawamura	Ryo Tamura	Tsukasa Sunaga	September 27, 2015	October 31, 2016
76	27	"Plans of Attack" / King's Gambit; Transliteration: "Kinguzu Gyanbitto" (Japanese: キングズ・ギャンビット)	Naoki Kotani Animation director: Chûichi Iguchi	Tsutomu Kamishiro	Naoki Kotani	October 4, 2015	November 1, 2016
77	28	"A Cons Game" / The Beauty of Destruction; Transliteration: "Hakai no Bigaku" (Japanese: 破壊の美学)	Keiichirou Mochizuki Animation director: Toshi Shishikura	Mitsutaka Hirota	Masahiro Takada	October 11, 2015	November 2, 2016
78	29	"Rebel Road" / Storm of Revolution; Transliteration: "Kakumei no Arashi" (Japanese: 革命の嵐)	Ippei Yokota Animation director: Tomoaki Kado, Eri Kojima, Kazuki Baba	Yoshifumi Fukushima	Shōji Nishida	October 18, 2015	November 3, 2016
79	30	"Road to Rebellion" / The Enlightened Paladin; Transliteration: "Kakusei-suru Madō Kenshi" (Japanese: 覚醒する魔導剣士)	Yasuyuki Fuse Animation director: Lee Sung-jin, Lee Seok-yun	Yoshifumi Fukushima	Naoki Kotani	October 25, 2015	November 4, 2016
80	31	"Where the Truth Lies" / Reunion that Transcends Dimensions; Transliteration: "Jigen o Koeta Saikai" (Japanese: 次元を越えた再会)	Jìng xuě yuèyè Animation director: Teruhiko Yamazaki, Hwang Youngsik	Tsutomu Kamishiro	Masahiro Takada	November 1, 2015	November 7, 2016
81	32	"Battle Birds" / Our Respective Battlefields; Transliteration: "Sorezore no Senjō" (Japanese: それぞれの戦場)	Ryūta Yamamoto Animation director: Hidekazu Ebina	Ryo Tamura	Ryūta Yamamoto	November 8, 2015	November 8, 2016
82	33	"Warriors of the Air" / The Ultimate Falcon VS The Black-Feathered Thunder; Transliteration: "Kyūkyoku no Hayabusa Bāsasu Kurohane no Ikazuchi" (Japanese: 究極の隼VS黒羽の雷)	Yoshitaka Koyama Animation director: Toshihiko Masuda	Ryo Tamura	Shōji Nishida	November 15, 2015	November 9, 2016
83	34	"A Matter of Trust" / The Bond Between Teacher and Disciple; Transliteration: "Shitei no Kizuna" (Japanese: 師弟の絆)	Junichi Takahashi Animation director: Satoru Shiraishi, Kazuyuki Ikai	Tsutomu Kamishiro	Naoki Kotani	November 22, 2015	November 10, 2016
84	35	"A Plan and a Promise: Part 1" / Dice Roll of Destiny; Transliteration: "Unmei no Daisurōru" (Japanese: 運命のダイスロール)	Kang-Min Lee Animation director: Lee Sung-jin, Lee Seok-yoon	Mitsutaka Hirota	Masahiro Takada	November 29, 2015	November 11, 2016
85	36	"A Plan and a Promise: Part 2" / Crystal Wings; Transliteration: "Suishō no Tsubasa" (Japanese: 水晶の翼)	Keiichirou Mochizuki Animation director: Toshi Shishikura	Mitsutaka Hirota	Tsukasa Sunaga	December 13, 2015	November 14, 2016
86	37	"Against All Odds" / Unyielding Resolve; Transliteration: "Hirumanu Ketsui" (Japanese: 怯まぬ決意)	Masahiro Takada Animation director: Yuya Kawamura	Tsutomu Kamishiro	Katsumi Ono	December 20, 2015	November 15, 2016
87	38	"The Many Dimensions Of Yuya" / The Memories of the Beast; Transliteration: "Yajū no Kioku" (Japanese: 野獣の記憶)	Ippei Yokota Animation director: Tomoaki Kado, Eri Kojima, Kazuki Baba	Tsutomu Kamishiro	Shōji Nishida	December 27, 2015	November 16, 2016
88	39	"Wake Up Call" / One Strike of Lightning! Transliteration: "Raimei no Ichigeki!" (Japanese: 雷鳴の一撃!)	Yoshihide Yuuzumi Animation director: Mizuki Satou, Teruhiko Yamazaki, Hwang Young-Sik	Tsutomu Kamishiro	Naoki Kotani	January 10, 2016	November 17, 2016
89	40	"Hunted And Hounded" / Invasion! Obelisk Force; Transliteration: "Kyōshū! Oberisuku Fōsu" (Japanese: 強襲！オベリスクフォース)	Ryūta Yamamoto Animation director: Hidekazu Ebina, Kenichi Hara	Mitsutaka Hirota	Ryūta Yamamoto	January 17, 2016	November 18, 2016
90	41	"Down With the Underground" / The Beacon of Revolution; Transliteration: "Kakumei no Noroshi" (Japanese: 革命の狼煙)	Yasuyuki Fuse Animation director: Lee Sung-jin, Lee Seok-yun	Ryo Tamura	Masahiro Takada	January 24, 2016	November 21, 2016
91	42	"Chain Game" / Converging Fates; Transliteration: "Meguriau Unmei" (Japanese: めぐりあう運命)	Yoshitaka Koyama Animation director: Toshihiko Masuda	Tsutomu Kamishiro	Yasuyuki Fuse	January 31, 2016	November 22, 2016
92	43	"Tragic Reunion"; Transliteration: "Hiun no Saikai" (Japanese: 悲運の再会)	Junichi Takahashi Animation director: Satoru Shiraishi, Kazuyuki Ikai	Tsutomu Kamishiro	Tsukasa Sunaga	February 7, 2016	November 23, 2016
93	44	"Road Rage: Part 1" / The Destructive Duel Machine; Transliteration: "Hametsu no Dyueru Mashin" (Japanese: 破滅のデュエルマシン)	Keiichirou Mochizuki Animation director: Toshi Shishikura	Mitsutaka Hirota	Shōji Nishida	February 14, 2016	November 24, 2016
94	45	"Road Rage: Part 2" / The Right Arm that Carved Souls; Transliteration: "Tamashii o Kizanda Migiude" (Japanese: 魂を刻んだ右腕)	Kimiharu Muto Animation director: Yuya Kawamura	Mitsutaka Hirota	Katsumi Ono	February 21, 2016	November 25, 2016
95	46	"Martial Law" / The Duel You Believe In; Transliteration: "Onore no Shinjiru Dyueru" (Japanese: 己の信じるデュエル)	Kang-Min Lee Animation director: Lee Sung-jin, Lee Seok-yoon	Tsutomu Kamishiro	Naoki Kotani	February 28, 2016	November 28, 2016
96	47	"The Imitation" / Borrowed Words; Transliteration: "Karimono no Kotoba" (Japanese: 借り物の言葉)	Ippei Yokota Animation director: Tomoaki Kado, Kazuki Baba	Tsutomu Kamishiro	Masahiro Takada	March 13, 2016	November 29, 2016
97	48	"Making it Mine" / The Sublime Super Paladin; Transliteration: "Kedakaki Chō Madō Kenshi" (Japanese: 気高き超魔導剣士)	Yoshihide Yuuzumi Animation director: Teruhiko Yamazaki, Mizuki Satou	Tsutomu Kamishiro	Ryūta Yamamoto	March 20, 2016	November 30, 2016
98	49	"Friendship Finale" / Towards the Only Path; Transliteration: "Hitotsu no Michi e" (Japanese: ひとつの道へ)	Naoki Kotani Animation director: Hidekazu Ebina, Kenichi Hara	Tsutomu Kamishiro	Katsumi Ono	March 27, 2016	December 1, 2016
99	50	"A Vicious Cycle" / The Eternal Duel; Transliteration: "Eien no Dyueru" (Japanese: 永遠のデュエル)	Yoshitaka Koyama Animation director: Wakana Yamashina, Maiko Abe	Tsutomu Kamishiro	Masahiro Takada	April 3, 2016 (Note: Episodes 99 and 100 aired together as a 1-hour television special.)	December 2, 2016

=== Season 3 (2016–17) ===
No. overall	No. in season	English dub title / Japanese translated title	Directed by	Written by	Storyboarded by	Original release date	English air date	American air date
100	1	"A Warlike Welcome" / The Metropolis of Despair, Heartland; Transliteration: "Zetsubō no Miyako Hātorando" (Japanese: 絶望の都ハートランド)	Yasuyuki Fuse Animation director: Lee Sung-jin, Lee Seok-yoon	Ryo Tamura	Naoki Kotani	April 3, 2016	July 22, 2017 (Note: The English dub of Yu-Gi-Oh! Arc-V episodes 100–133 first premiered in Canada on Teletoon.)	January 13, 2018
101	2	"Realm of The Cipher Dragon" / Galaxy Eyes; Transliteration: "Ginga no Manako" (Japanese: 銀河の眼)	Junichi Takahashi Animation director: Shinichi Shigematsu, Kazuyuki Ikai	Tsutomu Kamishiro	Tsukasa Sunaga	April 10, 2016	July 29, 2017	January 20, 2018
102	3	"Rush For Revenge" / The Merciless Hunter; Transliteration: "Hijō no Karyūdo" (Japanese: 非情の狩人)	Keiichirou Mochizuki Animation director: Toshi Shishikura	Tsutomu Kamishiro	Tsukasa Sunaga	April 24, 2016	August 5, 2017	January 27, 2018
103	4	"Rise of the Resistance" / The Brilliant Machine Angels; Transliteration: "Hanabanashiki Kikai Tenshi" (Japanese: 華々しき機械天使)	Kimiharu Muto, Ryūta Yamamoto Animation director: Yuya Kawamura	Tsutomu Kamishiro	Ryūta Yamamoto	May 1, 2016	August 12, 2017	February 3, 2018
104	5	"Rumble in the Rubble" / The Hero Named "D"; Transliteration: ""Dī" no Na o Motsu Hīrō" (Japanese: 「D」の名を持つHERO)	Kang-Min Lee Animation director: Lee Sung-jin, Lee Seok-yoon	Tsutomu Kamishiro	Masahiro Takada	May 8, 2016	August 19, 2017	February 10, 2018
105	6	"Fighting For Friendship" / Bonds of the Resistance; Transliteration: "Rejisutansu no Kizuna" (Japanese: レジスタンスの絆)	Ippei Yokota Animation director: Tomoaki Kado, Eiichi Tokura	Ryo Tamura	Tsukasa Sunaga	May 15, 2016	August 26, 2017	February 17, 2018
106	7	"An Academic Test" / Arc Area Project; Transliteration: "Āku Eria Purojekuto" (Japanese: アークエリア･プロジェクト)	Yoshihide Yuuzumi Animation director: Teruhiko Yamazaki, Issei Hasegawa, Mizuki Satou	Tsutomu Kamishiro	Yukio Nishimoto	May 22, 2016	September 2, 2017	February 24, 2018
107	8	"Belles and Whistles" / The Duel-Starved Amazoness; Transliteration: "Dyueru ni Ueta Amazonesu" (Japanese: 決闘に飢えたアマゾネス)	Naoki Kotani Animation director: Hidekazu Ebina	Tsutomu Kamishiro	Naoki Kotani	May 29, 2016	September 9, 2017	March 3, 2018
108	9	"Twins with 'Tude" / Amazoness Trap; Transliteration: "Amazonesu Torappu" (Japanese: アマゾネス･トラップ)	Yoshitaka Koyama Animation director: Toshihiko Masuda	Tsutomu Kamishiro	Katsumi Ono	June 5, 2016	September 15, 2017	March 10, 2018
109	10	"Surprise Showing" / The Falcon Perishes on the Battlefield; Transliteration: "Senjō ni Hateru Hayabusa" (Japanese: 戦場に果てる隼)	Yasuyuki Fuse Animation director: Lee Sung-jin, Lee Seok-yoon	Tsutomu Kamishiro	Tsukasa Sunaga	June 12, 2016	September 22, 2017	March 17, 2018
110	11	"Fenced In" / The Torn "Smile World"; Transliteration: "Yabukareta Sumairu Wārudo" (Japanese: 破かれたスマイル・ワールド)	Keiichirou Mochizuki Animation director: Toshi Shishikura	Atsushi Maekawa	Masahiro Takada	June 19, 2016	September 29, 2017	March 24, 2018
111	12	"Last Laugh" / Pendulum Heart; Transliteration: "Pendyuramu Hāto" (Japanese: ペンデュラムハート)	Ryūta Yamamoto Animation director: Noh Gil-bo	Ryo Tamura	Ryūta Yamamoto	June 26, 2016	October 6, 2017	March 31, 2018
112	13	"Hat Trick" / Leo's Security Army; Transliteration: "Reo no chian-gun" (Japanese: レオの治安軍)	Junichi Takahashi Animation director: Shinichi Shigematsu, Kazuyuki Ikai	Tsutomu Kamishiro	Yukio Nishimoto	July 3, 2016	October 13, 2017	April 7, 2018
113	14	"Joy of Revenge" / The Thirst for Carnage; Transliteration: "Shura no Katsubō" (Japanese: 修羅の渇望)	Kimiharu Muto Animation director: Yuya Kawamura	Ryo Tamura	Masahiro Takada	July 10, 2016	October 20, 2017	April 14, 2018
114	15	"All Duel Hands on Deck" / The Supergalaxy Shining in the Darkness; Transliteration: "Yami ni Kagayaku Chōginga" (Japanese: 闇に輝く超銀河)	Kang-Min Lee Animation director: Lee Sung-jin, Lee Seok-yoon	Tsutomu Kamishiro	Tsukasa Sunaga	July 17, 2016	October 27, 2017	April 21, 2018
115	16	"Shiver Me Lancers" / Duel Pirate Captain Solo; Transliteration: "Dyueru Kaizoku Kyaputen Soro" (Japanese: 決闘海賊キャプテン・ソロ)	Yasumi Mikamoto Animation director: Teruhiko Yamazaki, Issei Hasegawa, Mizuki Satou	Atsushi Maekawa	Yoshihisa Matsumoto	July 24, 2016	November 3, 2017	April 28, 2018
116	17	"A Towering Achievement" / Guardians of the Sun and Moon; Transliteration: "Taiyō to Tsuki no Shugosha" (Japanese: 太陽と月の守護者)	Naoki Kotani Animation director: Hidekazu Ebina	Atsushi Maekawa	Naoki Kotani	July 31, 2016	November 10, 2017	May 5, 2018
117	18	"Grip of the Parasite" / The Sinister Bell's Chime; Transliteration: "Kiba o Muku Suzu no Ne" (Japanese: 牙をむく鈴の音)	Yoshitaka Koyama Animation director: Toshihiko Masuda	Tsutomu Kamishiro	Masahiro Takada	August 7, 2016	November 17, 2017	May 12, 2018
118	19	"Survival of the Fittest" / Survival Duel; Transliteration: "Sabaibaru Dyueru" (Japanese: サバイバル・デュエル)	Yasuyuki Fuse Animation director: Lee Sung-jin, Lee Seok-yoon	Tsutomu Kamishiro	Yukio Nishimoto	August 14, 2016	November 24, 2017	May 19, 2018
119	20	"Family Face Off" / The Little Bird Trapped in Darkness; Transliteration: "Yami ni Ochita Kotori" (Japanese: 闇に落ちた小鳥)	Keiichirou Mochizuki Animation director: Toshi Shishikura	Atsushi Maekawa	Tsukasa Sunaga	August 21, 2016	December 1, 2017	June 2, 2018
120	21	"The Battle Beast"; Transliteration: "Batoru Bīsuto" (Japanese: バトル・ビースト)	Ryūta Yamamoto Animation director: Noh Gil-bo	Atsushi Maekawa	Ryūta Yamamoto	August 28, 2016	December 8, 2017	June 2, 2018
121	22	"Taming of the BB" / The Wicked Brand; Transliteration: "Saikyō no Rakuin" (Japanese: 最凶の烙印)	Junichi Takahashi Animation director: Kazuyuki Ikai, Toshie Fujiwara	Tsutomu Kamishiro	Masahiro Takada	September 4, 2016	December 15, 2017	June 9, 2018
122	23	"Show of Nature" / Glory on the Academia! Transliteration: "Gurōrī on ji Akademia!" (Japanese: グローリー・オン・ジ・アカデミア！)	Kimiharu Muto Animation director: Yuya Kawamura	Tsutomu Kamishiro	Katsumi Ono	September 11, 2016	December 22, 2017	June 16, 2018
123	24	"Fusion Destruction" / The Glorious Mechanical Dragon; Transliteration: "Eikō no Kikairyū" (Japanese: 栄光の機械龍)	Kang-Min Lee Animation director: Lee Sung-jin, Lee Seok-yoon	Ryo Tamura	Masahiro Takada	September 18, 2016	December 30, 2017	June 23, 2018
124	25	"Paraside Seeing" / The Revived Phantom Knights; Transliteration: "Yomigaeru Fantomu Naitsu" (Japanese: 蘇る幻影騎士団)	Yasumi Mikamoto Animation director: Mizuki Satou, Issei Hasegawa, Teruhiko Yamazaki	Atsushi Maekawa	Yoshihisa Matsumoto	September 25, 2016	January 5, 2018	June 30, 2018
125	26	"Rise of the Parasites" / The Blazing Dragon; Transliteration: "Rekka no Ryū" (Japanese: 烈火の竜)	Naoki Kotani Animation director: Hidekazu Ebina	Atsushi Maekawa	Naoki Kotani	October 2, 2016	January 12, 2018	July 7, 2018
126	27	"An Evil Ascends" / The Day the Devil was Born; Transliteration: "Akuma ga Umareta Hi" (Japanese: 悪魔が生まれた日)	Yoshitaka Koyama Animation director: Toshihiko Masuda	Tsutomu Kamishiro	Katsumi Ono	October 9, 2016	January 19, 2018	July 14, 2018
127	28	"Revival Zero"; Transliteration: "Ribaiburu Zero" (Japanese: リバイブル・ゼロ)	Yasuyuki Fuse Animation director: Lee Sung-jin, Kim Hye-jeong	Tsutomu Kamishiro	Yasuyuki Fuse	October 16, 2016	January 26, 2018	July 21, 2018
128	29	"What Lurks Beneath" / Decisive Battle! Spirit Tech Force; Transliteration: "Kessen! Supiritto Tekku Fōsu" (Japanese: 決戦！精霊機巧軍)	Keiichirou Mochizuki Animation director: Toshi Shishikura	Tsutomu Kamishiro	Shōji Nishida	October 23, 2016	February 2, 2018	July 28, 2018
129	30	"A Duel Within" / Glimpse of the Supreme King; Transliteration: "Haō no Henrin" (Japanese: 覇王の片鱗)	Ryūta Yamamoto Animation director: Noh Gil-bo	Tsutomu Kamishiro	Ryūta Yamamoto	October 30, 2016	February 9, 2018	August 4, 2018
130	31	"Duel Interrupted" / The Greedy Venomous Dragon; Transliteration: "Yokubukaki Mōdokuryū" (Japanese: 欲深き猛毒龍)	Junichi Takahashi Animation director: Toshie Fujiwara, Kazuyuki Ikai	Atsushi Maekawa	Tsukasa Sunaga	November 6, 2016	February 16, 2018	August 11, 2018
131	32	"Sibling Standoff" / The Light Shining in Eternal Darkness; Transliteration: "Tokoyami ni Sasu Hikari" (Japanese: 常闇に射す光)	Kimiharu Muto Animation director: Yuya Kawamura	Atsushi Maekawa	Masahiro Takada	November 13, 2016	February 23, 2018	August 18, 2018
132	33	"Sleight of Hands" / The Peerless Entertainer; Transliteration: "Kidai no Entāteinā" (Japanese: 稀代のエンターテイナー)	Kang-Min Lee Animation director: Lee Sung-jin, Kim Hye-jeong	Tsutomu Kamishiro	Noche Yagi	November 20, 2016	March 2, 2018	August 25, 2018
133	34	"A Father's Finale" / A Dazzling Entertainment Show; Transliteration: "Kagayakashiki Entame Shō" (Japanese: 輝かしきエンタメショー)	Yasumi Mikamoto Animation director: Mizuki Satou, Issei Hasegawa, Sayuri Ehara	Tsutomu Kamishiro	Shōji Nishida	November 27, 2016	March 9, 2018	September 1, 2018
134	35	"Relentless" / Allure of Darkness; Transliteration: "Yami no Yūwaku" (Japanese: 闇の誘惑)	Yoshitaka Koyama Animation director: Toshihiko Masuda	Ryo Tamura	Masahiro Takada	December 11, 2016	March 11, 2018 (Note: The English dub of Yu-Gi-Oh! Arc-V episodes 134–148 first premiered in Australia on 9Go!.)	September 8, 2018
135	36	"Time to Reunite!" / The Trembling Dimensions; Transliteration: "Yureugoku Jigen" (Japanese: 揺れ動く次元)	Naoki Kotani Animation director: Hidekazu Ebina, Yûko Ebara	Tsutomu Kamishiro	Naoki Kotani	December 18, 2016	March 17, 2018	September 15, 2018
136	37	"A Most Brutal Duel" / Reign of the Supreme Dragon King; Transliteration: "Haōryū Kunrin" (Japanese: 覇王龍君臨)	Yasuyuki Fuse Animation director: Lee Sung-jin, Kim Hye-jeong	Atsushi Maekawa	Yasuyuki Fuse	December 25, 2016	March 18, 2018	September 22, 2018
137	38	"A Dark Summoning" / The Rebellious Supreme King's Dragon Servant; Transliteration: "Hangyaku no Haōkenryū" (Japanese: 反逆の覇王眷龍)	Keiichirou Mochizuki Animation director: Toshi Shishikura	Atsushi Maekawa	Shōji Nishida	January 8, 2017	March 24, 2018	September 29, 2018
138	39	"Master of Disaster" / The Shadow-Winged Dragon; Transliteration: "Anyoku no Ryū" (Japanese: 暗翼の龍)	Ryūta Yamamoto Animation director: Noh Gil-bo	Tsutomu Kamishiro	Ryūta Yamamoto	January 15, 2017	March 31, 2018	October 6, 2018
139	40	"Clash Talk" / The Eyes Tainted by Darkness; Transliteration: "Yami ni Somaru Manako" (Japanese: 闇に染まる眼)	Kang-Min Lee Animation director: Lee Sung-jin, Kim Hye-jeong, Lee Seok-yoon	Tsutomu Kamishiro	Tsukasa Sunaga	January 22, 2017	April 1, 2018	October 13, 2018
140	41	"A Ray of Hope" / Pendulum of the Soul; Transliteration: "Tamashii no Pendyuramu" (Japanese: 魂のペンデュラム)	Kimiharu Muto Animation director: Yuya Kawamura	Tsutomu Kamishiro	Katsumi Ono	January 29, 2017	April 7, 2018	October 20, 2018
141	42	"Swinging Back Into Action" / Junior Youth Championship; Transliteration: "Juniayūsu Senshuken" (Japanese: ジュニアユース選手権)	Yasumi Mikamoto Animation director: Mizuki Satou, Issei Hasegawa, Sayuri Ehara	Atsushi Maekawa	Masahiro Takada	February 5, 2017	April 8, 2018	October 27, 2018
142	43	"Deja Duel" / Overflowing Memories; Transliteration: "Afureru Kioku" (Japanese: あふれる記憶)	Yoshitaka Koyama Animation director: Wakana Yamashina, Maiko Abe	Atsushi Maekawa	Noche Yagi	February 12, 2017	April 14, 2018	November 3, 2018
143	44	"Amateur Hour" / Soul of the Supreme King; Transliteration: "Haō no Tamashii" (Japanese: 覇王の魂)	Yasuyuki Fuse Animation director: Lee Sung-jin, Kim Hye-jeong	Tsutomu Kamishiro	Yasuyuki Fuse	February 19, 2017	April 15, 2018	November 10, 2018
144	45	"Showtime Showdown" / The Cursed Gear Mask; Transliteration: "Norowareshi Gia Masuku" (Japanese: 呪われし機械仮面)	Masahiro Takada Animation director: Yûko Ebara, Akemi Yokota	Ryo Tamura	Masahiro Takada	February 26, 2017	April 21, 2018	November 17, 2018
145	46	"Closure By Cards" / Endless Rebellion; Transliteration: "Owarinaki Hangyaku" (Japanese: 終わりなき反逆)	Ryūta Yamamoto Animation director: Noh Gil-bo	Atsushi Maekawa	Noche Yagi	March 5, 2017	April 22, 2018	December 1, 2018
146	47	"One Way Street to Defeat" / Dimension Highway; Transliteration: "Dimenshon Haiwei" (Japanese: ディメンション・ハイウェイ)	Kang-Min Lee Animation director: Lee Sung-jin, Kim Hye-jeong	Tsutomu Kamishiro	Ryūta Yamamoto	March 12, 2017	April 28, 2018	December 8, 2018
147	48	"One Last Duel" / The Unleashed Dragons; Transliteration: "Tokihanatareta Doragon" (Japanese: 解き放たれたドラゴン)	Kimiharu Muto Animation director: Yuya Kawamura	Tsutomu Kamishiro	Katsumi Ono	March 19, 2017	April 29, 2018	December 15, 2018
148	49	"That's a Wrap!" / The Miracle Drawn by the Pendulum; Transliteration: "Pendyuramu ga Egaku Kiseki" (Japanese: ペンデュラムが描く奇跡)	Masahiro Takada Animation director: Yûko Ebara, Akemi Yokota	Tsutomu Kamishiro	Katsumi Ono	March 26, 2017	May 5, 2018	December 15, 2018

== DVD releases ==
=== English ===
Konami Cross Media NY (Region 1)
Volume	Episodes	Release date	Ref.
Season 1, Volume 1	1–24	September 6, 2016	
Season 1, Volume 2	25–49	March 7, 2017	
Season 2	50–99	May 8, 2018	
Season 3	100–148	August 6, 2019	
