= Brink =

Brink may refer to:

== Places ==
- Brink, Virginia, United States
- Brink, West Virginia, an unincorporated community, United States
- Brink, Greenbrier County, West Virginia, a ghost town, United States
- Brink (norra delen), a location in Botkyrka Municipality in Sweden
- Brink tram stop in Amstelveen, Netherlands
- Brink Junior High School, South Oklahoma City, United States
- PAM Brink Stadium, Springs, South Africa

== Groups and organizations ==
- Brink's, security and protection company
- Brink Productions, a theatre company based in South Australia, Australia
- BRINK, a creative agency focused on branded entertainment based in the United States

== Arts and entertainment ==
- Brink!, 1998 Disney Channel film
- Brink (video game), a video game developed by Splash Damage

== People ==
- Brink, nickname of Robert Moore Brinkerhoff (1880–1958), American cartoonist

== Other uses ==
- Brink (surname)

== See also ==
- Brinkmanship or brinksmanship
- The Brink (disambiguation)
- On the Brink (disambiguation)
