= Brink (norra delen) =

- Village
- Location in Stockholm County
- Coordinates: 59°6′47″N 17°48′29″E
- Country: Sweden
- County: Stockholm County
- Municipality: Botkyrka Municipality

Population (2005)
  - Total: 77
- Time zone: UTC+1 (CET)
  - Summer (DST): UTC+2 (CEST)

Brink (norra delen) is a village in Botkyrka Municipality, Stockholm County, southeastern Sweden. According to the 2005 census it had a population of 77 people.
