= Binko =

Binko may refer to:

== Places ==
=== Mali ===
- Binko, Koulikoro, commune in Mali
- Binko, Sikasso, small town in Mali

== Other uses ==
- Binko, a talking ape in LostWinds (Wii-game)
