= Brink of Disaster! =

1972 film by John Florea

- Directed by: John Florea
- Written by: Leo S. Rosencrans
- Produced by: Jerry Fairbanks
- Starring: See below
- Cinematography: Emil Oster
- Edited by: William R. Lieb
- Release date: 1972
- Running time: 29 minutes
- Country: United States
- Language: English

Brink of Disaster! is a 1972 American film directed by John Florea.

== Plot ==
A student is held up in the library while a riot rages outside. As SDS protesters head to burn the library down, he has to fend them off with his baseball bat. This film opens with actual footage of civil disturbances in the 1960s, and moves on to images of historical American figures.

== Cast ==
- Ed Nelson
- Gary Crabbe

== See also ==
- List of American films of 1972
