= Love and Goodbye and Hawaii =

- Directed by: Shingo Matsumura
- Written by: Shingo Matsumura
- Starring: Aya Ayano; Kentaro Tamura
- Release date: March 4, 2017 (Osaka Asian Film Festival)
- Country: Japan
- Language: Japanese

Love and Goodbye and Hawaii (恋とさよならとハワイ, Koi to Sayonara to Hawai) is a 2017 Japanese romantic comedy film, written and directed by Shingo Matsumura.

== Plot ==
Rinko and Isamo are separated, living together in the same apartment. In finalising their separation, Rinko is still not quite ready to give up on the relationship, and perhaps Isamo is showing signs as well. Until Isamo's workmate starts to show signs of interest in him. The story is centred around the pair's attendance to a wedding in Hawaii, which brings matters to a head.

== Cast ==
- Aya Ayano
- Kentaro Tamura
- Risa Kameda
- Aoi Kato
- Momoka Ayukawa
