= Disaster (disambiguation) =

A disaster is an event that seriously disrupts a society or environment.

Disaster may also refer to:

== Arts, entertainment, and media ==
- Disaster (film), a 1948 drama film directed by William H. Pine
- "Disaster" (Dave song)
- "Disaster" (JoJo song), 2011
- "Disaster" (Star Trek: The Next Generation), a season 5 episode of Star Trek: The Next Generation
- "The Disaster" (The Amazing World of Gumball), a season 4 episode of The Amazing World of Gumball
- Disaster: Day of Crisis, a video game by Monolith Soft for the Wii
- Disaster! (musical), a 2016 Broadway musical
- Major Disaster, a former DC Comics supervillain and reluctant amoral superhero
- "Disaster", an episode of The Good Doctor
- "Disaster", a song by Relient K from the 2013 album Collapsible Lung
- Disaster (Attack Attack! EP), 2024
- Disaster Area (band), a German skate-punk band formed in the 1980s

== Other uses ==
- Disaster!, an attraction at Universal Studios Florida
- Natural disaster, such as a geologic process, hurricane, or earthquake

== See also ==
- Anthropogenic hazard, a human-caused disaster, including industrial and transport accidents as well as deliberate attacks such as terrorism or war
- Calamity (disambiguation)
- Catastrophe (disambiguation)
- Desaster, a German metal band
- Dishaster, Atari 2600 game
