= On the Brink of Destruction =

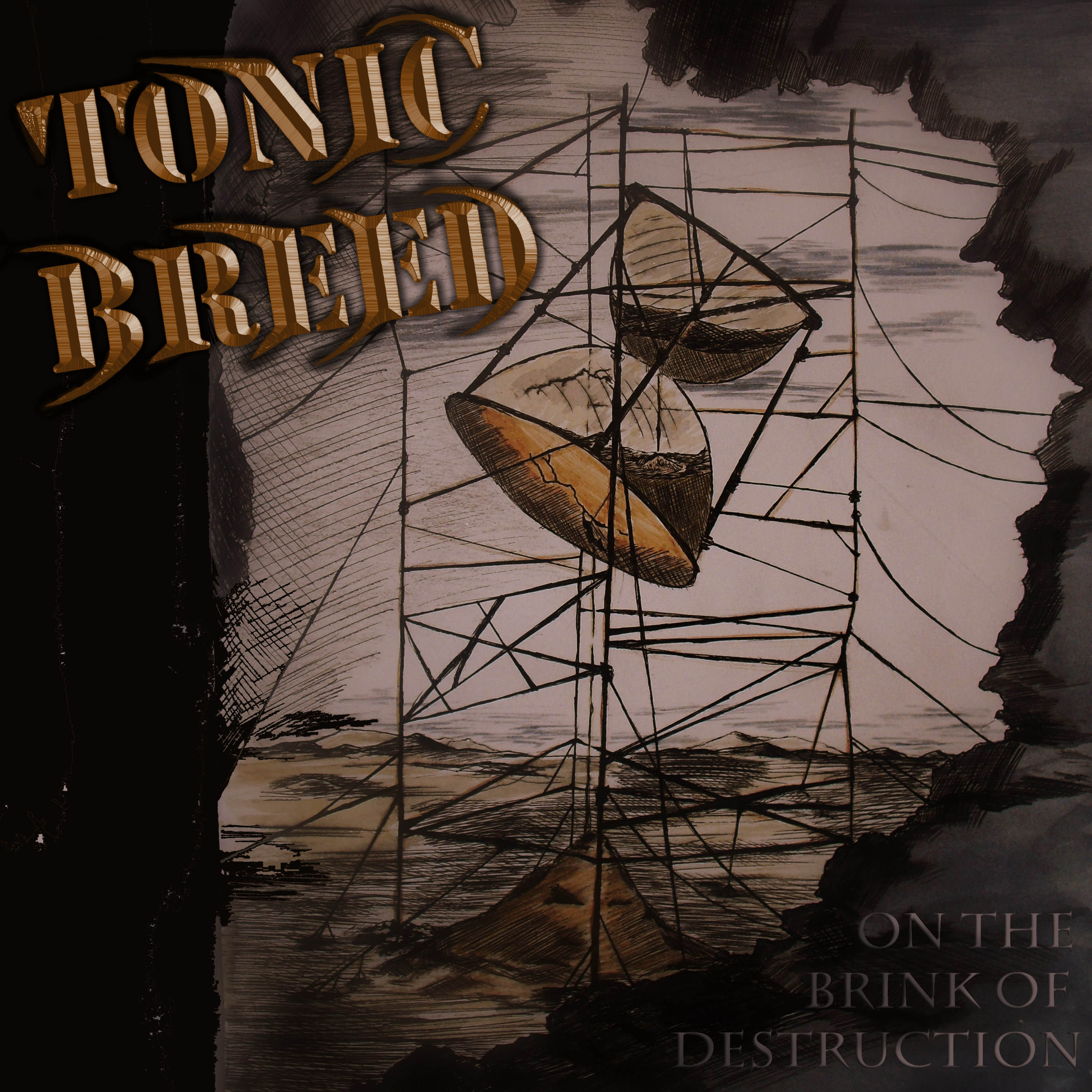

Studio album by Tonic Breed
- Released: November 24, 2010
- Recorded: July 1 to September 20, 2010 at Ocean of Time Studios in Fredrikstad, Norway
- Genre: Heavy Metal, Thrash Metal, Groove Metal
- Length: 49:35
- Label: Independent
- Producer: Patrik Svendsen, Lasse Jensen

Tonic Breed chronology
On the Brink of Destruction (2010)	Outsold (2014)

Professional ratings
Review scores
Source	Rating
Arctic Metal	8/10 stars
Melodic	3.5/5 stars

On the Brink of Destruction is the first studio album by Norwegian heavy metal band Tonic Breed. It was released on November 24, 2010.

== Background and recording ==
In May 2009, Tonic Breed won a live competition in Hvaler, Norway. The first prize was a full studio recording in Ocean of Time Studios in Fredrikstad, Norway.

The recording started July 2010 and finished two months later. Except for some guest performances in 2011, This was the last project to involve Bjørn Myhren before he left the band.

Before the recording, Tonic Breed had ten songs to be recorded. Two songs, Don't Fail Again and Oblivion, had already been recorded as demos in 2008. All songs ended up on the first album, except an unknown song from 2008 called Who I Am.

== Death in Small Doses (Put to Death) ==
A new version of the song "Death in Small Doses" had its release a year and a half after the release of debut album. It was remixed and remastered by Beau Hill. The remake got the added title Put to Death. It has no changes from the original song in the actual songwriting. The main difference lays in the sound, but there are minor differences in the actual mix of the two songs. Death in Small Doses (Put to Death) was released on March 5, 2012.

== Track listing ==
No.	Title	Music	Lyrics	Length
1.	"The Wait is Over"	Patrik Svendsen	Patrik Svendsen	5:36
2.	"Survive This"	Svendsen	Svendsen	5:51
3.	"Lowball"	Svendsen	Svendsen	5:19
4.	"Oblivion"	Svendsen, Bjørn Myhren	Svendsen	7:52
5.	"Desperate Call"	Svendsen, Daniel Pettersen	Svendsen	6:43
6.	"Don't Fail Again"	Svendsen	Svendsen	3:40
7.	"On the Brink of Destruction"	Svendsen	Svendsen	5:47
8.	"Suit the Day"	Svendsen, Pettersen	Svendsen	4:26
9.	"Death in Small Doses"	Svendsen, Myhren	Svendsen	4:27
Total length:				49:35

== Personnel ==
=== Tonic Breed ===
- Patrik Svendsen – Lead vocals, rhythm guitar
- Rudi Golimo – Bass guitar, backing vocals
- Bjørn Myhren – Lead guitar, backing vocals
- Daniel Pettersen – Drums

=== Technical Personnel ===
- Patrik Svendsen – Producer
- Patrik Svendsen And Lasse Jensen – Mixing
- Lasse Jensen – Engineer
- Anne Marthe Strand – Cover illustration
