= Battiscombe Gunn =

English Egyptologist and philologist (1883–1950)

Professor Battiscombe Gunn FBA
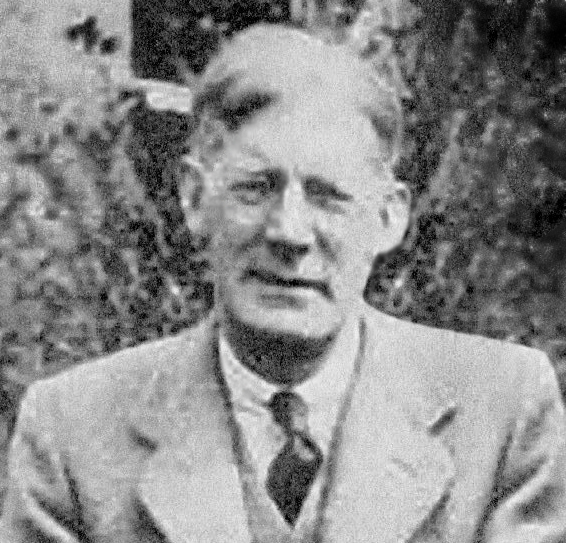
- Gunn in 1935
- Born: Battiscombe George Gunn; 30 June 1883; London, England
- Died: 27 February 1950 (aged 66); Oxford, England
- Title: Professor of Egyptology (1934–1950)
- Spouses: Lillian Florence Meacham; Constance Rogers
- Children: J. B. Gunn
- Awards: Fellow of the British Academy

Academic background
- Education: University College, London

Academic work
- Discipline: Egyptology and Philology
- Institutions: Egyptian Museum, Cairo; Penn Museum, Philadelphia; University of Oxford
- Notable students: Alec Naylor Dakin; T. G. H. James; Ricardo Caminos; Labib Habachi
- Influenced: J. W. B. Barns

Battiscombe George "Jack" Gunn FBA (30 June 1883 – 27 February 1950) was an English Egyptologist and philologist. He published his first translation from Egyptian in 1906. He translated inscriptions for many important excavations and sites, including Fayum, Saqqara, Amarna, Giza and Luxor (including Tutankhamun). He was curator at the Egyptian Museum in Cairo and at the University Museum at the University of Pennsylvania in Philadelphia. In 1934 he was appointed Professor of Egyptology at the University of Oxford, a chair he held until his death in 1950.

== Early life and background ==
Gunn was born in London, the son of George Gunn, a member of the London Stock Exchange, and Julia Alice Philp. His paternal grandparents were Theophilus Miller Gunn FRCS, a prominent London surgeon originally from Chard, and Mary Dally Battiscombe, from Bridport. Theophilus's father was John Gunn, a non-conformist preacher, brother of Daniel Gunn, originally from Wick in Scotland, but who spent most of his career in Chard. Both sides of the family were non-conformist. His unusual first name came from his grandmother's maiden name.

He was educated at Bedales School, Westminster School and Allhallows School, Honiton. These public schools were more liberal than the conventional Victorian Public Schools, and provided an open-minded environment. Bedales, in those days, attracted nonconformists, agnostics and liberal Jews. It had connections to Fabian intellectual circles, and to the Wedgwoods, Darwins, Huxleys and Trevelyans. At the age of 14, while still in school, he began to read hieroglyphs. He then went to a tutor in Wiesbaden, but returned to London at the age of 18, due to a change in family finances.

His father expected Jack to follow him to a career in the City, but he found he hated it. He tried banking, engineering, but they did not suit him. From 1908 to 1911 he was the private secretary to Pinero, which suited him better. In 1911, he moved to Paris where he worked as a journalist for the Continental Daily Mail.

He demonstrated a proficiency in languages from an early age, and began working with Egyptian hieroglyphs while still in school. While often described as entirely self-taught, the Griffith Institute Archives say that he studied hieroglyphs at University College, London, as a student of Margaret Murray.

== Early career, and involvement with the occult ==
In 1905, he played the role of "Priest of the Floods and Storms" in the Theosophical Society of London's production of The Shrine of the Golden Hawk, written and directed by Florence Farr. In 1906, his translation of "The Instruction of Ptah-Hotep and The Instruction of Ke'Gemni" (from the Prisse Papyrus in Paris) was published as part of the "Wisdom of the East" series of wisdom literature. He later considered the translation to be premature and said: "I entirely repudiate my translation of the Prisse Papyrus, so far as one can repudiate what is in print". But it was considered a considerable improvement over previous translations, and is still in print.

He also seems to have been involved with the leaders of both factions of the occult community in London at the time: Arthur Edward Waite of the magical order, the Golden Dawn, and Aleister Crowley, who created his own order, A∴A∴, after he left the Golden Dawn. On 10 January 1906, Gunn was inducted into Waite's "Independent and Rectified Rite". R. A. Gilbert's biography of Waite describes Gunn as "an artist, an Egyptologist and an oriental linguist", and says that, in 1910, he "argued at great length over the correct transliteration of Hebrew terms used in the Grade rituals". Crowley based his new religion, Thelema, on the translation of the Stele of Ankh-ef-en-Khonsu, also referred to as the "Stele of Revealing". He originally (1904) had it translated by the assistant curator of the Boulaq Museum in Cairo, under the supervision of the Egyptologist Émile Brugsch. In 1912, he arranged for another translation, by Gunn and Gardiner.

Crowley's periodical, The Equinox, contained a series of parodies aimed at Waite. In two of these, Battiscombe Gunn appeared as a minor character. In Volume 1, number 8 (Sept. 1912), Gunn appears in "Waite's Wet", a fictitious account of Waite's return to Crowley's group: "Waite's photograph, frock-coat and all, was carried in its red plush frame shoulder high by Mr. Battiscombe Gunn..." In Volume 1, number 10 (Sept 1913), Gunn appears in "Dead Weight" a false description of Waite's death (he actually lived until the 1940s): "Mr. Battiscombe Gunn was rapidly revising the funeral arrangements of the dying saint, which he proposed to found on some unedited documents of the Second Dynasty, which showed conclusively that the sacred lotus was, in reality, a corset, and the Weapon of Men Thu a button-hook". Letters from Crowley to Gunn indicate that it was more than a casual acquaintance.

By 1918, Gunn had lost interest in the occult, but had become an admirer of another former member of the Golden Dawn, the British Buddhist Allan Bennett, also known as Bhikkhu Ananda Metteyya. Gunn was responsible for reintroducing Bennett and Clifford Bax (Bax was also a friend of Gunn's first wife, Meena, and her son Patrick, later Spike, Hughes.). This led to Bennett delivering a series of discourses on Buddhism in Bax's studio, in 1919 and 1920. These were incorporated in Bennett's The Wisdom of the Aryas (1923).

Gunn experienced a conflict between the scientific and secular aspect of his professional career, and his spiritual interests. He next turned his interest to Freudian psychoanalysis. By 1922, he was spending the summers (when he was not on excavations in Egypt) in Vienna, where Meena was studying under Freud.

By the 1930s, Gunn had turned completely against the occult. He was highly antagonistic to Frederic H. Wood, who claimed that a long-dead Egyptian princess spoke, in ancient Egyptian, through "Rosemary". This form of "speaking in tongues" is known as xenoglossy. Rosemary's utterances were recorded phonetically and an Egyptologist, Mr. Hulme, claimed that Rosemary's speech conformed to the ancient Egyptian tongue, and could be translated into English. In the June 1937, issue of the Journal of Egyptian Archaeology, Gunn claimed that Hulme had manipulated the transcriptions to fit his own expectations of what he imagined ancient Egyptian to sound like. A later examination by John D. Ray (then the Sir Herbert Thompson Professor of Egyptology at the University of Cambridge) confirmed "there could be no mistaking Hulme's incompetence". Furthermore, both Gunn and Ray pointed out that Rosemary's visions of camels as domestic transport were inconsistent, as camels were not used for transport in 18th Dynasty Egypt. Wood's book on the subject, Egyptian Miracle, makes repeated derogatory references to Gunn, including "Also, the passing of our opponent Battiscombe Gunn, in 1950, can be recorded with the comment, De mortuis nil nisi bonum".

== Professional career ==
Before he went to Paris in 1911, he had met Alan Gardiner. They remained lifelong friends, and Gardiner was named in his will to co-ordinate the disposition of his professional papers. In 1913 he visited Egypt for the first time, as epigrapher on the staff of Flinders Petrie's excavation at Harageh, near Fayum, working with Reginald Engelbach. The outbreak of World War I prevented him returning for the following season. Returning to England, he enlisted in the Artists Rifles, but was invalided out in 1915.

From 1915 to 1920, he worked as an assistant to Gardiner, primarily in the lexicographical work which led to the 1947 publication of Ancient Egyptian Onomastica. Of this period, Gardiner said: "He was a real Bohemian and much of his research was carried on in his own lodgings at dead of night". A series of articles written while working with Gardiner led to the publication, in 1924, of his major publication, Studies in Egyptian Syntax. In this book, he identified the unusual syntactical relationship between negation and tense, now known as Gunn's Rule. Gunn's Rule still appears in modern textbooks.

In the winter of 1921 and 1922, he was a member of the team led by Thomas Eric Peet and Leonard Woolley excavating at Amarna. He was then appointed (1922 to 1928) to the staff of the Service des antiquités de l'Égypte (the Service of Antiquities of the Egyptian government). During this time he worked with Cecil Firth in the investigations of the pyramid of Teti. He assisted in the translation of ostraca from the tomb of Tutankhamun. Using field glasses, he was able to read the name Sneferu in the tomb which was eventually shown to be the tomb of Hetepheres I.

He became assistant conservator of the Egyptian Museum in Cairo in 1928, the year in which his son, J. B. Gunn was born. During the time he lived in Maadi, outside Cairo, he experimented with the manufacture of papyrus, growing the plant in his garden. He beat the sliced papyrus stalks between two layers of linen, and produced successful examples of papyrus, one of which was exhibited in the Egyptian Museum in Cairo.

He moved to the University Museum at the University of Pennsylvania in Philadelphia in 1931 as curator of the Egyptian section. In 1934 he was given an honorary M.A. at Oxford, so he could be appointed Professor of Egyptology at the University of Oxford, a chair he held until his death. He was made a Fellow of Queen's College, and was elected a Fellow of the British Academy in 1943.

While at Oxford, he devoted himself to his pupils and his classes, at the expense of his own research. He was Editor of the Journal of Egyptian Archaeology from 1934 to 1939, and was in active correspondence with a large number of other Egyptologists, all over the world. During World War II several of his students (including Alec Naylor Dakin) worked on code breaking at Bletchley Park. Other students include Ricardo Caminos, Warren Royal Dawson, Peter Lewis Shinnie, Paul E. Kahle and T. G. H. James.

Agatha Christie's 1944 detective novel Death Comes as the End, set in Thebes in the Middle Kingdom, is based on a series of letters that he translated.

For the book Land of Enchanters: Egyptian Short Stories from the Earliest Times to the Present Day, published in 1947, he provided the English translation of both the Ancient Egyptian and Coptic stories. A revised edition was published in 2002.

== Personal life ==
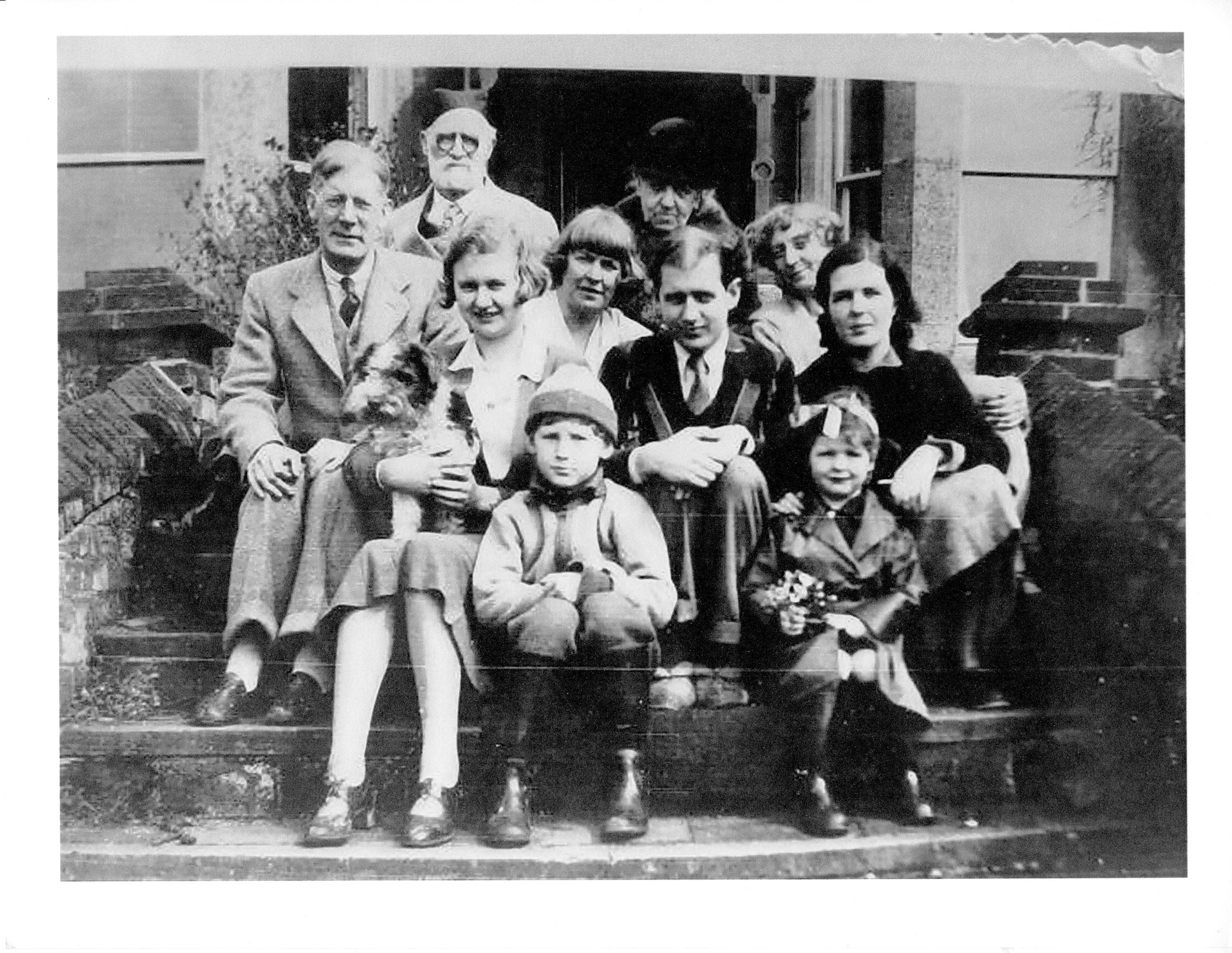
Family picture in 1935 Back Row: Charles S. Meacham (chemist, brewer, painter), Florence Meacham (painter) Second Row: Battiscombe Gunn, son in law (Egyptologist), Wendy Wood, daughter (Scottish nationalist), Meena Gunn, daughter (Freudian psychoanalyst) Third Row: Mary Barnish, granddaughter, with Meena's dog, Spike Hughes, grandson (musician, critic), Bobbie Hughes granddaughter-in-law Fourth (front) Row: J. B. Gunn, grandson (physicist), Angela Hughes, great-granddaughter.

By 1915, Gunn had become involved with Meena Hughes, the estranged wife of musician and Irish song collector Herbert Hughes. She was born Lillian Meacham, in Maidstone, Kent, but had spent most of her teenage years in Cape Town, South Africa, where her father, C.S. Meacham, was brewery manager and corporate chemist for Ohlsson's Brewery. She was given the nickname Meena by Orage, who said that her childhood blond plaits reminded him of Princess Wilhelmina. In her late teens, she returned to London to study piano at the Royal Academy of Music. Her younger sister was Gwendoline Meacham, who became a Scots Nationalist, and changed her name to Wendy Wood.

In addition to playing piano, for which she won 2 gold medals and then stopped playing, she became part of the circle around G. B. Shaw and H. G. Wells. She was a member of the Fabian Society and attended Theosophy lectures. In 1907, not long before her marriage to Hughes, she had a brief affair with the sculptor, printmaker and typographer Eric Gill, with whom both she and Gunn were lifelong friends. Gunn rented a cottage in Ditchling, where Gill was located, in the summer of 1919, and he, Meena and Pat all stayed there.

In 1915, in the midst of World War I, Meena was in Florence, Italy, visiting another suitor, a "rich American". Gunn escorted her seven-year-old son, Patrick Hughes (later Spike Hughes) from London to Florence, and then returned. In his autobiography, "Opening Bars", Pat describes his part in her decision to return to England and marry Gunn. Her divorce from Herbert Hughes, however, was not finalised until 1922.

During the early 1920s, while Gunn was working in Egypt during the season, Meena spent quite a lot of time in central Europe, and Gunn spent his summers there. In 1924, Meena studied psychoanalysis with Sigmund Freud in Vienna, and Sándor Ferenczi in Budapest. During this time, Gunn was asked to visit Freud and look at his Egyptian antiquities. He never said anything to Freud, but he was convinced that nearly all of them were fakes. Meena was a practising psychoanalyst for the following 45 years, into her 80s. While Gunn was Professor of Egyptology at Oxford, Meena maintained a psychoanalytical practice on Harley Street in London. After World War II she worked closely with Anna Freud, and in the 1960s she practised in the US

After she completed her psychoanalytic training, Meena accompanied Gunn while he was working in Egypt, and in 1928, their son J. B. Gunn, known as Iain, (later a physicist) was born in Cairo.

In 1940, Meena and Gunn were divorced, as Meena wanted to marry Alex Grey-Clarke, a young Harley Street doctor.

In 1948, Gunn married Constance Rogers, a librarian at the Ashmolean Museum.

Gunn's death on 27 February 1950, was preceded by some characteristic last words. He sent for his son Iain and Iain's fiancée, and as he lay on his death-bed, delivered a wise and paternal little speech on the advantages of marriage, and gave the two youngsters his blessing. Then he turned to his wife and said: "I shall look a bloody fool if I don't die after that, won't I?", and died within a few moments".
