= Samuel Peploe (disambiguation) =

Samuel Peploe (1871–1935) was a Scottish artist.

Samuel Peploe may also refer to:

- Samuel Peploe (bishop) (1667–1752), Bishop of Chester from 1726 to 1752
- Samuel Peploe Wood (1827–1873), English painter and sculptor
