= Wendy Wood (artist) =

Scottish political activist

- Wendy Wood (1932) by David Foggie
- Born: Gwendoline Emily Meacham; 29 October 1892; Kent, England
- Died: 30 June 1981 (aged 88); Edinburgh, Scotland
- Known for: Artist, activist

Wendy Wood, born Gwendoline Emily Meacham, (29 October 1892 – 30 June 1981) was a campaigner for Scottish independence. An eccentric and colourful figure, she was also an artist, sculptor and writer, and her theatrical political activism often created controversy.

== Biography ==
Wood was born in Maidstone in Kent, England, before her parents moved to South Africa, where her father was a brewery manager and landscape painter, and was brought up over there. Wood adopted her mother's maiden name in 1927 to emphasise her artistic connections. Her maternal grandfather was the sculptor Samuel Peploe Wood, and her great-uncle was the painter Thomas Peploe Wood. If challenged as to her Scottish birthright, she would reply, "One does not have to be a horse to be born in a stable", echoing the old proverb that is sometimes misattributed to the Duke of Wellington, albeit for a different purpose.

In 1928, Wood was one of the founders of the National Party of Scotland, which grew into the Scottish National Party, but, in the 1930s, decided that a non-party approach to Scottish independence was more effective. On Bannockburn Day in 1932, Wood led a group of nationalists into Stirling Castle, then an Army barracks as well as being open to tourists; to tear down the Union Flag and replace it with Scotland's lion rampant. Eric Linklater wrote that she flushed the Union Jack down the toilet, and she sued him for libel, eventually settling out of court for a farthing damages.

In the 1930s, Wood also founded the Scottish Watch, a youth organisation (not to be confused with a later, unrelated extremist organisation of the same name). In 1949, she had founded the Scottish Patriots, which, at the time of her death in June 1981, were some 2,000 strong.

In the 1950s came protests against the use of the regnal title "Elizabeth II" in Scotland, as Scotland had not had an Elizabeth I (see also the case of MacCormick v. Lord Advocate). Wood hung an effigy of the Secretary of State for Scotland in Glasgow in 1950 and displayed a Home Rule banner at that year's Highland Games. Wood was arrested and spent spells in prison on several occasions.

From 1956, Wood(who had studied art under Walter Sickert), shared an artist's studio and house with her partner, Florence St John Cadell at Whinmill Brae in Edinburgh. The house is now split in two and addressed as 17 and 18 Coltbridge Gardens. Wood's portrait by Florence St John Cadell is held by the Scottish National Portrait Gallery.

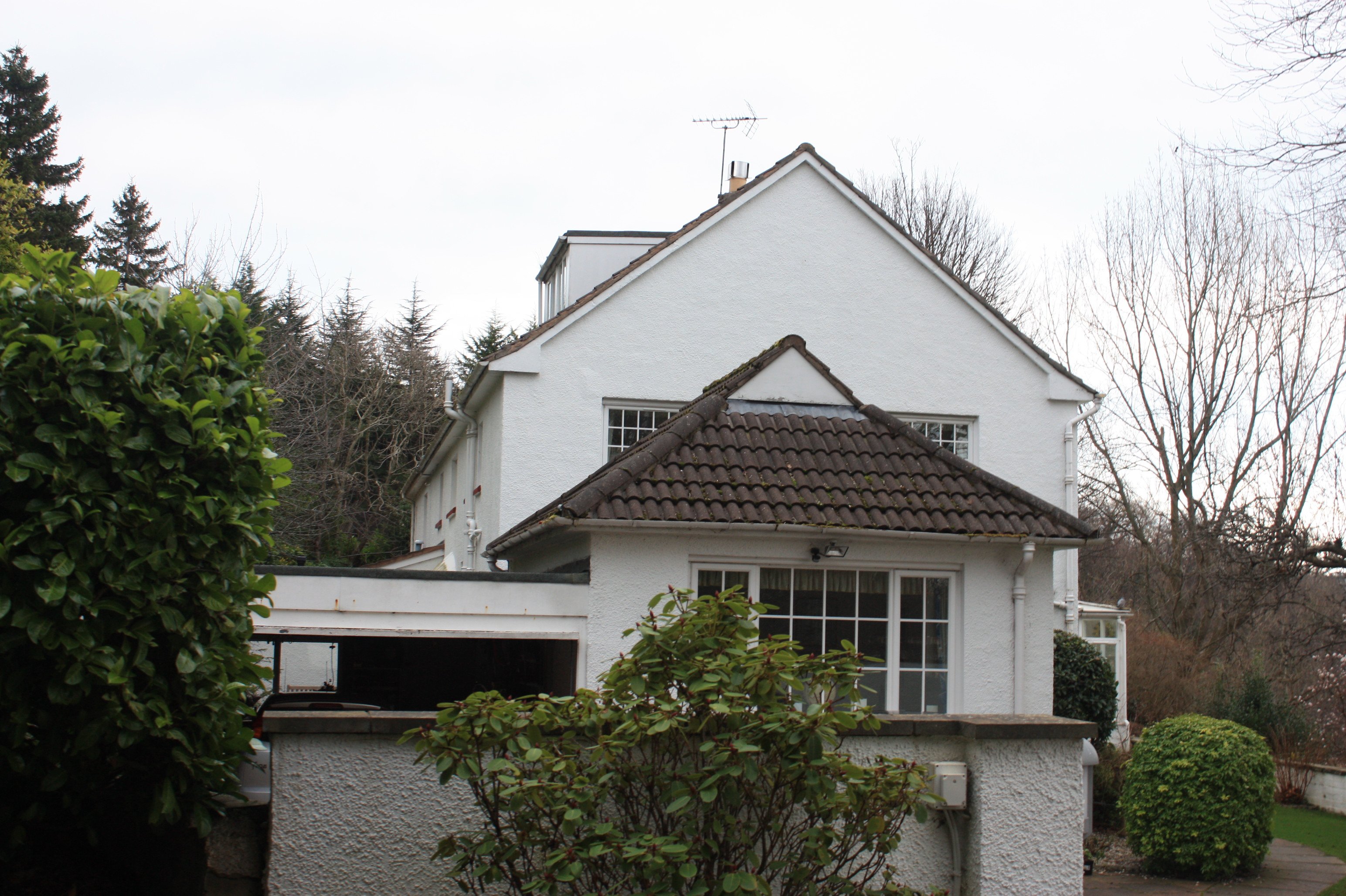
The studio at Whinmill Brae, Edinburgh

In 1960, Wood spoke at the General Assembly of the Church of Scotland, to try to mobilise them behind the re-convening of the Scottish Parliament, which she asserted had not been properly dissolved in 1707, merely adjourned. This request was turned down.

Wood engaged in many international campaigns, for Irish causes, to the remembrance of the British concentration camps during the Second Boer War which killed thousands, to supporting the Indian independence movement and supporting the Icelandic people in their 1970s cod war over fishing grounds.

In 1972, came Wood's hunger strike for home rule, which effectively failed, but in 1979, Scots were given a referendum on the matter.

In the early-1970s Wood often read Scottish stories on the BBC children's TV programme Jackanory under the name Auntie Gwen. Having spent over a decade as a crofter in Moidart (moving to Edinburgh in 1952) she had a wide span of experience to call upon. In all she wrote ten books, the last being her autobiography, Yours Sincerely for Scotland. Later in the 1970s, she unsuccessfully stood as a candidate in an election to be Rector of the University of Dundee with the support of the university's Scottish Nationalist Association.

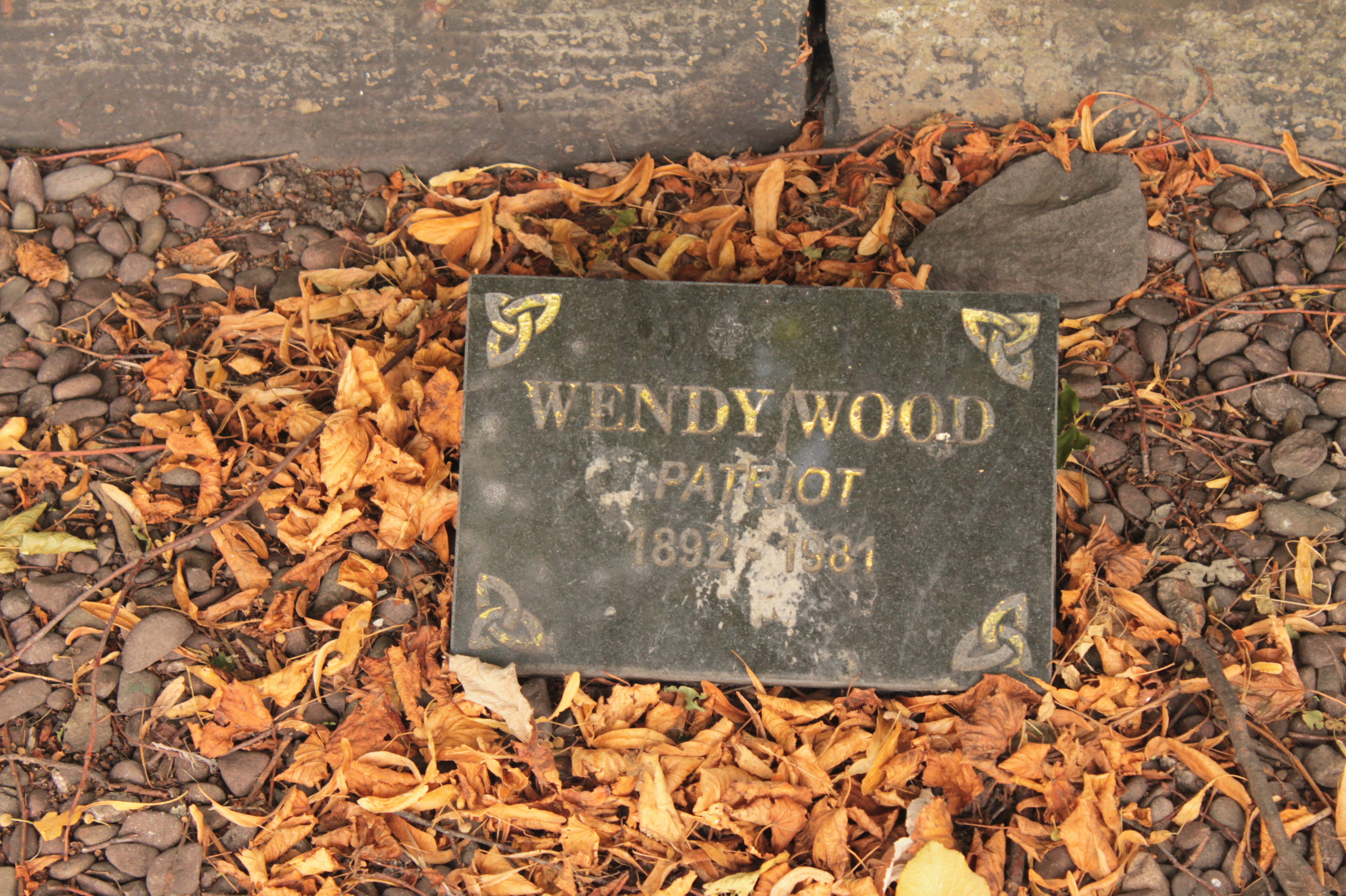
Memorial to Wendy Wood, Old Calton Burial Ground

Wood remained active into her late-eighties. She died in Edinburgh on 30 June 1981, aged 88. A small memorial was placed in Old Calton Cemetery in 2021. It lies near the north parapet wall on Waterloo Place.

== Family ==
Wood was the aunt of both the physicist J. B. Gunn and the musician Spike Hughes, and granddaughter of Samuel Peploe Wood. She was also the sister-in-law of the Egyptologist Battiscombe Gunn and the musician Herbert Hughes.

== Publications ==
- Wood, Wendy (1930). The Secret of Spey. Edinburgh: Robert Grant & Son.
- Wood, Wendy (1938). I Like Life. Edinburgh, London: The Moray Press.
- Wood, Wendy (1946). Mac's croft. London: F. Muller, Ltd.
- Wood, Wendy (1950). Moidart and Morar. Edinburgh: The Moray Press.
- Wood, Wendy (1952). Tales of the Western Isles. London: Oliver and Boyd.
- Wood, Wendy (1952). From a Highland croft. Edinburgh: Oliver & Boyd.
- Wood, Wendy (1970). Yours sincerely for Scotland. London: Barker. ISBN 0-213-00046-6.
- Wood, Wendy (1973). Legends of the Borders. Aberdeen: Impulse Books. ISBN 0-901311-34-0.
- Wood, Wendy (1980). Silver Chanter. London: Chatto & Windus. ISBN 0-7011-2448-2.
- Wood, Wendy (1985). Astronauts and Tinkers. Edinburgh: Heritage Society of Scotland. ISBN 0951050419.
