= Brian Ridley =

British solid-state physicist (1931–2024)

Brian Ridley FRS
- Born: 2 March 1931; Newcastle Upon Tyne, England
- Died: 22 May 2024 (aged 93)
- Education: University of Durham
- Known for: Ridley–Watkins–Hilsum theory
- Awards: FRS (1994); Dirac Medal of the IOP (2001)
- Scientific career
- Fields: solid-state physics; semiconductor theory
- Workplaces: University of Essex

Brian Kidd Ridley FRS (2 March 1931 – 22 May 2024) was a British solid-state physicist specialising in semiconductor theory. He was an emeritus professor at the University of Essex.

== Early life and education ==
Ridley was born on 2 March 1931. He educated at the University of Durham. He received a BSc degree in physics in 1953 and completed his doctoral studies in 1957.

== Career ==
Ridley began his career as a research physicist in the solid-state physics division of the Mullard Research Laboratories in Redhill, Surrey (1956–1964). In 1964, he joined the University of Essex as a lecturer in physics, later becoming a senior lecturer (1967), reader (1971) and finally professor of physics (1984), before retiring in 2008. He has held distinguished visiting professorial appointments at Cornell University (1967) and the Danish Technical University (1969), and has held research appointments at Princeton, Stanford, Lund, Santa Barbara, Oregon, and Eindhoven.

== Research ==
Ridley conducted work on negative differential resistance (NDR), instabilities and hot-electron transport in semiconductors. In the early 1960s, he jointly discovered the electron transfer mechanism (Ridley–Watkins–Hilsum effect) which underlies microwave generation in Gunn diodes, and he was the first to discover the impurity barrier mechanism for NDR, and to demonstrate its existence in germanium. He was also the first to describe the consequences of NDR instabilities in terms of propagating dipole domains and current filaments. The existence of these nonlinear entities has been verified in a wide variety of solids. His work on acoustoelectric instabilities led to his invention of the microsonic analogue of the laser. He has made original contributions to the theory of electron transitions in solids, particularly impurity scattering and multiphonon processes. This work is the subject of his monograph Quantum Processes in Semiconductors, widely used as a reference text.

He wrote three popular books, Time, Space and Things (1976), which has been translated into multiple languages, The Physical Environment (1979) and On Science (2001).

== Death ==
Ridley died on 22 May 2024, at the age of 93.

== Awards and honours ==
Ridley was elected a Fellow of the Royal Society (FRS) in 1994. In 2001, the Institute of Physics awarded him the Dirac Medal in recognition of his four-decade long influence on the semiconductor theory.

== Selected works ==
=== Textbooks ===
- Ridley, B.K. (2017). Hybrid phonons in nanostructures. Oxford, United Kingdom: Oxford University Press. ISBN 978-0-19-878836-2.
- Ridley, B. K. (1999). Quantum processes in semiconductors. Oxford: Oxford University Press. ISBN 0-19-850579-5.
- Ridley, B. K. (1996). Electrons and Phonons in Semiconductor Multilayers. Cambridge: Cambridge University Press. ISBN 978-0-511-52934-4.

=== Books ===
- Ridley, B. K. (2016). Reforming science: beyond belief. Exeter: Andrews UK Limited. ISBN 978-1-84540-194-8.
- Ridley, B. K. (2001). On Science. Thinking in Action. Taylor & Francis. ISBN 978-1-134-53350-3.
- Ridley, B. K. (1976). Time, space, and things. Cambridge: Cambridge University Press. ISBN 978-0-521-48486-2.
- Ridley, B. K. (1979). The physical environment. Chicester: Ellis Horwood Halsted Press. ISBN 0-85312-142-7.

=== Research papers ===
- Ridley, B.K. (1982). "The electron-phonon interaction in quasi-two-dimensional semiconductor quantum-well structures". Journal of Physics C: Solid State Physics. 15 (28). IOP Publishing: 5899–5917. Bibcode:1982JPhC...15.5899R. doi:10.1088/0022-3719/15/28/021. ISSN 0022-3719.
- Ridley, B.K. (1963). "Specific Negative Resistance in Solids". Proceedings of the Physical Society. 82 (6). IOP Publishing: 954–966. Bibcode:1963PPS....82..954R. doi:10.1088/0370-1328/82/6/315. ISSN 0370-1328.
- Ridley, B.K.; Watkins, T.B. (1961). "The Possibility of Negative Resistance Effects in Semiconductors". Proceedings of the Physical Society. 78 (2). IOP Publishing: 293–304. Bibcode:1961PPS....78..293R. doi:10.1088/0370-1328/78/2/315. ISSN 0370-1328.
