= Daniel Gunn =

Daniel Gunn may refer to:

- Daniel Gunn (ice hockey) (born 1978), Australian ice hockey player
- Daniel Gunn (minister) (1774–1848), Scottish congregational minister
- Dr. Daniel Gunn, fictional character in Alas, Babylon
- Daniel M. Gunn, 19th century American politician
