= Warren Dawson =

Warren Dawson may refer to:

- Warren Royal Dawson (1888–1968), English Egyptologist
- Warren Dawson, bassist for the Kings of Rhythm
