= Florence St John Cadell =

Scottish artist and patriot

- Born: 14 August 1877; Cheltenham
- Died: 30 January 1966 (aged 88); Edinburgh
- Occupation: Scottish artist

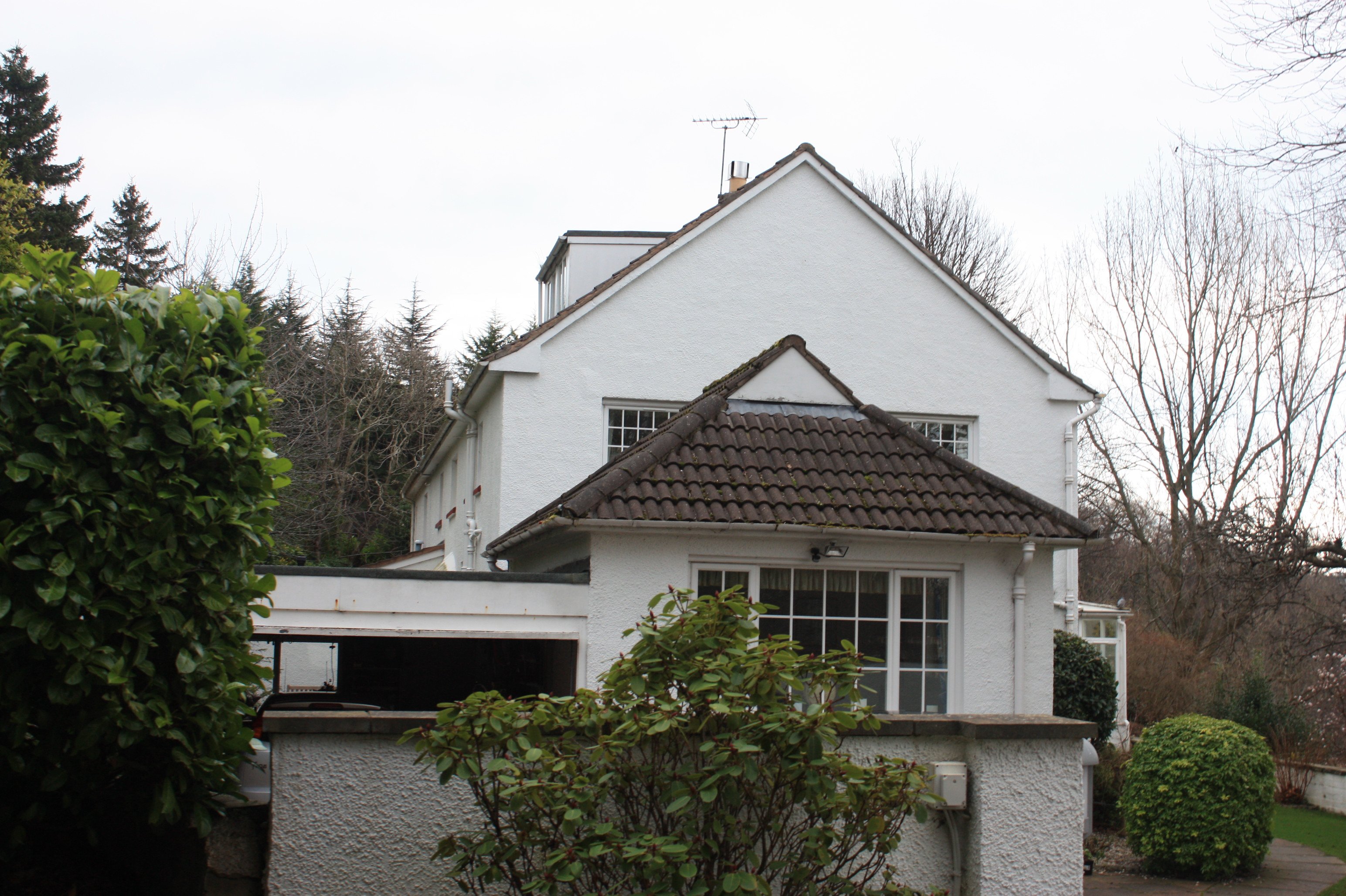
The studio at Whinmill Brae, Edinburgh

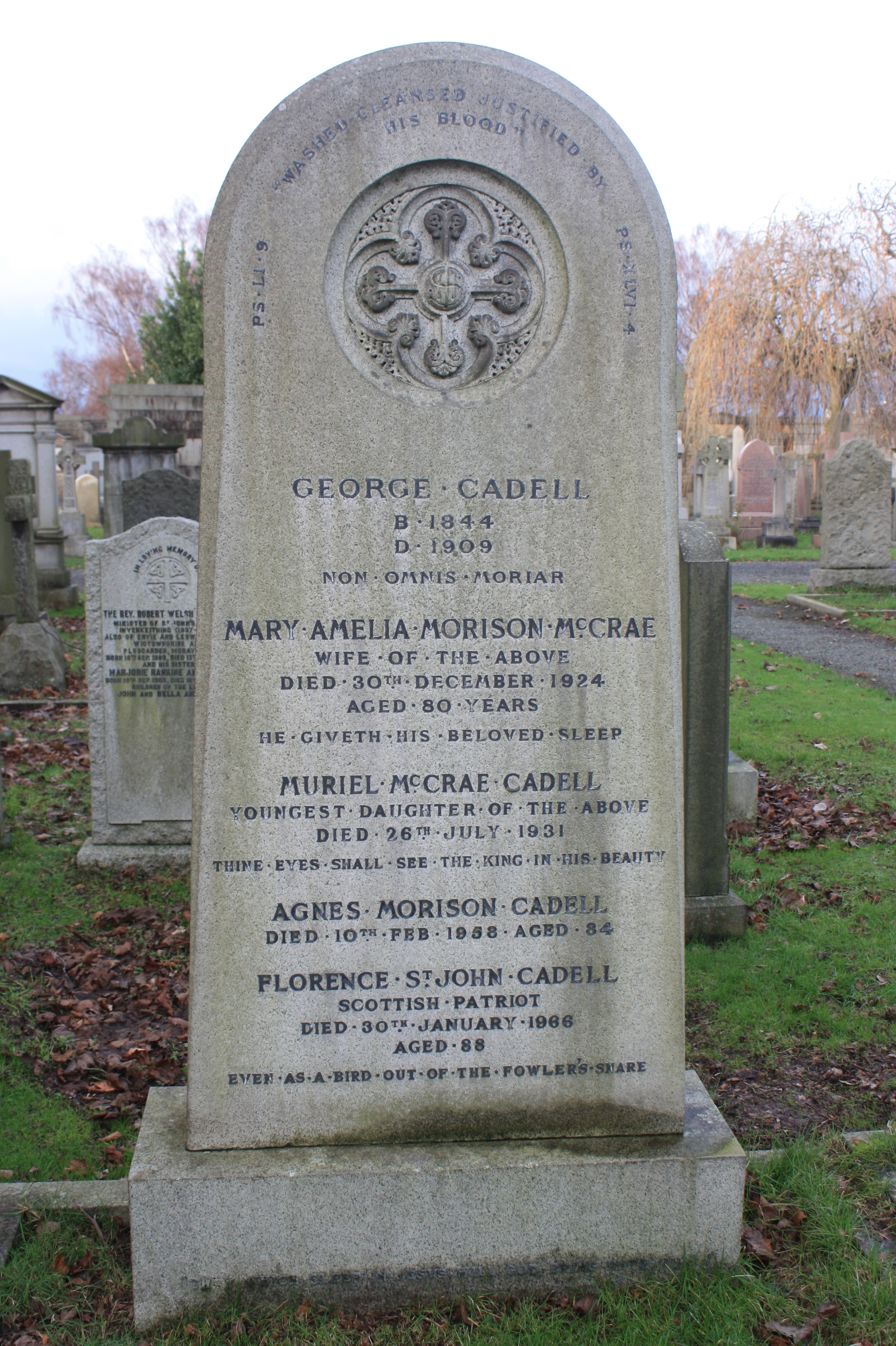
The grave of Florence St John Cadell, Dean Cemetery

Florence St John Cadell (14 August 1877, Cheltenham – 30 January 1966, Edinburgh) was a Scottish artist and patriot, involved in the early days of the Scottish National Party with her partner Wendy Wood. Her artworks are usually signed St John Cadell, disguising her femininity.

== Life ==
She was born in Cheltenham on 14 August 1877, the third of four daughters to George Cadell (1844–1909) and his wife Mary Amelia Morison McCrae (1844–1924). Her father was in the Indian Forestry Department. She was named after aunt Florence Cadell, who had adopted the name St John Cadell after marrying Berkeley Craven St John. She was a distant cousin of the Scottish artist Francis Cadell. Her elder sister, Agnes Morison Cadell (1873–1958) was also an artist. The family moved as a group to Scotland around 1896, following the death of the eldest sister, Mary Eliza Cadell, and only brother William Farquhar Cadell (1874–1894). Cadell appears to have tried to distance herself from her overtly upper class English roots, and often alleged an Australian birth. Her personal viewpoint quickly awoke to a personal identification as “Scottish”, and she was clearly a nationalist in her political views.

Cadell began exhibiting in the Royal Scottish Academy in 1900 and continued until 1965. Early work focussed on goats (which she kept at her house).

In the 1920s, Cadell and her sister Agnes jointly rebuilt Whinmill Brae House in Edinburgh as an artist’s studio. This still exists, in a hidden rural location on the Water of Leith between Donaldson's School and Dean Village. The pair spent some time in Crail in Fife and their work took on many of the picturesque themes of this fishing village. This period included short trips to other picturesque historic Fife villages, such as Culross.

From 1956, Cadell’s close artist friend Wendy Wood came to live with her and share her Edinburgh studio at Whinmill Brae. The house is now split in two and addressed as 17 and 18 Coltbridge Gardens. They had a joint exhibition of art in 1963.

She died on 30 January 1966 and is buried very close to her home, in Dean Cemetery. The grave lies in the north section. She is buried with both her parents, Agnes and her youngest sister, Muriel McCrae Cadell (1887–1931). The grave faces south on the south path of the Victorian north extension. The grave describes her as Scottish Patriot and bears lines from verse 7 of Psalm 124, “even as a bird out of the fowler’s snare”: a reference to escaping the troubles of life.

Cadell’s portrait of Wendy Wood (named The Patriot) is held by the Scottish National Portrait Gallery.
