= John Tooze =

British biologist (1938–2021)

John Tooze FRS
- Born: 16 May 1938
- Died: 19 May 2021 (aged 83)
- Education: Jesus College, Cambridge; King's College London
- Awards: EMBO Gold Medal
- Scientific career
- Fields: Biology
- Workplaces: King's College London; Nature
- Thesis: Studies on amphibian erythrocytes and erythropoietic tissues (1965)

John Tooze FRS (16 May 1938 – 19 May 2021) was a British research scientist, research administrator, author, science journalist, former executive director of EMBO/EMBC, director of research services at the Cancer Research UK London Research Institute and a vice president at The Rockefeller University.

== Early childhood and education ==
John Tooze was born and grew up in a terraced house on Thornbury Road in Perry Barr, Birmingham where he attended Thornbury Road Primary school. At his second attempt he passed the grammar school entrance exam and joined Handsworth Grammar School in Birmingham. In 1955 in the 6th form he won a State Scholarship and an Open Scholarship from Jesus College, Cambridge (BA, 1961). After leaving Handsworth School in 1955 he decided to spend 6 months working as a labourer in the cooperage of Ansells Brewery, Aston while waiting to begin two years of military service in the Royal Army Educational Corps in September 1956. He was discharged as a sergeant in September 1958 and after obtaining his BA from University of Cambridge he went on to earn a PhD in biophysics from King's College London in 1965 studying in the department where Maurice Wilkins and John Randall worked.

== Research and career ==
=== Research ===
Following his PhD, Tooze spent two years working as a postdoctoral researcher working on Bacteriophage genetics with James Watson at Harvard University. He returned to the UK and was appointed a lecturer at King's College London from 1965 to 1968. There he made a series of significant contributions to our understanding of the exocytic and endocytic pathways in neuroendocrine and exocrine cells and the exploitation of these pathways by enveloped animal viruses. He also provided the first evidence that endocytic membranes are used in the morphogenesis of vaccinia and human cytomegalovirus.

=== Positions with the journal Nature ===
Beginning in 1966 Tooze had been writing under the byline "our cell biology correspondent" a regular weekly column for the news and views section of the scientific journal Nature. From March 1968 to Sept 1969 he worked full-time as assistant and later as deputy editor working with the editor-in-chief John Maddox.

=== Research administration ===
Tooze served as executive secretary of the European Molecular Biology Organization (EMBO) for over 20 years and secretary of the European Molecular Biology Conference (EMBC). In 1982, he founded The EMBO Journal.

== Personal life ==
He was the father of historian Adam Tooze

== Death ==
Tooze died on 19 May 2021 at the age of 83.

== Awards and honors ==
Tooze was awarded the EMBO Gold Medal and EMBO Membership, both in 1986 and was elected a Fellow of the Royal Society (FRS) in 1994.

- 1986 Elected member of European Molecular Biology Organization (EMBO)
- 1986 Recipient of EMBO Gold Medal for contributions to promotion of molecular biology in Europe
- 1993 Elected member of Academia Europaea
- 1994 Elected Fellow of the Royal Society, UK
- 2016 Doctor of Science, h.c., Watson School of Biological Sciences, Cold Spring Harbor Laboratory, New York

== Timeline ==
- 1938 Born Birmingham, England
- 1949–1955 Handsworth Grammar School, Birmingham, England
- 1955 State scholarship
- 1955 Open scholarship, Jesus College, Cambridge
- 1956–1958 Military service British Army – final rank sergeant
- 1958–1961 Jesus College, Cambridge University – B.A. honors
- 1965 Ph.D. biophysics, University of London
- 1965–1967 Postdoctoral fellow – J.D. Watson laboratory Harvard University
- 1961 Staff member MRC Biophysics Unit, King's College, University of London
- 1963–1968 Lecturer, Department of Biophysics, King's College, University of London
- 1968–1969 Deputy editor, Nature, London
- 1970–1973 Research administrator, Imperial Cancer Research Fund (ICRF), Lincoln's Inn Fields, London.
- 1973–1994 Executive Secretary, European Molecular Biology Organization (EMBO), Heidelberg
- 1982–1993 Scientific Co-ordinator European Molecular Biology Laboratory (EMBL), Heidelberg
- 1993–1994 Acting director general, EMBL
- 1991–2015 Trustee of The Darwin Trust of Edinburgh
- 1994–2002 ICRF director of support services, Imperial Cancer Research Fund
- 2002–2003 Executive director of research integration and services, Cancer Research UK (formerly Imperial Cancer Research Fund)
- 2003–2005 Director of research services, Cancer Research UK
- 2005–2013 Vice president for scientific and facility operations, The Rockefeller University, New York, NY
- 2014 Retired

== Editorships ==
- 1976–1980 Editor: Cancer Reviews, BBA, Elsevier North Holland
- 1979–1985 Editor in chief: Trends in Biochemical Sciences (TIBS)
- 1982–2003 Executive editor: The EMBO Journal
- 1991–1999 Advisory editor, Bio Essays, Cambridge, UK
- 1993–2003 Associate editor, European Journal of Cell Biology
- 1993–2001 Editorial board, Structural Biology

== Books published ==
- Tooze, J., ed. (1972). Second Readings in Molecular Biology. London: Macmillan. ISBN 978-0-333-11181-9.
- Tooze, J., ed. (1973). The Molecular Biology of Tumour Viruses. Cold Spring Harbor: Cold Spring Harbor Laboratory. ISBN 0-87969-108-5.
- Tooze, J., ed. (1974). Selected Papers in Tumour Virology. Cold Spring Harbor: Cold Spring Harbor Laboratory. ISBN 978-0-87969-112-7.
- Tooze, J., ed. (1972). DNA Tumour Viruses. Cold Spring Harbor: Cold Spring Harbor Laboratory. ISBN 0-87969-142-5.
- Watson, J. D.; Tooze, J. (1981). The DNA Story. San Francisco: W. H. Freeman. ISBN 978-0-7167-1590-0.
- Watson, J. D.; Tooze, J.; Kurz, D. (1983). Recombinant DNA: A Short Course. San Francisco: W. H. Freeman. ISBN 978-0-7167-1484-2.
- Hunt, D.; Tooze, J.; Kurz, D. (1983). DNA makes RNA makes Protein. Elsevier Biomedical Press. ISBN 978-0-444-80491-4.
- Branden, C. I.; Tooze, J. (1991). Introduction to Protein Structure. New York: Garland. ISBN 978-0-8153-0270-4.
- Branden, C. I.; Tooze, J. (1999). Introduction to Protein Structure - 2nd Edition. New York: Garland. ISBN 978-81-532-3050-5.
