= Journal of Egyptian Archaeology =

- Cover of the Journal of Egyptian Archaeology
- Discipline: Archaeology
- Language: English
- Edited by: Claudia Näser

Publication details
- History: 1914–present
- Publisher: Egypt Exploration Society

Standard abbreviations
- ISO 4: J. Egypt. Archaeol.

Indexing
- ISSN: 0307-5133
- JSTOR: jegyparch

The Journal of Egyptian Archaeology (JEA) is a bi-annual peer-reviewed international academic journal published by the Egypt Exploration Society. Covering Egyptological research, the JEA publishes scholarly articles, fieldwork reports, and reviews of books on Egyptology. Articles are mainly published in English, with contributions in German or French accepted where suitable.

The JEA was established in 1914 by the Egypt Exploration Fund. Its editors have included several prominent Egyptologists, including Alan Gardiner (1916–21, 1934, 1941–46); T. Eric Peet (1923–1934) and Battiscombe Gunn (1935–1939). As of 2026, the current editor-in-chief is Eva Lange-Athinodorou of University of Würzburg.
