= Staffordshire County Museum =

- Location: Servants' Quarters, Shugborough Hall, Milford, Staffordshire, England
- Coordinates: 52.7995°N 2.0138°W
- Type: County Museum
- Owner: Staffordshire County Council
- Website: www.staffordshire.gov.uk/leisure/museums/Museums.aspx

Staffordshire County Museum is housed in the servants' quarters of Shugborough Hall, Milford, near Stafford, Staffordshire, England. The museum features a restored Victorian kitchen, laundry and brewhouse as well as permanent galleries and temporary exhibitions.

In November 2016, the management of the Shugborough Estate was returned to the National Trust and the museum at Shugborough was closed to the public. In March 2017, the estate was reopened by the National Trust including some of the displays which were part of the County Museum in the servants' quarters and farm. Staffordshire County Council intends in the future to move the County Museum Service to the planned new Staffordshire History Centre on the site of the Staffordshire Record Office.

== Collections ==
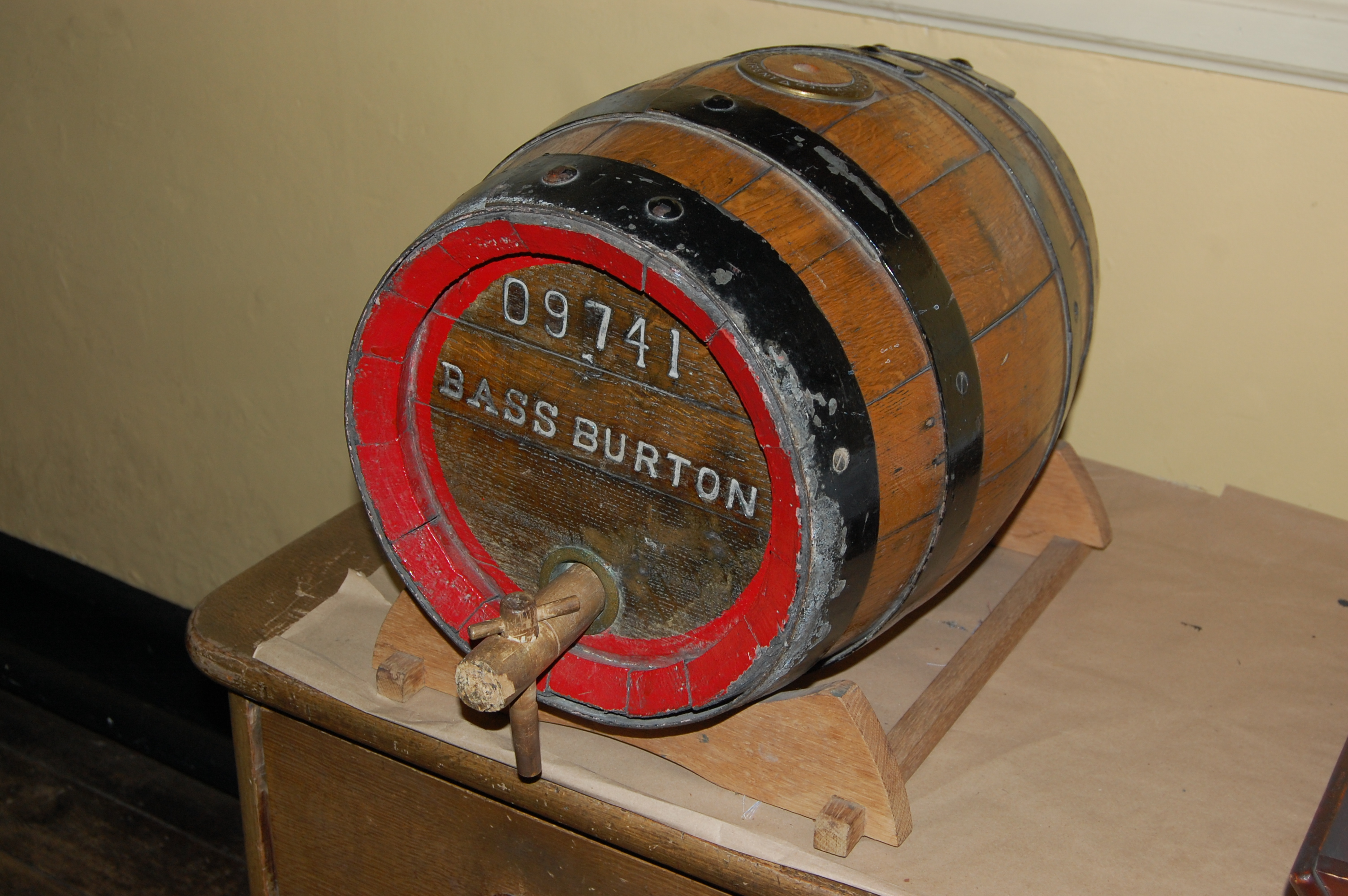
A small wooden barrel from the Bass Brewery; now in the museum

Staffordshire County Museum collects objects relating to Staffordshire life over the last 200 years. The museum exhibits objects from Staffordshire County Council's collections, which hold over 25,000 social history artefacts, 35,000 photographs and 1,800 items of fine and decorative art. The strength of the collections are items relating to domestic cooking, cleaning and laundry. Particular areas of collecting include costume and textiles, medicine, coins and medals, archives, social history and land transport. The large and varied photograph collection contains over 35,000 photographs covering Staffordshire places, buildings, people, trades, organisations, activities, entertainment, transport and events since the 1850s.

The collections reflect Staffordshire's social and agricultural history in areas such as:

- customs and beliefs
- public services
- education
- communications and currency
- warfare and defence
- transport
- shops and pubs
- crafts and trades
- childhood
- sport and entertainment
- health and infant raising

The museum houses a collection of internationally renowned horse-drawn carriages. These include carriages owned by the Earl of Shrewsbury at Ingestre, Staffordshire and the Dyott family of Lichfield, Staffordshire. The museum also houses the nationally significant Douglas Haywood Puppet Collection. Another highlight is the costume collection, which features costume and accessories from the last 400 years including wedding dresses, samplers and servants' costume. The museum holds a collection of shoes and boots from Lotus Ltd, Stafford and Stone's last shoe manufacturer. The fine art collection reflects the landmarks, landscape and people of Staffordshire, and includes locally and nationally known artists such as Thomas Peploe Wood (1817–1845), his brother Samuel Peploe Wood (1827–1873), John Prescott Knight (1803–1881) and Mabel Frances Layng (1881–1937).

These collections are displayed in galleries which explore themes including health, toys and costume as well as within the restored Victorian servants' quarters, recreated school room, chemist and tailor's shops. The museum's agricultural collections are displayed at Shugborough Park Farm. Access to the fine art and craft collections is provided through temporary exhibitions at the Shire Hall, Stafford as well as displays at the County Museum and Shugborough Park Farm. A growing number of photographs and objects from Staffordshire County Museum's collection are accessible online.
