= Gunn diode =

Form of diode

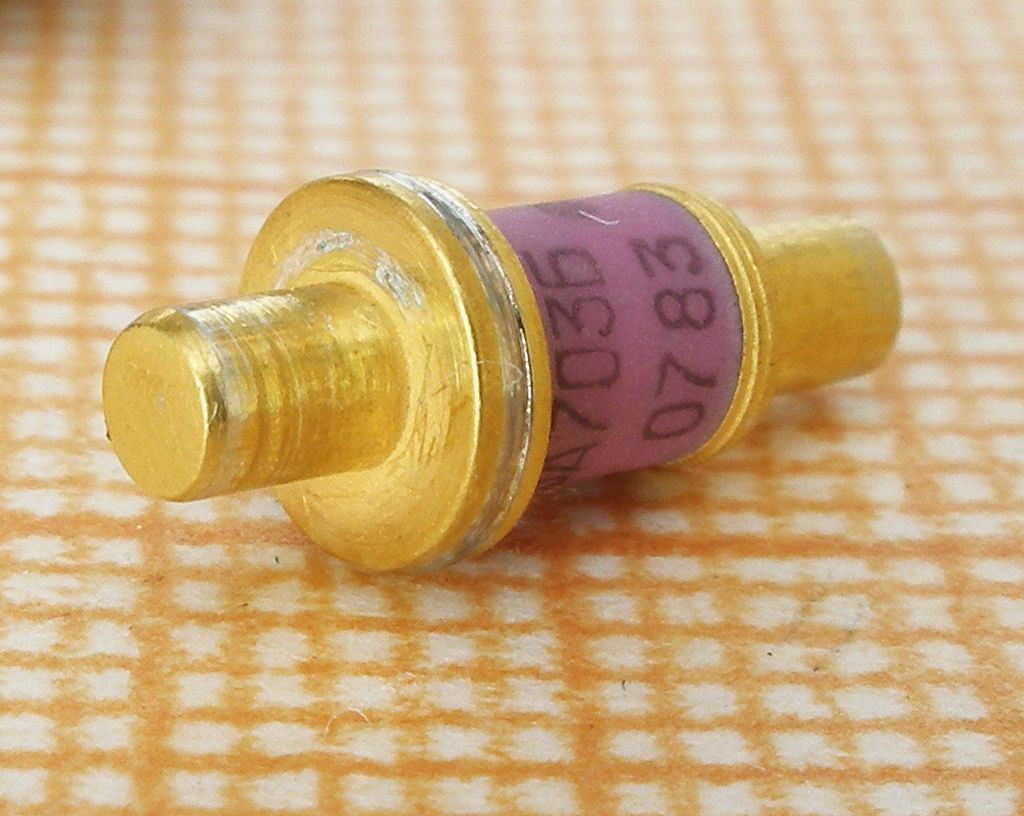
A Soviet-made Gunn diode

A Gunn diode, also known as a transferred electron device (TED), is a form of diode, a two-terminal semiconductor electronic component, with negative differential resistance, used in high-frequency electronics. It is based on the "Gunn effect" discovered in 1962 by physicist J. B. Gunn. Its main uses are in electronic oscillators to generate microwaves, in applications such as radar speed guns, microwave relay data link transmitters, and automatic door openers.

Its internal construction is unlike other diodes in that it consists only of N-doped semiconductor material, whereas most diodes consist of both P and N-doped regions. It, therefore, conducts in both directions and cannot rectify alternating current like other diodes, which is why some sources do not use the term diode but prefer TED. In the Gunn diode, three regions exist: two are heavily N-doped on each terminal, with a thin layer of lightly n-doped material between them. When a voltage is applied to the device, the electrical gradient will be largest across the thin middle layer. If the voltage increases, the layer's current will first increase. Still, eventually, at higher field values, the conductive properties of the middle layer are altered, increasing its resistivity and causing the current to fall. This means a Gunn diode has a region of negative differential resistance in its current–voltage characteristic curve, in which an increase of applied voltage causes a decrease in current. This property allows it to amplify, functioning as a radio frequency amplifier, or to become unstable and oscillate when it is biased with a DC voltage.

== Gunn diode oscillators ==
Current–voltage (I–V) curve of a Gunn diode. It shows negative resistance above the threshold voltage (V_{threshold}).

Gunn diodes are used in electronic oscillators that generate microwave signals. When the applied DC voltage exceeds a threshold, the current through the diode can oscillate even while the voltage remains constant. In gallium arsenide, a sufficiently strong electric field causes some electrons to scatter into a higher-energy conduction-band valley where their mobility is lower. In this regime, a local increase in field strength can reduce the average electron drift velocity. The resulting redistribution of charge can reinforce the local field and produce a high-field domain near the cathode. In transit-time operation, the domain travels to the anode and dissipates there, allowing a new domain to form near the cathode. The time taken for the domain to cross the active layer largely determines the period of the current oscillation.

When the diode is coupled to a resonator, its negative differential resistance at microwave frequencies can overcome the circuit losses, allowing small oscillations to grow. The oscillations reach a steady amplitude when the microwave power supplied by the diode equals the sum of the power dissipated in the resonator and the power delivered to the load.

The diodes oscillation frequency is determined partly by the properties of the middle diode layer but can be tuned by external factors. In practical oscillators, an electronic resonator is usually added to control frequency in the form of a waveguide, microwave cavity, or YIG sphere. The diode is usually mounted inside the cavity. The diode cancels the resonator's loss resistance, producing oscillations at its resonant frequency. The frequency can be tuned mechanically, by adjusting the size of the cavity, or in the case of YIG spheres, by changing the magnetic field. Gunn diodes are used to build oscillators in the 10 GHz to THz frequency range.

Gallium arsenide Gunn diodes are made for frequencies up to 200 GHz, gallium nitride materials can reach up to 3 terahertz.

== History ==
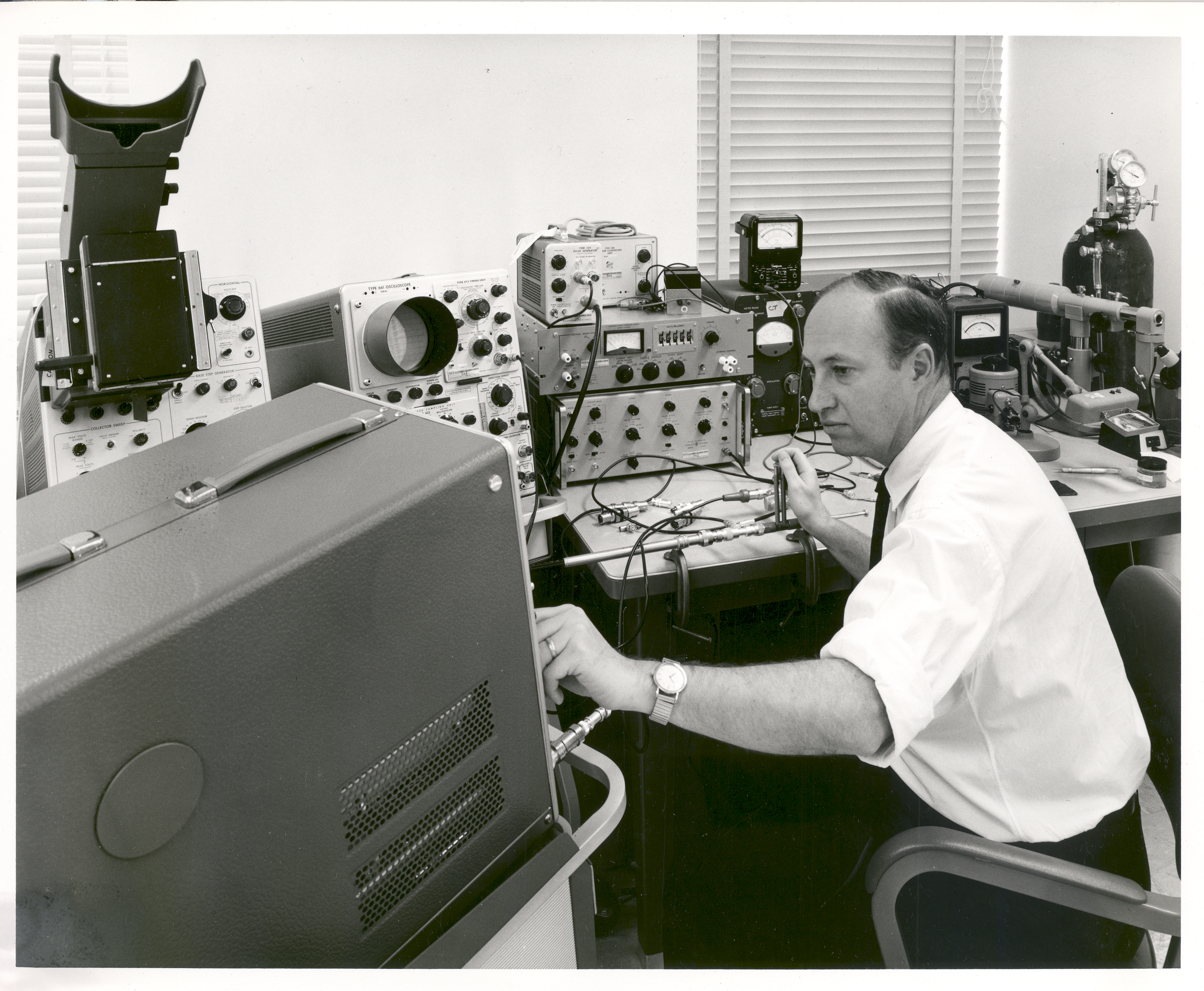
NASA ERC scientist W. Deter Straub conducting an experiment with the Gunn effect.

The Gunn diode is based on the Gunn effect, and both are named for physicist J. B. Gunn. At IBM in 1962, he discovered the effect because he refused to accept inconsistent experimental results in gallium arsenide as "noise", and determined the cause. Alan Chynoweth of Bell Telephone Laboratories showed in June 1965 that only a transferred-electron mechanism could explain the experimental results. It was realized that the oscillations he detected were explained by the Ridley–Watkins–Hilsum theory, named for British physicists Brian Ridley, Tom Watkins and Cyril Hilsum who in scientific papers in 1961 showed that bulk semiconductors could display negative resistance, meaning that increasing the applied voltage causes the current to decrease.

The Gunn effect and its relation to the Watkins–Ridley–Hilsum effect entered electronics literature in the early 1970s, e.g., in books on transferred electron devices and, more recently, on nonlinear wave methods for charge transport.

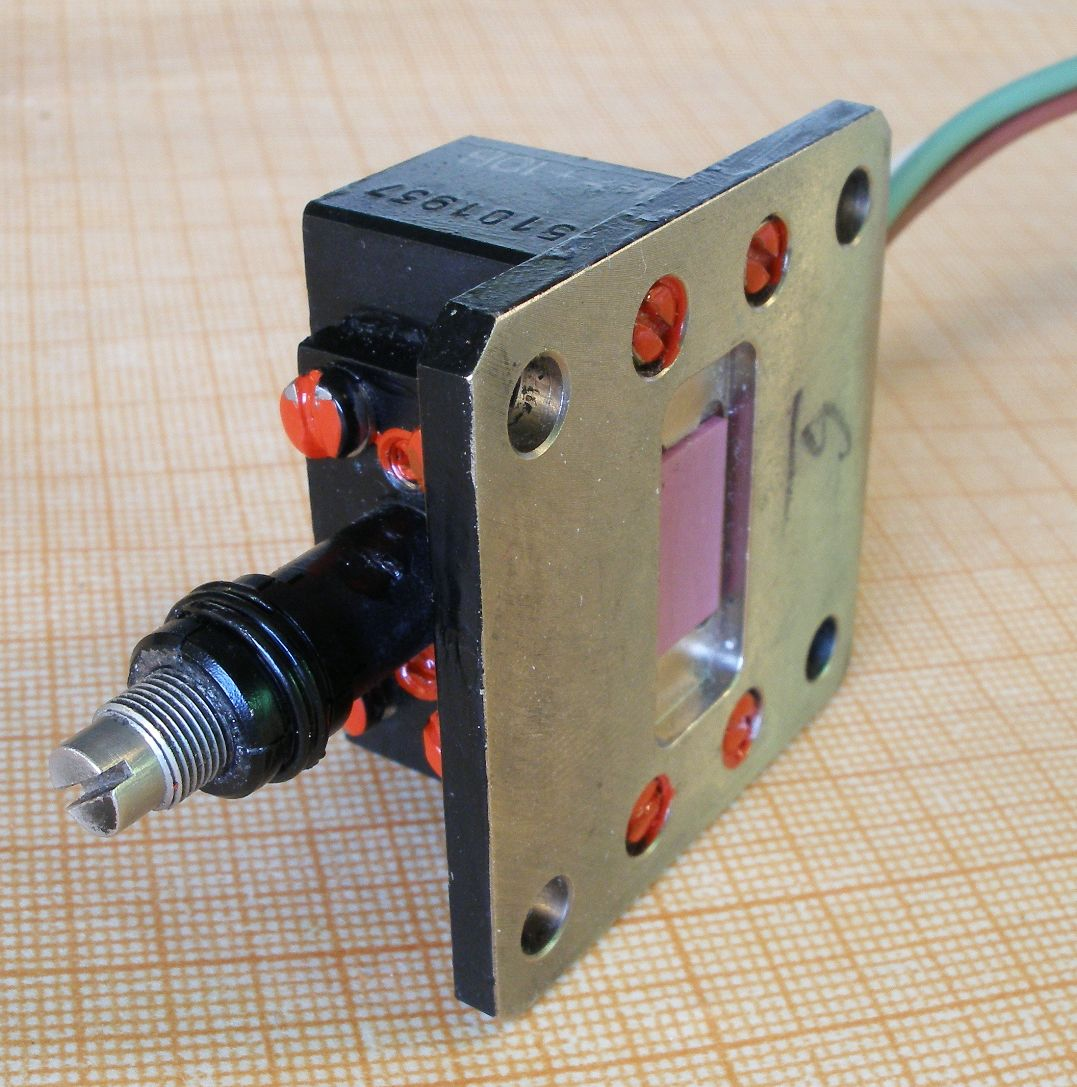
Russian Gunn diode oscillator. The diode is mounted inside the cavity (metal box), which functions as a resonator to determine the frequency. The negative resistance of the diode excites microwave oscillations in the cavity which radiate out the rectangular hole into a waveguide (not shown). The frequency can be adjusted by changing the size of the cavity using the slot head screw.

== Principle ==
The electronic band structure of some semiconductor materials, including gallium arsenide (GaAs), have another energy band or sub-band in addition to the valence and conduction bands which define a semiconductor material and which is exploited to design semiconductor devices. This third band (there could be more of them) is at higher energy than the normal conduction band and is typically empty at room temperature until energy is supplied to promote electrons to it. The energy comes from the kinetic energy of ballistic electrons, that is, electrons in the conduction band but moving with sufficient kinetic energy such that they are able to reach the higher band. The additional kinetic energy is typically provided by an electric field, applied externally to the device.

These electrons either start below the Fermi level and are given a sufficiently long mean free path to acquire the needed energy by applying a strong electric field, or they are injected by a cathode with the right energy. With forward voltage applied, the Fermi level in the cathode moves into the third band, and reflections of ballistic electrons starting around the Fermi level are minimized by matching the density of states and using the additional interface layers to let the reflected waves interfere destructively.

In GaAs, the effective mass of the electrons in the third band is higher than those in the usual conduction band, so the mobility or drift velocity of the electrons in that band is lower. As the forward voltage increases, more and more electrons can reach the higher energy band, causing them to move slower (though they have higher energies), and the current through the device decreases. This creates a region of negative differential resistance in the voltage/current relationship.

When a high enough potential is applied to the diode, the charge carrier density along the cathode becomes unstable and will develop small segments of low conductivity, with the rest of the cathode having high conductivity. Most of the cathode voltage drop will occur across the segment so that it will have a high electric field. Under the influence of this electric field, it will move along the cathode to the anode. It is impossible to balance the population in both bands, so thin slices of high-field strength will always be in a background of low-field strength. So in practice, with a slight increase in forward voltage, a low conductivity segment is created at the cathode, resistance increases, the segment moves along the bar to the anode, and when it reaches the anode, it is absorbed, and a new segment is created at the cathode to keep the total voltage constant. Any existing slice is quenched if the voltage is lowered and resistance decreases again.

In this context, ballistic electrons—those that travel with minimal scattering—play a crucial role. They can move through the semiconductor with a long mean free path, effectively gaining the necessary energy to transition to the higher energy states.

The laboratory methods used to select materials for manufacturing Gunn diodes include angle-resolved photoemission spectroscopy.

== Applications ==
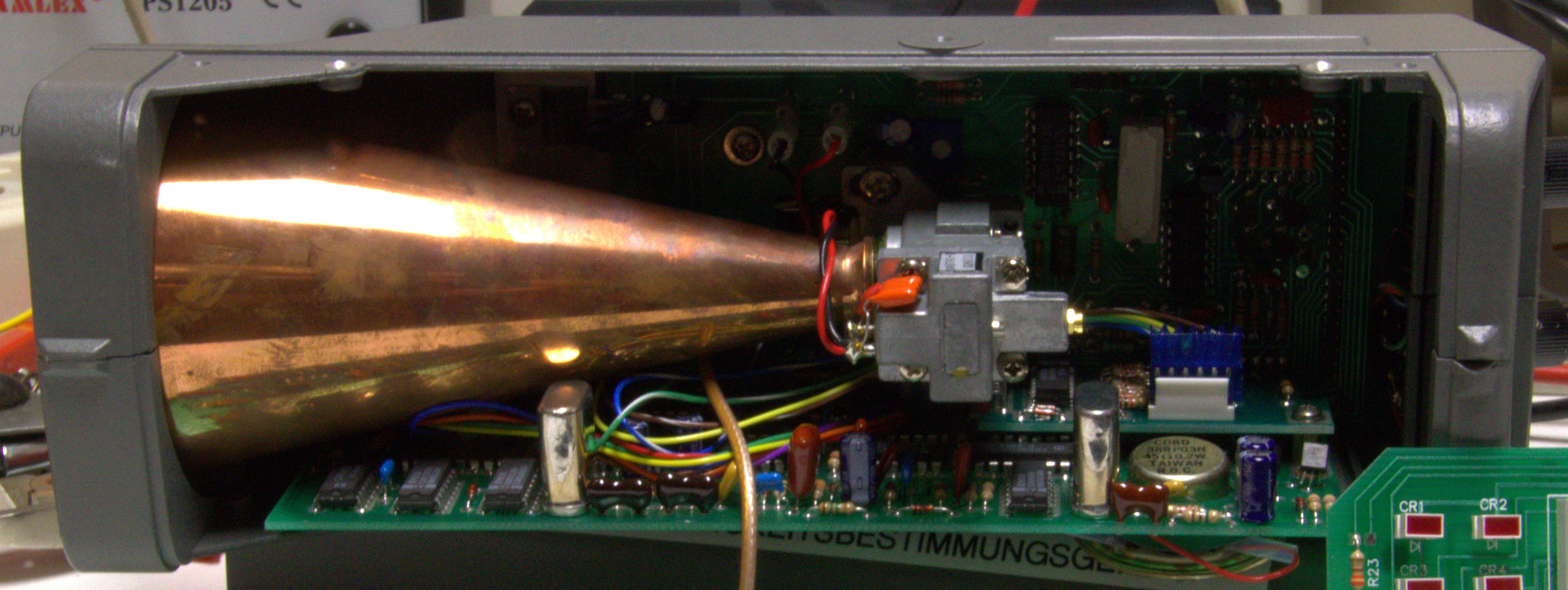
Disassembled radar speed gun. The grey assembly attached to the end of the copper-colored horn antenna is the Gunn diode oscillator which generates the microwaves.

Because of their high-frequency capability, Gunn diodes are mainly used at microwave frequencies and above. They can produce some of the highest output power of any semiconductor device at these frequencies. Their most common use is in oscillators, but they are also used in microwave amplifiers to amplify signals. Because the diode is a one-port (two terminal) device, an amplifier circuit must separate the outgoing amplified signal from the incoming input signal to prevent coupling. One common circuit is a reflection amplifier that separates the signals using a circulator. A bias tee is needed to isolate the bias current from the high-frequency oscillations.

=== Sensors and measuring instruments ===
Gunn diode oscillators generate microwave power for: airborne collision avoidance radar, anti-lock brakes, sensors for monitoring the flow of traffic, car radar detectors, pedestrian safety systems, "distance travelled" recorders, motion detectors, "slow-speed" sensors (to detect pedestrian and traffic movement up to 85 km/h (50 mph)), traffic signal controllers, automatic door openers, automatic traffic gates, process control equipment to monitor throughput, burglar alarms and equipment to detect trespassers, sensors to avoid derailment of trains, remote vibration detectors, rotational speed tachometers, moisture content monitors.

=== Radio amateur use ===
By virtue of their low voltage operation, Gunn diodes can serve as microwave frequency generators for very low-powered (few-milliwatt) microwave transceivers called Gunnplexers. British radio amateurs first used them in the late 1970s, and many Gunnplexer designs have been published in journals. They typically consist of an approximately 3 inches (7.6 centimetres) waveguide into which the diode is mounted. A low voltage (less than 12 volt) direct current power supply that can be modulated appropriately is used to drive the diode. The waveguide is blocked at one end to form a resonant cavity, and the other end usually feeds a horn antenna. An additional "mixer diode" is inserted into the waveguide, and it is often connected to a modified FM broadcast receiver to enable listening of other amateur stations. Gunnplexers are most commonly used in the 10 GHz and 24 GHz ham bands, and sometimes 22 GHz security alarms are modified as the diode(s) can be put in a slightly detuned cavity with layers of copper or aluminium foil on opposite edges for moving to the licensed amateur band. If intact, the mixer diode is reused in its existing waveguide, and these parts are well known for being extremely static sensitive. On most commercial units, this part is protected with a parallel resistor and other components, and a variant is used in some Rb atomic clocks. The mixer diode is useful for lower frequency applications even if the Gunn diode is weakened from use, and some amateur radio enthusiasts have used them in conjunction with an external oscillator or n/2 wavelength Gunn diode for satellite finding and other applications.

=== Radio astronomy ===
Gunn oscillators are used as local oscillators for millimeter-wave and submillimeter-wave radio astronomy receivers. The Gunn diode is mounted in a cavity tuned to resonate at twice the fundamental frequency of the diode. The cavity length is changed by a micrometer adjustment. Gunn oscillators capable of generating over 50 mW over a 50% tuning range (one waveguide band) are available.

The Gunn oscillator frequency is multiplied by a diode frequency multiplier for submillimeter-wave applications.
