= List of fellows of the Royal Society elected in 1994 =

Fellows of the Royal Society elected in 1994.

== Fellows ==
1. David John Aldous
2. Raymond Baker
3. Nicholas Hamilton Barton
4. Timothy Vivian Pelham Bliss
5. Richard Ewen Borcherds
6. Geoffrey Allan Boxshall
7. Jeremy Patrick Brockes
8. Anthony Edward Butterworth
9. Henry Marshall Charlton
10. Anthony Kevin Cheetham
11. Julian Edmund Davies
12. Nicholas Barry Davies
13. George Guy Dodson (1937-2012)
14. George Petros Efstathiou
15. John Edwin Field
16. Graham Richard Fleming
17. Michael John Caldwell Gordon
18. Dennis Greenland (1930-2012)
19. Kurt Lambeck
20. Brian Edward Launder
21. Andrew Gino Sita Lumsden
22. David Herman MacLennan
23. Tak Wah Mak
24. Peter McCullagh
25. Dusa McDuff
26. Robert Michael Moor
27. Sir Peter John Morris
28. John Forster Nixon
29. Andrew Clennel Palmer
30. David Godfrey Pettifor
31. Anthony James Pawson (1952–2013)
32. Brian Kidd Ridley
33. Derek Charles Robinson (1941-2002)
34. David Sherrington
35. Sir James Fraser Stoddart
36. John Tooze
37. Richard Treisman
38. Scott Duncan Tremaine
39. Robert Stephen White
40. James Gordon Williams

== Foreign members ==
1. Frank Albert Cotton (1930-2007)
2. Friedrich Ernst Peter Hirzebruch (1927–2012)
3. Isaak Markovich Khalatnikov
4. Hugh O'Neill McDevitt
5. Erwin Neher
6. Bert Sakmann
