= Ridley–Watkins–Hilsum theory =

In solid state physics the Ridley–Watkins–Hilsum theory (RWH) explains the mechanism by which differential negative resistance is developed in a bulk solid state semiconductor material when a voltage is applied to the terminals of the sample. It is the theory behind the operation of the Gunn diode as well as several other microwave semiconductor devices, which are used practically in electronic oscillators to produce microwave power. It is named for British physicists Brian Ridley, Tom Watkins and Cyril Hilsum who wrote theoretical papers on the effect in 1961.

Negative resistance oscillations in bulk semiconductors had been observed in the laboratory by J. B. Gunn in 1962, and were thus named the "Gunn effect", but physicist Herbert Kroemer pointed out in 1964 that Gunn's observations could be explained by the RWH theory.

In essence, RWH mechanism is the transfer of conduction electrons in a semiconductor from a high mobility valley to lower-mobility, higher-energy satellite valleys. This phenomenon can only be observed in materials that have such energy band structures.

Normally, in a conductor, increasing electric field causes higher charge carrier (usually electron) speeds and results in higher current consistent with Ohm's law. In a multi-valley semiconductor, though, higher energy may push the carriers into a higher energy state where they actually have higher effective mass and thus slow down. In effect, carrier velocities and current drop as the voltage is increased. While this transfer occurs, the material exhibits a decrease in current – that is, a negative differential resistance. At higher voltages, the normal increase of current with voltage relation resumes once the bulk of the carriers are kicked into the higher energy-mass valley. Therefore the negative resistance only occurs over a limited range of voltages.

Of the type of semiconducting materials satisfying these conditions, gallium arsenide (GaAs) is the most widely understood and used. However RWH mechanisms can also be observed in indium phosphide (InP), cadmium telluride (CdTe), zinc selenide (ZnSe) and indium arsenide (InAs) under hydrostatic or uniaxial pressure.

== See also ==
- Gunn diode

== Other sources ==
- Liao, Samual Y (1990). Microvave Devices and Circuits (3rd ed.). Prentice Hall. ISBN 0-13-583204-7.
- Averkov, Y.O. (2001). "The role of the Ridley–Watkins–Hilsum effect in stabilization of millimeter and sub-millimeter surface electromagnetic waves excited byan electron beam moving parallel to the surface of GaAs". The Fourth International Kharkov Symposium on Physics and Engineering of Millimeter and Sub-Millimeter Waves. Vol. 1. pp. 299–301. doi:10.1109/MSMW.2001.946832. ISBN 0-7803-6473-2. S2CID 122627167.
- Sterzer, F (1971). "Transferred electron (Gunn) amplifiers and oscillators for microwave applications". Proceedings of the IEEE. 59 (8): 1155–1163. doi:10.1109/PROC.1971.8361.
- Agamalyan, N. R.; Vartanyan, E. S.; Hovsepyan, R. K. (1996). "Photoelectric properties of lead molybdate crystals". Physica Status Solidi A. 157 (2): 421–425. Bibcode:1996PSSAR.157..421A. doi:10.1002/pssa.2211570226.
- "Phenomena/Theories – 1961". Milestones in Semiconductor Science and Technology. Archived from the original on 2009-10-22.
