= Daniel Gunn (minister) =

Daniel Gunn (1774–1848), was a Scottish congregational minister.

Gunn was born at Wick in Caithness in 1774, the son of Ingram Gunn, and his wife Elizabeth Miller (or Millar). He was educated at the high school, Edinburgh, and trained for the ministry by Greville Ewing at Glasgow. In 1800 he was sent to be an itinerant minister in Ireland, where he is known to have preached in Waterford and to have assisted J Kelly in Dublin. He may have married, and been widowed, while living in Ireland.

In 1807, as a consequence of the unrest in Ireland he moved to Ilfracombe in Devon, where he married Catherine Vye in 1808. In 1810 he became pastor of a small congregation there. He removed in 1813 to Bishop's Hull, near Taunton, and in 1814 to Chard. Catherine died there in 1815 and was buried in the graveyard beside the chapel. In 1816, he married his third wife, Elizabeth Tice, and moved to Christchurch (then Hampshire, now Dorset). His younger brother, John Gunn, replaced him as minister at Chard. John's descendants include Battiscombe Gunn and his son J. B. Gunn.

In Christchurch he found a scanty congregation, partly consisting of baptists. He promptly preached a sermon which, as he afterwards said, 'converted all the sensible baptists in the place,' and his congregation soon grew till it numbered a thousand, an extraordinary fact, considering that the whole population of Christchurch and the district within five or six miles was only about 2,500. Yet his preaching was entirely unemotional; no one was allowed to preach emotional religion in his pulpit, and the laymen whom he used to despatch into the neighbouring villages were strictly enjoined to abstain from adding anything to the printed discourses with which he provided them. His Sunday school, which was attended by upwards of four hundred children, attained a very high reputation, and attracted visitors from all parts of the country, even from America. He was almost equally successful in maintaining a day school which he established, and regulated with military precision.

Ann Taylor (poet), who met him at Ilfracombe, tells of his laboriously teaching a lad how to hand a chair; he would pitilessly call back a little boy on an unmanageable pony to make him take off his hat to Mrs. Gunn if he had omitted to do so. Yet his personal influence was extraordinary. Even in the matter of subscriptions his will was law; if the collection on Sunday was not what he considered sufficient, he would put in a five-pound note, and send the plates round again. Ann Taylor's enthusiasm for 'the noble highlander' seems to have been shared by all who met him. He was three times married, and lived like a country gentleman at Burton, near Christchurch. He died at Burton on 17 June 1848, in the seventy-fifth year of his age.

Daniel had six children: two sons by Catherine Vye (Daniel, 1811–1890, and an unnamed son born and died in 1813) and two sons and two daughters by Elizabeth Tice (Eliza, 1818–1838, Malachi, 1820–1867, William, born and died 1822, Mary, 1825–1911)
