= Mabel Frances Layng =

English painter (1881–1937)

Mabel Frances Layng (9 November 1881 – December 1937) was an English landscape and figure painter.

== Early life and education ==
Layng was born at the Grammar School House, Cumberland Street, Macclesfield, Cheshire; she was the eldest of two daughters of Alfred Edward Freestone Layng and Ada Mary Coates. Alfred Layng was widowed in 1883 and in March 1884 he took up the post of headmaster of King Edward VI School in Stafford, taking his daughters with him.

In 1902 Mabel Layng left Stafford to study at the St John's Wood Art School. She then went on to study under Frank Brangwyn at the London School of Art in Kensington between 1906 and 1908.

== Career ==
From 1914 until her death in 1937 she lived with her sister Ada in Ealing, Middlesex, earning a living as a professional artist. Her work was first exhibited at the Royal Academy of Arts in 1916 ("The Strolling Players"). Further paintings were accepted by the Royal Academy: "Mars and Venus" (1920), "The Picnic" (1921), "The Workroom" (1922) and "Crossing the Road" (1928), and her work was also exhibited during her lifetime at the Paris Salon, Glasgow Institute of the Fine Arts, Goupil Gallery, International Society, London Salon, Royal Institute of Oil Painters, Walker's Galleries in London, Women's International Art Club and the Queen Street Gallery in London.

After Layng's death, her sister organised a memorial exhibition of her oil paintings and watercolours, held at the Arlington Gallery, Old Bond Street, London in March 1938. Many of the paintings in this exhibition were purchased by, or given to, museums and galleries across the United Kingdom. As of 2017, her paintings are at Chelmsford Museum, Doncaster Museum and Art Gallery, Ferens Art Gallery in Hull, Graves Art Gallery in Sheffield, Macclesfield Museums, Newport Museum, Northampton Museum and Art Gallery, Nuneaton Museum and Art Gallery, Russell-Cotes Art Gallery & Museum in Bournemouth, Staffordshire County Museum Service, Potteries Museum & Art Gallery, The Hepworth Wakefield and Wolverhampton Art Gallery.
