= Current filament =

A current filament is an inhomogeneity in the current density distribution lateral to the direction of the current flow (that is, orthogonal to the current density vector). It is common in devices showing current-type negative differential conductivity, especially of S-type (SNDC).
