= Thomas Peploe Wood =

English painter

Thomas Peploe Wood (1 January 1817 – 4 April 1845) was an English landscape painter. A number of his pictures are at the British Museum, the Victoria and Albert Museum, Staffordshire County Museum and the William Salt Library, Stafford.

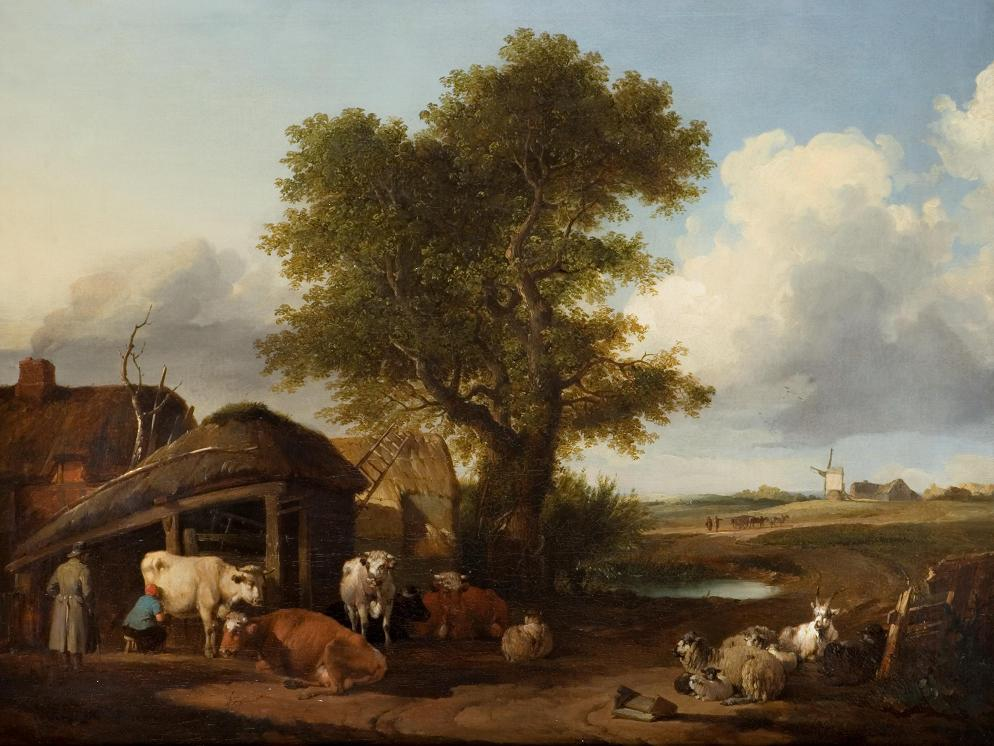
'Cattle Piece', 1843, by Thomas Peploe Wood. Staffordshire County Museum ref. G95.007.0001.

== Biography ==
Thomas Peploe Wood was born in Great Haywood, Staffordshire the son of Joseph and Alethea Wood. Joseph Wood was a toll gate keeper and shoemaker. He was largely self-taught, but was encouraged by local architect Thomas Trubshaw (1801–1842). In 1836 Trubshaw took Wood to London and introduced him to the print dealer and connoisseur, Dominic Charles Colnaghi, and the sculptor, Sir Francis Chantrey. Wood spent most of his life in his native Staffordshire, but made further visits to London in 1839, 1840 and 1843, and undertook a tour of England, Ireland and Scotland in 1838.

In 1844 Wood exhibited a painting of Manley Hall at the Royal Academy. He also exhibited one picture at the British Institution and 19 at the Birmingham Society of Arts. Wood specialised in watercolour sketches and oil paintings of landscape, buildings and animals. His chief patron was William Salt, banker and antiquary, who commissioned Wood to paint landscapes and buildings for his collections for a history of Staffordshire.

Wood suffered from ill health throughout his life, and succumbed to tuberculosis aged 28. His youngest brother was the sculptor and painter Samuel Peploe Wood (1827–1873).

A large and elaborate memorial cross to Thomas and other members of the family, carved by Samuel in 1866, still stands in the churchyard of St. Michael and All Angels Church, Colwich.
