= Ricardo Caminos =

Ricardo Augusto Caminos (c. 1916 – May 28, 1992) was an Argentine Egyptologist focused on epigraphy and paleography. Caminos was born in Buenos Aires and had a brother Hugo and sister Helena. As a child he was fascinated by ancient history, and went on to obtain a degree (1938) from the University of Buenos Aires. After studying for PhD's from both Oxford University and the University of Chicago's Oriental Institute, Chicago, he worked on number of Egyptian and Sudanese excavations, including those about to be flooded by the construction on the Aswan Dam. Around 1952 he was hired by Brown University, and in 1972 he became the chairman of the Egyptology department, retiring in 1980. He then moved to London where he conducted research at the nearby Egypt Exploration Society. His former home in London now serves as the Ricardo A. Caminos Memorial Library of the Egypt Exploration Society, and contains approximately 20,000 books, journals, and pamphlets on Egyptology.

== Works ==
- Late-Egyptian miscellanies. London: Oxford University Press. 1954.
- Literary fragments in the hieratic script. Oxford: Griffith Institute. 1956.
- The chronicle of Prince Osorkon. Rome: Pontificium Institutum Biblicum. 1958.
- Gebel es-Silsilah. London: Egypt Exploration Society. 1963. (with T. G. H. James)
- The shrines and rock-inscriptions of Ibrim. London: Egypt Exploration Society. 1968.
- The new-kingdom temples of Buhen. London: Egypt Exploration Society. 1974.
- Ancient Egyptian epigraphy and palaeography. New York: Metropolitan Museum of Art. 1976.
- A tale of woe. Oxford: Griffith Institute. 1977. ISBN 978-0-900416-09-5.
