= Samuel Peploe Wood =

English painter

Samuel Peploe Wood (17 February 1827 – 30 July 1873) was an English sculptor and painter. His sculpture can be seen on many churches and public buildings in England, and there are a number of his sketches and watercolours at Staffordshire County Museum.

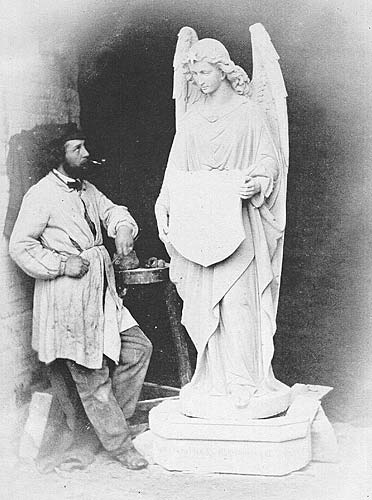
Samuel Peploe Wood in his studio, c.1860. Staffordshire County Museum ref. P81.075.0001.

== Early life and education ==
Samuel Peploe Wood was born in Great Haywood, Staffordshire on 17 February 1827, the youngest of seven children of Joseph and Alethea Wood, and younger brother of the painter Thomas Peploe Wood (1817–1845). In 1841 he was bound as an apprentice to the Trubshaws, local architects but did not complete his apprenticeship. Instead, in 1846 he went to Milan, Italy to train in the studio of the sculptor Rafaelle Monti(1818–1881). While studying in Milan, Wood joined Giuseppe Garibaldi's forces and saw some service in 1848.

== Career ==
He was back in England by 1851 and began his career as a sculptor, setting up a studio in Lichfield, Staffordshire. Wood undertook work on many Staffordshire and west Midlands buildings, including the reredos at All Angels' Church, Colwich; corbels and bosses at St. Stephen's Church, Great Haywood, an oak lectern for Stowe by Lichfield; and a crucifixion and resurrection at Ashbourne, Derbyshire. He also sculpted fireplaces at Bishton Hall, Staffordshire, the figure of Victory on Burslem Town Hall and worked on the facade of Birmingham Town Hall.

In 1866 he carved a large and elaborate memorial cross to his brother and other members of his family, still standing in the churchyard of St. Michael and All Angels Church, Colwich.

== Personal life ==
He married Amelia Illingworth at Bispham, Lancashire on 28 August 1853, and they had one child, Florence, born in Lichfield, Staffordshire in 1855. Samuel Peploe Wood died on 30 July 1873 from cancer of the tongue and was buried at Colwich, Staffordshire.

He is the grandfather of the Scottish nationalist Wendy Wood (1892–1981) and great grandfather of the musician Spike Hughes (1908–1987) and physicist J. B. Gunn (1928–2008).
