= J. B. Gunn =

British physicist

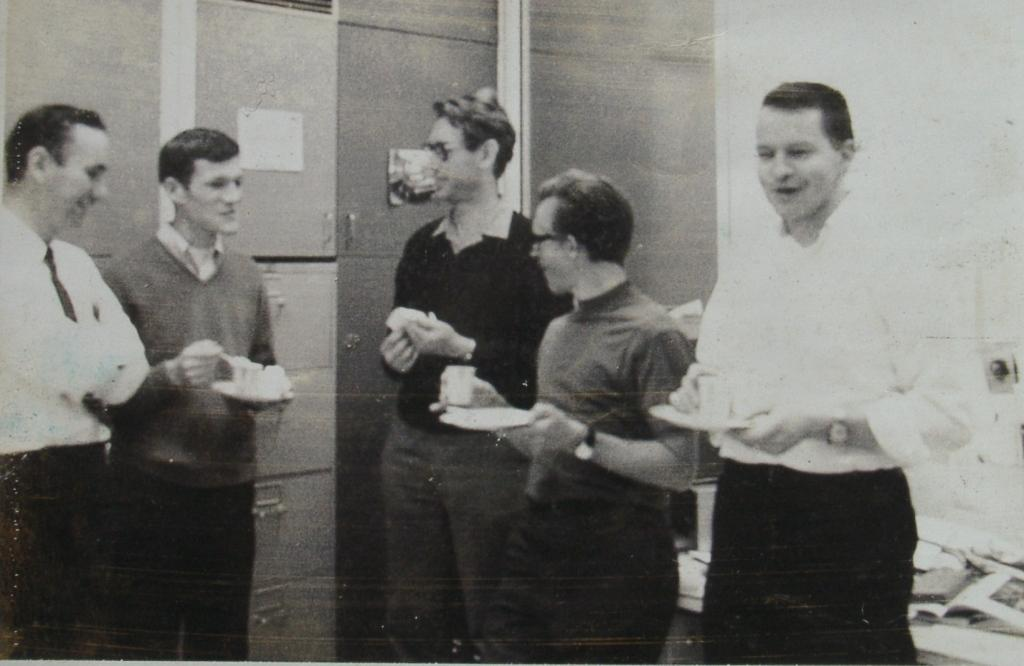
- Gunn (middle) with friends at a party, 1969.
- Born: 13 May 1928; Cairo, Egypt
- Died: 2 December 2008 (aged 80); Mount Kisco, New York, US
- Citizenship: British
- Education: Trinity College, Cambridge
- Known for: Gunn effect
- Awards: IEEE Fellow (1968); IEEE Morris N. Liebmann Memorial Award (1969); John Scott Award (1971); IBM Fellow (1971); Valdemar Poulsen Medal (1973)
- Scientific career
- Fields: Semiconductor Physics
- Workplaces: Elliott Brothers; Royal Radar Establishment; University of British Columbia; Thomas J. Watson Research Center

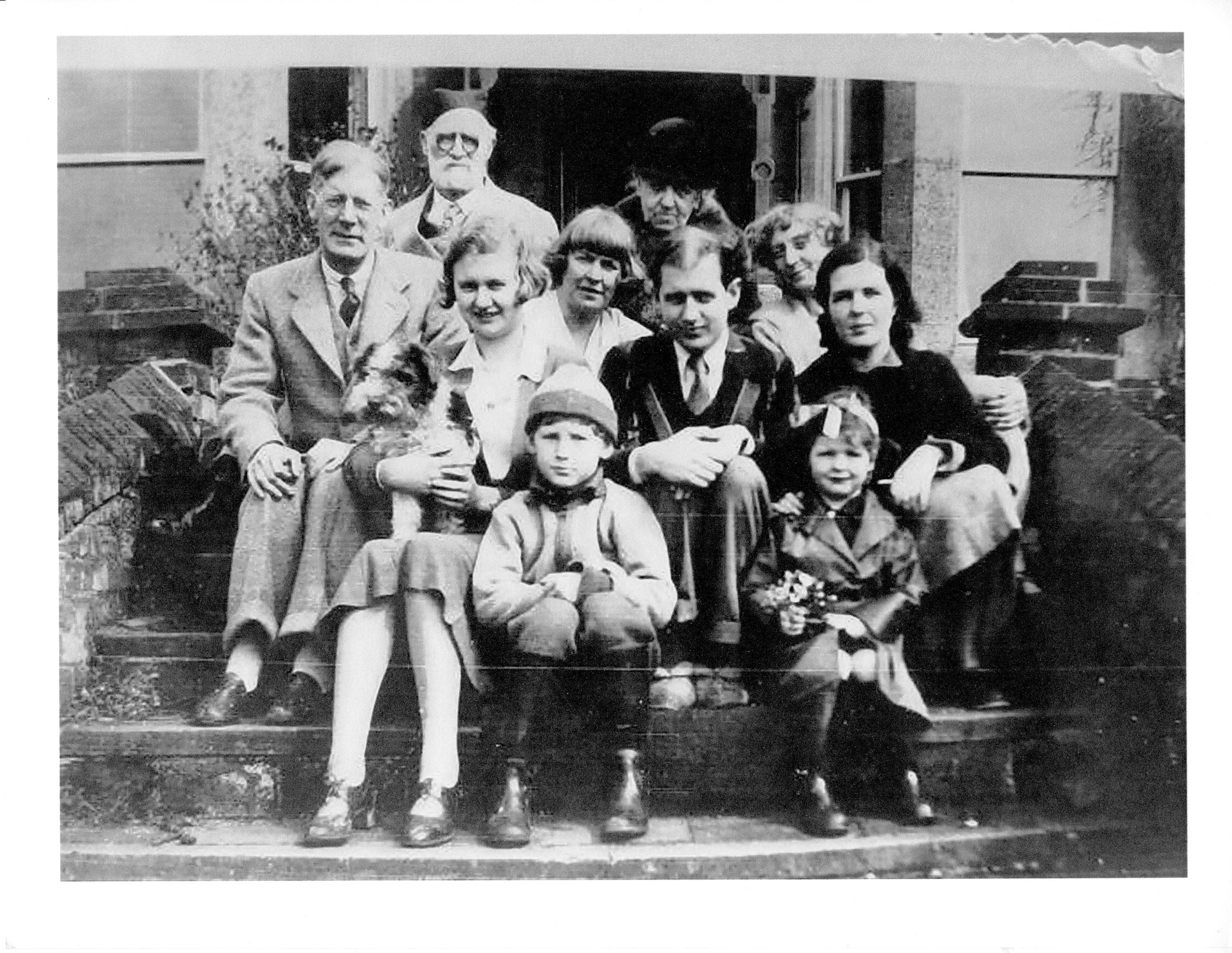
Meacham, Gunn, Hughes, Wood family picture in 1935. Back Row: Charles S. Meacham (chemist, brewer, painter), Florence Meacham (painter) - -Second Row: Battiscombe Gunn, son in law (Egyptologist), Wendy Wood, daughter (Scottish nationalist), Meena Gunn, daughter (Freudian psychoanalyst) - Third Row: Mary Barnish, granddaughter, with Meena's dog, Spike Hughes, grandson (Musician, critic), Bobbie Hughes granddaughter-in-law - Fourth (front) Row: Ian Gunn, grandson (Physicist), Angela Hughes, great-granddaughter.

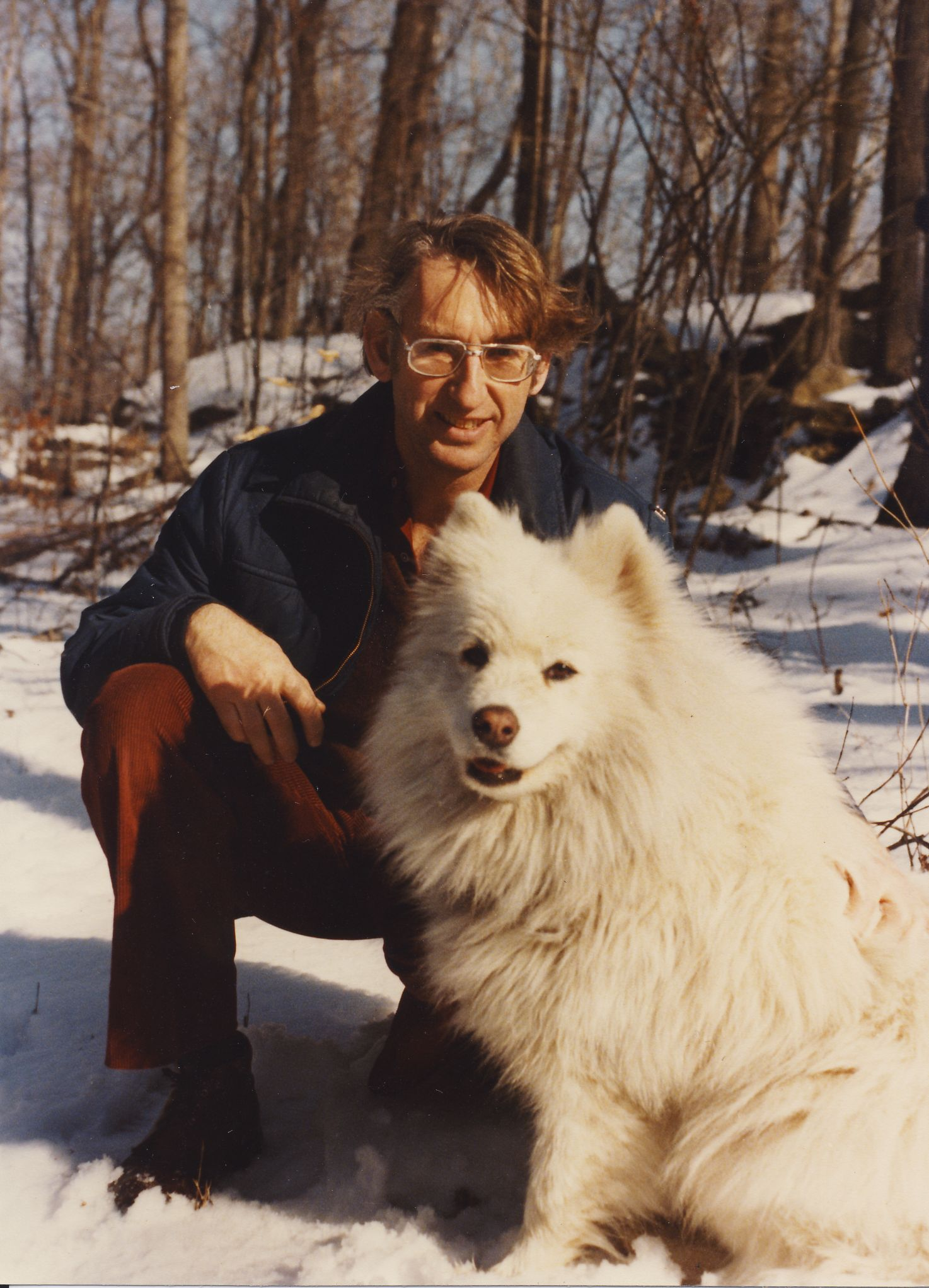
Ian Gunn with his dog Tanya. Except for his time at UBC, where they were banned from faculty housing, he always had at least one dog, usually a Samoyed.

John Battiscombe "J. B." Gunn (13 May 1928 – 2 December 2008), known as Ian or Iain, was a British physicist, who spent most of his career in the United States. He discovered the Gunn effect, which led to the invention of the Gunn diode, the first inexpensive source of microwave power that did not require vacuum tubes. He was born John Battiscombe Gunn, but only used that name in legal documents.

== Early life ==
J. B. Gunn was born in 1928 in Cairo, Egypt, to Battiscombe "Jack" Gunn, a leading Egyptologist, and Lillian Florence (Meena) Meacham Hughes Gunn, who studied psychoanalytic technique with Sigmund Freud. In 1931 the family moved to Glen Riddle, Pennsylvania, while Jack was Curator of the Egyptian Section of the museum at the University of Pennsylvania in Philadelphia. As a young boy he already showed an interest in electronics. As his older half brother Pat (Spike) Hughes, wrote of a visit to Glen Riddle in 1933: "...at 4 years and a few months, Iain was already passionately interested in seeing how things worked, and showed a typical lack of concern for what came out of a loudspeaker, so long as he could make out why it came out at all. Thus at Iain's bedtime every night the Glen Riddle radio set had to be collected up and put together again – mainly for my benefit, for I suddenly felt myself cut off from my New York roots unless I could hear my favourite radio stations." The house at Glen Riddle was later owned by Ken Iverson, an IBM colleague and one of the inventors of APL.

The Gunn family returned to England in 1934 when Jack was appointed Professor of Egyptology at the University of Oxford. It was at this point that the younger Gunn rejected the name "John". From then on, he was known personally as "Ian" or "Iain" (the Scottish form of "John"), given to him by his aunt, the Scottish nationalist Wendy Wood. He was known professionally as "J.B. Gunn". Ian was educated in England, with the exception of two years spent at Solebury School, Pennsylvania as a wartime evacuee. He was an undergraduate at Trinity College, Cambridge from 1945 to 1948. Official records show that Gunn studied Natural Sciences prelim Class II in 1946, Natural Sciences tripos Class III in 1947, Mechanical Science Class II in 1948 (in the terminology Cambridge used for its curricula) and graduated with a BA degree in 1948, but did not take an MA degree. (Note: This was somewhat unusual, as his BA degree from Cambridge made him automatically eligible for a Cambridge MA.) He described it himself as "I took two years of the natural sciences - physics, chemistry, mathematics and so on. In the last year I was able to switch to electronic engineering, which was something that was just started at Cambridge at that time."

His half-brother was the musician Pat (Spike) Hughes, who was 20 years older. Their eccentric family is described in Pat's two volumes of autobiography, Opening Bars and Second Movement. His great-grandfather was the sculptor Samuel Peploe Wood.

== Family life ==
While at Cambridge, Gunn spent a "work-study" term at the Royal Radar Establishment (RRE) in Malvern, Worcestershire, where he met Freda Pilcher (1924–1975), an Infant School teacher who was working in the RRE library. They married in London in 1950, and had three daughters, Janet, Donna, and Gillian. After Freda's death from lung cancer, he did not remarry.

== Research career ==
=== Solid state physics and electronics ===
Gunn's first full-time job was with the computer manufacturer Elliott Brothers in London. In 1953 he returned to RRE in Malvern, taking up a post as a Junior Government Research Fellow, where he worked on avalanche injection, carrier accumulation and related topics in experimental semiconductor physics.

Gunn left England for North America as part of the post-war brain drain. He first moved to Canada in 1956, to take up an Assistant Professorship at the University of British Columbia, before going to the United States in 1959 to work at IBM's Thomas J. Watson Research Center at Yorktown Heights, New York. Gunn stayed with IBM for the rest of his career, spending time on the Corporate Technology Committee, and at the San Jose research lab in California, before returning to Yorktown. He retired in 1990.

In 1962, while working for IBM, he discovered the Gunn effect based upon his refusal to accept inconsistent experimental results in Gallium arsenide as simply "noise". This led to the invention of the Gunn diode, a miniature microwave generator. While Gunn recognized the importance of the effect, he was not able to determine the underlying physical process. In December 1964, Herbert Kroemer claimed that the Gunn effect was based upon the Ridley–Watkins–Hilsum effect. Alan Chynoweth, of Bell Telephone Laboratories, showed in June 1965 that only a transferred-electron mechanism could explain the experimental results. He was nominated for the Nobel Prize in Physics in 1969.

Gunn's research papers on solid state physics and electronics relate to microwave oscillations, lattice wave amplification, the Hall effect, quantum electronics, and applications of microwave oscillations to astrophysics.

=== Research in other fields ===
Gunn stopped working on semiconductor physics in 1972, and pursued a number of different interests in his role as IBM Fellow. He spent nearly three years developing an APL computer model of a computer-controlled car, which showed that fuel consumption could be halved. This was part of a joint effort with John Cocke, who made major contributions to computer architecture, and R. A. Toupin in a study, that used computer simulation to investigate regenerative braking, a high-pressure hydraulic system to store energy, and several other topics that are now quite common practice.

He then became engrossed in APL itself, seeing it as a way to "make a tool to make a tool to do something" (just like his extensive home machine shop). His work on "self documenting code" led to early work in computer viruses. At one point he was mistakenly credited with inventing the term.

In the early 1980s, IBM was having problems with particular circuit boards failing even though they had passed their initial reliability tests. He was the first to suggest non-linear measurements to detect incipient opens, and this led to a production tool which effectively solved the problem. Later, he was involved in various task forces addressing the design and reliability of new disk drives.

His final area of technical investigation was multi-valued logic. The philosopher Patrick Grim states "J. B. Gunn has done significant work in solving various self-referential sentences in this sense. See for example his 'Notes on an Algebraic Logic of Self-Reference', unpublished. I am obliged to Gunn for extensive and very helpful correspondence. PG" However, IBM was less interested in this area, and he retired from IBM in 1990.

Even after retirement, he continued to apply his problem solving approach to his motorcycle racing: "The world is not full of unfathomable mysteries that you can only solve with luck. If you really want to understand why something is happening, you can probably attack it in a scientific way and find out what is going on."

== Awards and honours ==
He was a member of the National Academy of Engineering and the American Academy of Arts and Sciences, and received the 1969 IEEE Morris N. Liebmann Memorial Award, the Valdemar Poulsen Medal of the Royal Danish Academy of Sciences and Letters, and the John Scott Award. He was named an IEEE Fellow in 1968 and IBM Fellow in 1971.

== Motorcycle racing ==
Ian Gunn's motorcycle racing career spanned 50 years, from 1950 to 2000, in the UK and US, during which time he raced with such greats as Geoff Duke, Phil Read, Mike Hailwood, Eddie Lawson, Colin Edwards, and Scott Russell. His career included two Grand Prix, but mostly he raced in the "club races".

He started riding motorcycles at Cambridge in 1945, and started racing in 1950. He married Freda Pilcher (1924–1975) on the Saturday of August Bank holiday, raced his International Norton at Blandford, Dorset, on the Monday, before continuing on to their honeymoon. By 1951 it had evolved to a Manx/Inter hybrid, which he raced at one of the few motorcycle races at Goodwood, and then in the 1951 Isle of Man Senior TT, finishing 37th out of 80 starters.

He put motorcycle racing aside while at RRE, but continued to ride on the street. Before leaving for Canada in 1956 he sold all his motorcycles, including a 1928 CS1 Norton, named "Father William" after Lewis Carroll's You Are Old, Father William for its reliability in spite of its age. He had no bikes while at UBC, but bought a Ducati 200 shortly after moving to IBM, and started racing with Association of American Motorcycle Road Racers (AAMRR). Initially his race transport was a VW Beetle with the passenger and rear seats removed. In 1964 it was replaced by a VW bus, and the 200 was replaced by a Ducati Mach 1S 250. On that bike he won his first race, at one of the few motorcycle races at Watkins Glen. He also raced it in the FIM 1965 US Grand Prix at Daytona. He qualified in the front half of the field, and ran as high as 10th, but retired with a minor mechanical failure.

By 1967, it was clear that 2-strokes were dominating the sport, so he bought a Kawasaki A1R (250cc), which he raced through the end of the decade. From 1971 to 1976 he took a break from motorcycling. In the first part of this break he acquired a vintage Ferrari 375MM, which he raced in vintage races, including one at Watkins Glen. In 1974 and 1975 he tended to his wife, who died in August 1975.

By 1976, road racing had adopted the "formula" structure, which allowed 2-strokes and 4-strokes to compete on a more even basis. He acquired a Ducati 750 SS which he raced successfully through 1990. In 1991 he bought a 1990 Ducati 888 SP2. With its electronic ignition and electronic fuel injection, this brought his professional expertise to the race track. He was one of the first privateers with his own chip writer. In parallel with racing modern bikes, he also raced vintage bikes, mostly English and Italian bikes from the 1950s and 1960s. He raced both new and old bikes through 2000, saying "I’ll keep at it as long as it is fun".

Regretting the bikes he sold when he left England, and determined not to make the same mistake again, he kept all but two of the bikes he bought in the US, and bought back "Father William" in 1993, ending up with 40 motorcycles, which he kept in a milking parlour and hay barn attached to the house.

Gunn also owned a few classic cars, including a 1930 supercharged 1750 SS Alfa, originally raced at Brooklands by George Eyston and a 1971 Datsun 240Z. In April 1972, Gunn paid $10,000 for Ferrari 375 MM chassis No. s/n 0382 AM, the ninth and last of the 1953 4.5litre V12 spyder series cars built for racing in 1954. Built originally for American semi-professional racer Bill Spear, after competing in SCAA events in the hands of various owner/drivers, Gunn competed in the car for the 1972 and 1973 events, before retiring the by then non-working car to his collection. After Gunn's death in 2008, his three daughters sold the car to noted Ferrari collector Andreas Mohringer of Austria. After refurbishment and then display at the Pebble Beach concourse event, it was shipped back to Paul Russell's shop in New England.
