= Warren Royal Dawson =

Warren Royal Dawson OBE FRSE FRSM FZS FSA FLS FRSL (13 October 1888, Ealing – 5 May 1968, Bletchley) was an English librarian, insurance agent, Egyptologist and antiquarian.

== Biography ==
He was born in Ealing in west London on 13 October 1888.

He was educated at St Paul's School, attending the school between 1900 and 1905, but was forced to abandon his education on the death of his father in 1903. He entered the insurance business, establishing his own underwriting agency in 1922; a partnership in 1929 allowed him leisure to pursue his scholarly interests. He had married Alys Helen Wood in 1912. Ill-health prompted retirement in 1936 to live in Simpson, a village near Bletchley, Buckinghamshire.

Encouraged by Wallis Budge at the British Museum, Dawson began serious amateur study of Egyptian hieroglyphs in 1914. A lifelong interest in Egyptian mummification began with collaboration with the anatomist Grafton Elliot Smith. Dawson's study of ancient medicine resulted in Magician and Leech, and many later articles. Though Dawson never himself travelled to Egypt, "he talked of it as if he had known it well. Much of his knowledge of the land he had acquired directly from the best guides – the great Egyptologists of the last generation, Budge, Griffith, Gardiner, Petrie, Newberry, Gunn.". He published biographical accounts of Thomas Pettigrew (1931), Charles Wycliffe Goodwin (1934) and Grafton Elliot Smith (1938), as well as Who was who in Egyptology (1951), a 'biographical index' to Egyptologists.

Dawson also catalogued the manuscripts of the Medical Society of London (1932), the Linnean Society (1936), and the Huxley Papers in the Imperial College of Science (1946); he calendared the correspondence of Joseph Banks for the British Museum (1958).

He was honorary librarian to Lloyd's of London 1927 to 1936. He was elected a Fellow of the Royal Society of Edinburgh in 1928. His proposers were Robert Ludwig Mond, James Ritchie, Lewis William Gunther Malcolm, and William Fraser Hume.

== Family ==
He was married to Alys Helen Wood in 1912.

== Works ==
- (with Grafton Elliot Smith) Egyptian mummies, 1924
- Mummy as a Drug, 1927
- Bibliography of Works relating to Mummification in Egypt, 1928
- Magician and leech: a study in the beginnings of medicine with special reference to ancient Egypt, 1929
- The custom of couvade, 1929
- The beginnings, Egypt and Assyria, 1930
- The bridle of Pegasus; studies in magic, mythology and folklore, 1930
- Who Was Who in Egyptology, First edition, 1951.
