= Thomas Anson =

Thomas Anson may refer to:

- Thomas Anson (politician, died 1773) (c. 1695–1773), MP for Lichfield
- Thomas Anson, 1st Viscount Anson (1767–1818), British politician, great-nephew of the above
- Thomas Anson, 1st Earl of Lichfield (1795–1854), British Whig politician, son of the above
- Thomas Anson (cricketer) (1818–1899), English cricketer, nephew of the above
- Thomas Anson, 2nd Earl of Lichfield (1825–1892), British politician, son of the 1st Earl
- Thomas Anson, 3rd Earl of Lichfield (1856–1918), British peer and landowner
- Thomas Anson, 4th Earl of Lichfield (1883–1960), British peer, soldier and landowner
