= Thomas Anson, 3rd Earl of Lichfield =

British peer

The Right Honourable The Earl of Lichfield JP DL
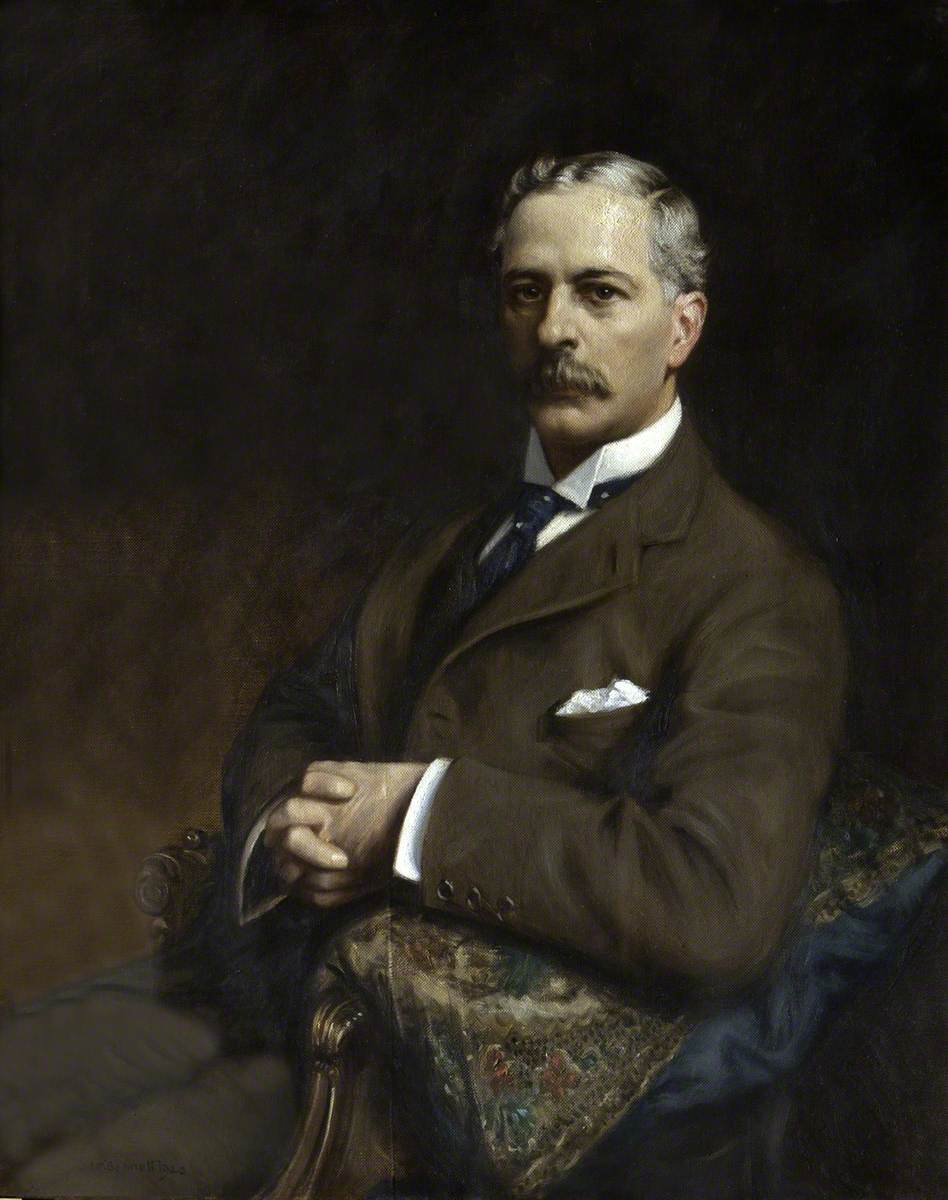
- Posthumous portrait by Frank Moss Bennett, 1920
- Born: Thomas Francis Anson, Viscount Anson; 31 January 1856; Westminster, London, England
- Died: 29 July 1918 (aged 62); Great Haywood, Staffordshire, England
- Burial place: St Stephen's Church, Great Haywood
- Education: Harrow School
- Alma mater: Trinity College, Cambridge
- Spouse: Lady Mildred Coke (m. 1878)
- Children: Lady Bertha Egerton; Mabel Forbes, Lady Forbes; Thomas Anson, 4th Earl of Lichfield; Lady Violet Gregson; Arthur Anson; Rupert Anson
- Parents: Thomas Anson, 2nd Earl of Lichfield (father); Lady Harriett Hamilton (mother)
- Family: Anson family

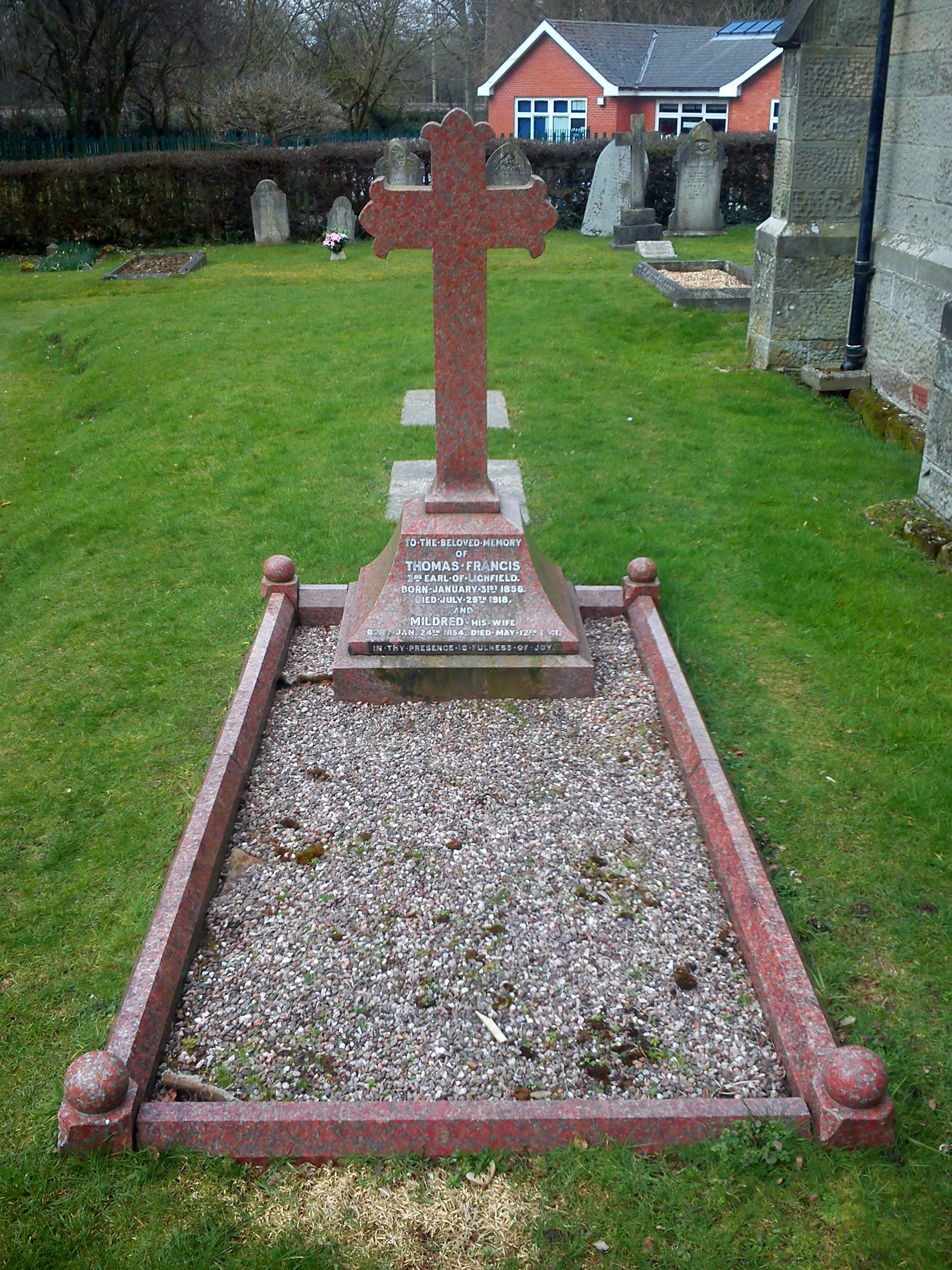
Lichfield's grave at St Stephen's Church, Great Haywood

Thomas Francis Anson, 3rd Earl of Lichfield (31 January 1856 – 29 July 1918), styled Viscount Anson until 1892, was a British peer and landowner.

== Biography ==
Born on 31 January 1856, Lichfield was the eldest son of Thomas Anson, 2nd Earl of Lichfield, and Lady Harriett Hamilton (1834–1913), eldest daughter of James Hamilton, 1st Duke of Abercorn. Educated at Harrow School, Lichfield subsequently attended Trinity College, Cambridge, where he graduated with a Bachelor of Arts degree in 1876.

On 5 November 1878, Lichfield married his first half-cousin twice removed, Lady Mildred Coke (1854–1941), daughter of Thomas Coke, 2nd Earl of Leicester. They had six children:

- Lady Bertha Anson (1879–1959), who married the Hon. Thomas Henry Frederick Egerton (1876–1953), son of Francis Egerton, 3rd Earl of Ellesmere; they had issue, including Mildred Helen Egerton (1903–1930), who married Dominick Browne, 4th Baron Oranmore and Browne.
- Lady Mabel Anson (1882–1972), who married Atholl Forbes, 21st Lord Forbes (1882–1953); they had issue, including Nigel Forbes, 22nd Lord Forbes.
- Thomas Edward Anson, 4th Earl of Lichfield (1883–1960), who married Evelyn Maud Keppel (1887–1945); they had issue.
- Lady Violet Anson (1886–1974), who married Colonel Lancelot Mare Gregson (died 1935); they had issue.
- The Hon. Arthur Augustus Anson (1887–1960)
- Major The Hon. Rupert Anson (1889–1966), a major in the King's Royal Rifle Corps.

Styled Viscount Anson before succeeding to the earldom, he contested the Lichfield constituency as a Liberal Unionist Party candidate in the 1886 United Kingdom general election, but was unsuccessful, losing to Sir John Swinburne, 7th Baronet.

Upon the death of his father on 7 January 1892, he succeeded to the titles of 3rd Earl of Lichfield, 4th Viscount Anson, and 4th Baron Soberton. The family seat was Shugborough Hall near Great Haywood, Staffordshire. He was active in banking and business affairs, serving as a director of the National Provincial Bank and the Bank of Australasia, and deputy governor of the Hudson's Bay Company. He also served as president of the Marylebone Cricket Club. He was a justice of the peace and deputy lieutenant of Staffordshire.

Lichfield died of a gunshot wound on 29 July 1918 while duck shooting on his Shugborough Hall estate. An inquest ruled the death to be accidental. He was buried in the churchyard of St Stephen's Church, Great Haywood.

Peerage of the United Kingdom
Preceded by Thomas George Anson	Earl of Lichfield; 1892–1918	Succeeded by Thomas Edward Anson
