= Thomas Anson, 2nd Earl of Lichfield =

British politician

The Right Honourable The Earl of Lichfield

Lord-Lieutenant of Staffordshire
- In office 1863–1871
- Preceded by: The Lord Hatherton
- Succeeded by: The Lord Wrottesley

Member of Parliament for Lichfield
- In office 1847–1854 Serving with Lord Alfred Paget
- Preceded by: Lord Alfred Paget; Edward Lloyd-Mostyn
- Succeeded by: Lord Alfred Paget; The Lord Waterpark

Personal details
- Born: 15 August 1825
- Died: 7 January 1892 (aged 66)
- Spouse: Lady Harriett Georgiana Louisa Hamilton (m. 1855)
- Children: 13; including Thomas Anson, 3rd Earl of Lichfield
- Parent(s): Thomas Anson, 1st Earl of Lichfield; Louisa Catherine Philips
- Relatives: George Anson (uncle)
- Education: Eton College

Thomas George Anson, 2nd Earl of Lichfield (15 August 1825 – 7 January 1892), known as Viscount Anson from 1831 to 1854, was a British politician from the Anson family.

== Early life ==
Arms of the Anson family, Earls of Lichfield.

Lichfield was the eldest of four sons and four daughters born to Thomas Anson, 1st Earl of Lichfield, and his wife Louisa Catherine (née Philips). Among his siblings was Augustus Anson, a soldier who received the Victoria Cross, and Adelbert John Robert Anson, a clergyman who served as Bishop of Qu'Apelle in Canada.

His paternal grandparents were Thomas Anson, 1st Viscount Anson, and his wife Anne Margaret, daughter of Thomas Coke, 1st Earl of Leicester. His paternal uncle was Major-General the Hon. George Anson. His maternal grandfather was Nathaniel Philips.

He was educated at Eton College, in Windsor, England.

== Career ==
On 16 November 1844, aged 19, he was commissioned as the Captain of the Lichfield Troop of the part-time Staffordshire Yeomanry, commanded by his father. He remained with the regiment into the early 1860s.

Between 1846 and 1847, Viscount Anson was with the Foreign Office. He was returned to Parliament for Lichfield in 1847, a seat he held until 1854, when he succeeded his father in the earldom and took his seat in the House of Lords. He also succeeded as the 3rd Baron Soberton and the 4th Viscount Anson.

From 1863 to 1871, he also served as Lord-Lieutenant of Staffordshire.

His seat was Shugborough Hall. In 1876, his Staffordshire estates amounted to 21,433 acres.

== Personal life ==
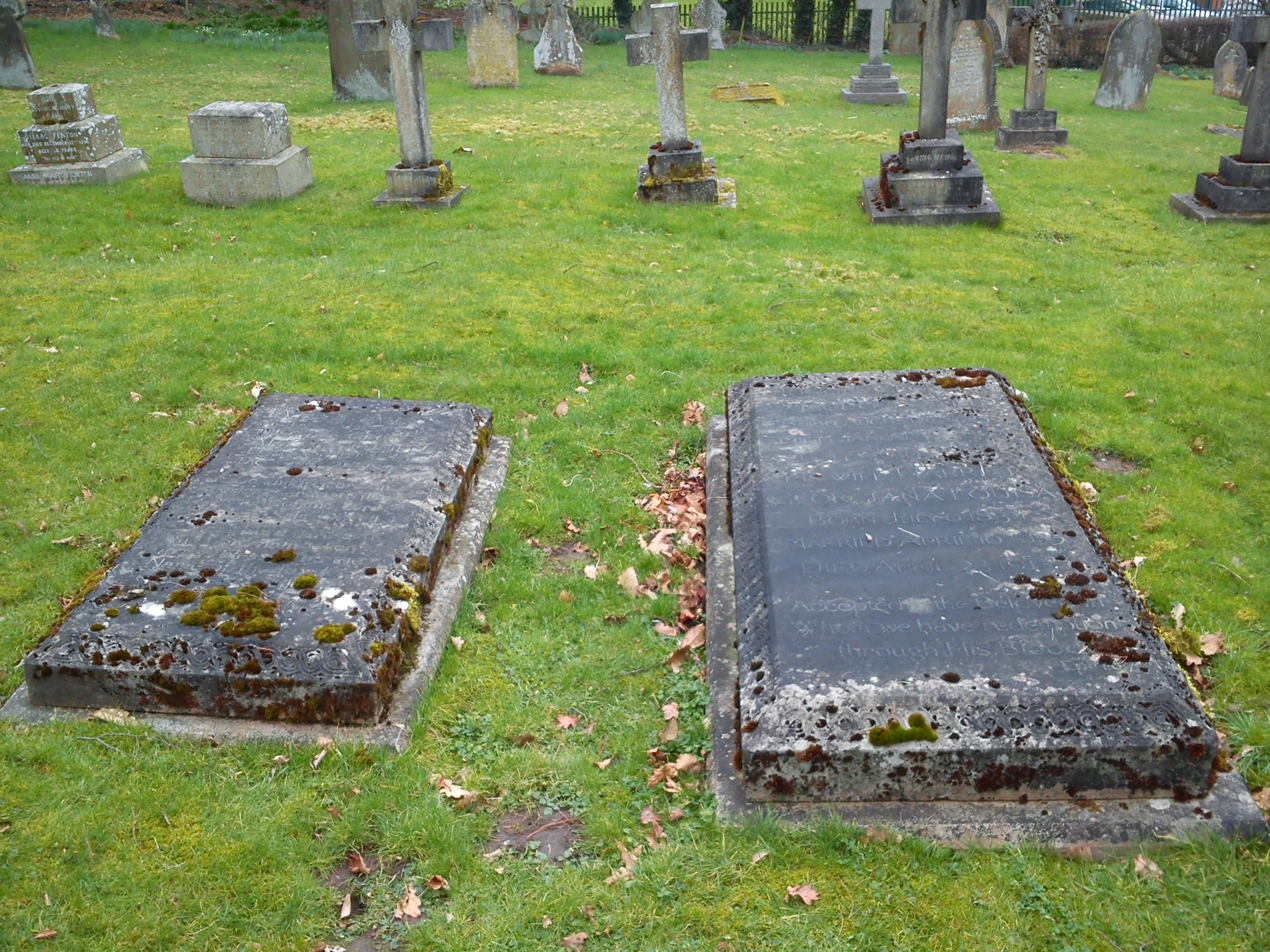
Graves of the 2nd Earl of Lichfield and his wife (right) and one of their daughters (left) at St Stephen's Church churchyard, Great Haywood

On 10 April 1855, Lord Lichfield married Lady Harriett Georgiana Louisa, daughter of James Hamilton, 1st Duke of Abercorn, and Louisa Hamilton, Duchess of Abercorn (the eldest daughter of John Russell, 6th Duke of Bedford, by his second wife, Lady Georgiana Gordon, and the sister of Prime Minister John Russell, 1st Earl Russell). Together, they were the parents of nine sons and four daughters:

- Thomas Francis Anson, 3rd Earl of Lichfield (1856–1918), who married his cousin, Lady Mildred Coke, daughter of Thomas Coke, 2nd Earl of Leicester.
- Hon. Sir George Augustus Anson (1857–1947), who married Blanche Mary Miller in 1884.
- Major Hon. Henry James Anson (1858–1904), who married Lady Adelaide Audrey Ryder, daughter of Henry Ryder, 4th Earl of Harrowby, in 1902.
- Lady Florence Beatrice Anson (1860–1946), who married Colonel Sir Henry Streatfeild (grandson of Henrietta Mildred Hodgson) in 1885.
- Hon. Frederic William Anson (1862–1917), who married Florence Louisa Jane Lane (sister of Lilian Bromley-Davenport), in 1886.
- Hon. Claud Anson (1864–1947), who married Lady Clodagh Beresford, daughter of John Beresford, 5th Marquess of Waterford, in 1901.
- Lady Beatrice Anson (1865–1919), who married Lt.-Col. Richard Hamilton Rawson in 1890.
- Hon. Francis Anson (1867–1928), who married Caroline Cleveland, daughter of George Cleveland, a sheep rancher of Texas, United States, in 1892.
- Lady Mary Maud Anson (1869–1961), who married Hon. Edward Alan Dudley Ryder, son of Henry Ryder, 4th Earl of Harrowby, in 1893.
- Lady Edith Anson (1870–1932), who married Lionel King, 3rd Earl of Lovelace in 1895.
- Hon. William Anson (1872–1926), who was educated at Monkton Combe School, emigrated to Texas in 1890 and became a rancher. He was naturalised in 1902 and married actress Louisa van Wagenen in 1917. He died in 1926.
- Lady Evelyn Anson (1873–1895), who did not marry.
- Hon. Alfred Anson (1876–1944), who in 1912 married Lela (née Alexander) Emery, the mother of John J. Emery and Audrey, Princess Romanovskaya-Ilyinskaya. He was educated at Monkton Combe School and Harrow.

Lord Lichfield died in January 1892, aged 66, and was buried at St Stephen's Church in Great Haywood. He was succeeded as Earl of Lichfield by his eldest son Thomas. Lady Lichfield died in 1913.

== Notes ==
Parliament of the United Kingdom
Preceded by Lord Alfred Paget; Edward Lloyd-Mostyn	Member of Parliament for Lichfield; 1847–1854; With: Lord Alfred Paget	Succeeded by Lord Alfred Paget; The Lord Waterpark
Honorary titles
Preceded by The Lord Hatherton	Lord-Lieutenant of Staffordshire; 1863–1871	Succeeded by The Lord Wrottesley
Peerage of the United Kingdom
Preceded by Thomas William Anson	Earl of Lichfield; 1854–1892	Succeeded by Thomas Francis Anson
