= Shugborough Tunnel =

Coordinates: 52.7920°N 2.0292°W

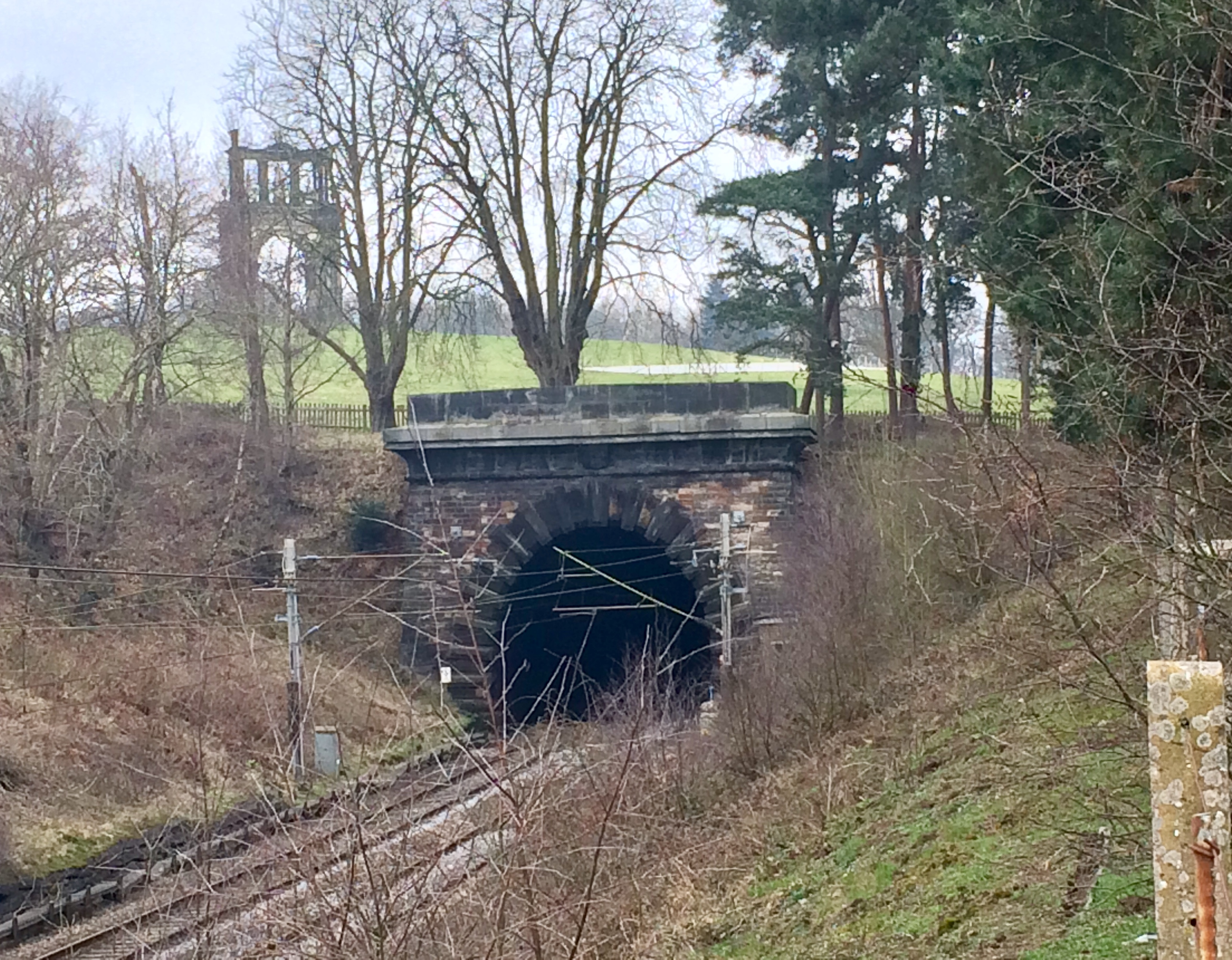
- Eastern tunnel portal
- Interactive map of Shugborough Tunnel

Overview
- Line: Trent Valley Line
- Location: Shugborough Estate, Colwich, Staffordshire, England
- System: National Rail

Operation
- Work began: 1845
- Opened: 1846
- Owner: Network Rail

Technical
- Design engineer: Joseph Locke & John Livock
- Length: 777 yards (710 m)
- No. of tracks: double track
- Track gauge: Standard gauge
- Electrified: 25 kV AC OHLE
- Operating speed: 100 miles per hour (160 km/h)

Listed Building – Grade II
- Designated: 17 March 1953
- Reference no.: 1065770

The Shugborough Tunnel is a 777-yard (710 m) railway tunnel on the Trent Valley line running under part of the Shugborough Estate in Colwich, Staffordshire, England. It was constructed in 1846 by the Trent Valley Railway (later the London and North Western Railway) and is located between Stafford station and Colwich Junction. Both portals, which were designed by John Livock, are grade II listed.

The tunnel was built to hide the line at the insistence of Thomas Anson, 1st Earl of Lichfield, the landowner of the Shugborough Estate through which it passes, after negotiations with the railway company with options for diversion were also discussed. Shugborough Tunnel is the largest engineering work on the line.

== Description ==
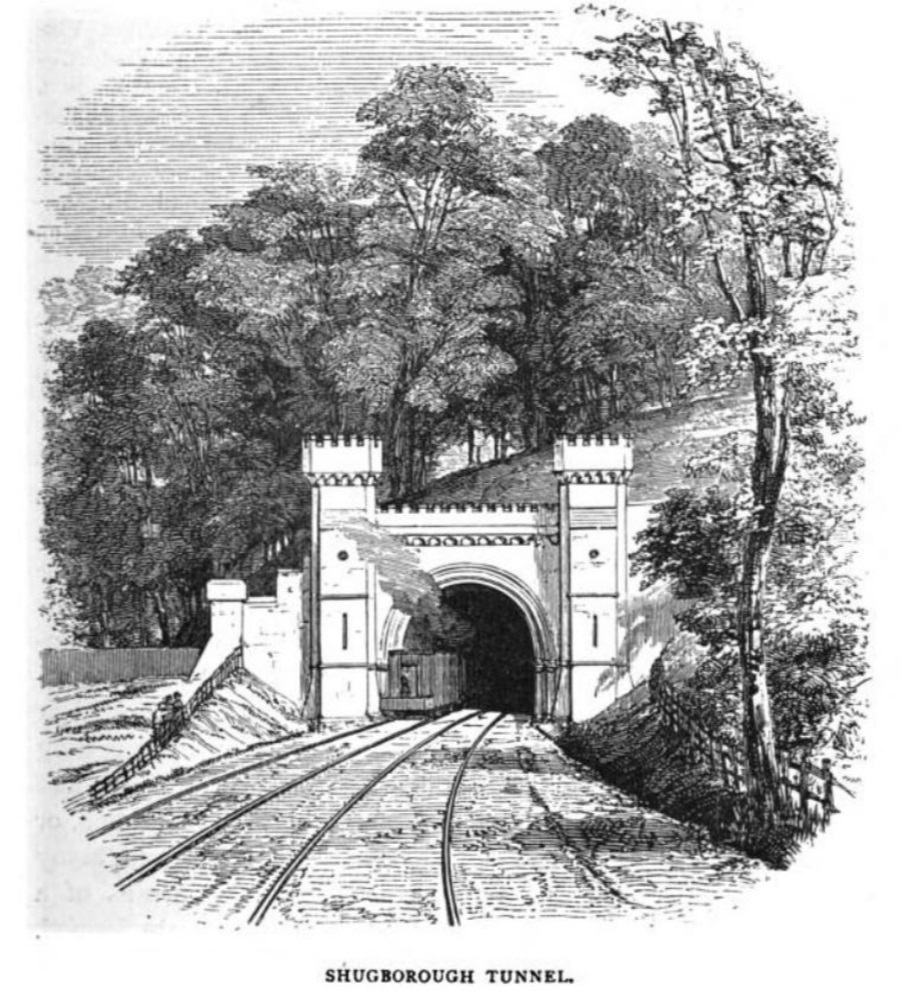
Shugborough Tunnel's west portal from The Illustrated London News, 1847

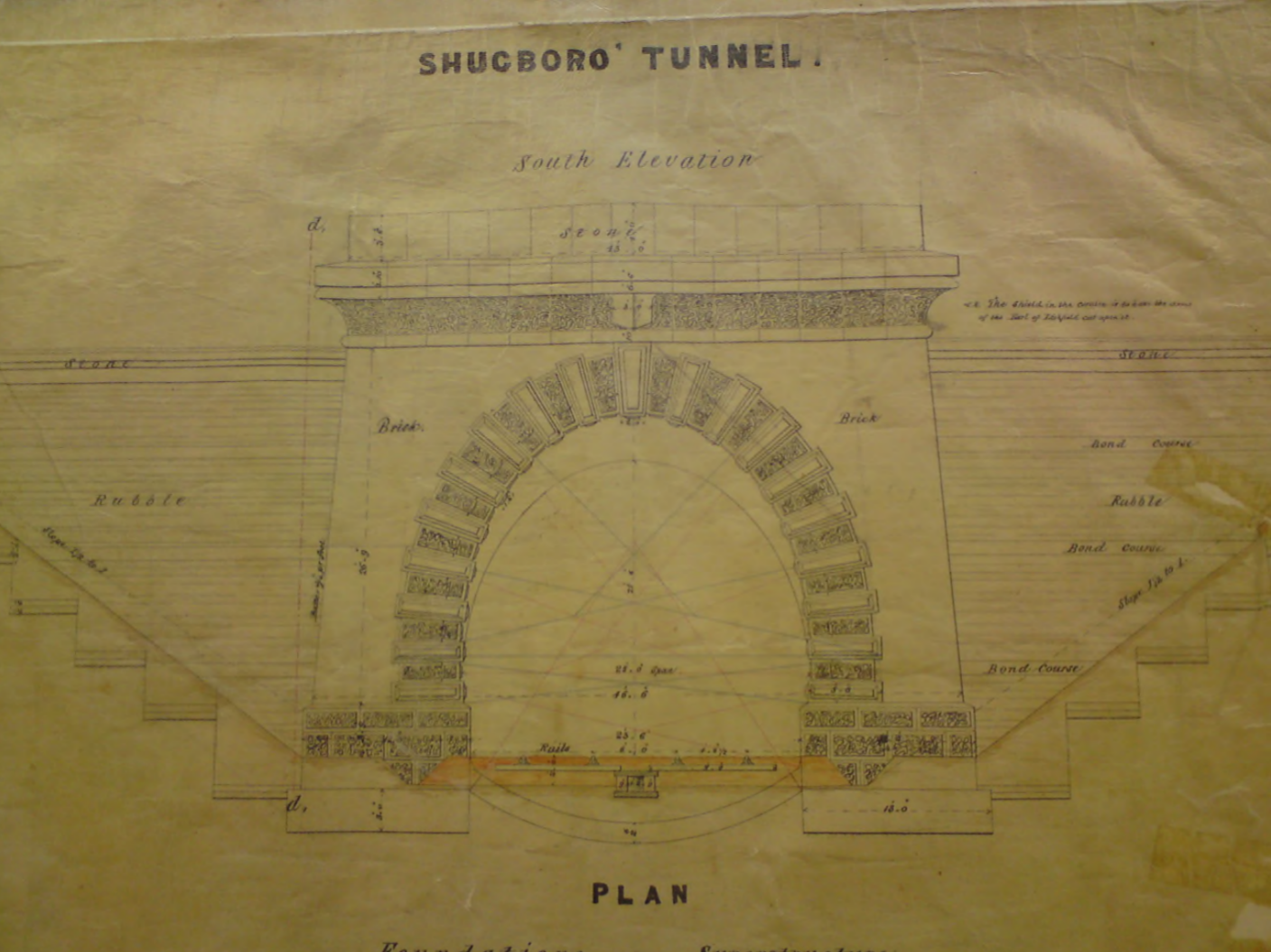
Pre-construction plan of the eastern tunnel portal

Shugborough Tunnel is 777 yards (710 m) long, a brick-lined semi-circular arch and carries a double line of railway under a flank of the Satnall Hills through the grounds of Shugborough Hall. Though driven through conglomerate rock, a hard sandstone, it is built on a curve and contains no ventilation shafts. The shafts were filled in on completion of the excavations as any structure or spoil hill would have disturbed the delicate classically landscaped hillside overhead.

The two portals of the tunnel, which are highly ornamental, each take a different style, though both are of stone and designed by John Livock. The 19th century railway produced architecture distinct from the styles of the monuments in Shugborough Park, which reflected 18th century taste, but which complemented the setting. The eastern portal, which lies within the park, has influences from Classical and Egyptian architecture, and has a decorated overhang below its cornice, which has a shield carved with the arms of the Earl of Lichfield in its centre, and a stone parapet above. The archway stands on a base of vermiculated courses and is surrounded by alternating chamfered and vermiculated bands, as well as flanking walls of rubble masonry, now hidden by vegetation.

The western portal has a much different castellated Romanesque architectural style; a deeply moulded arch supported on jamb-shafts and cushion capitals, with a face dressed in finely coursed stone. A buttressing tower flanks each side, each with an arrow slit and a round window. The left wing wall resembles a castle wall, ending in a turret; the wall on the right is stepped up the hillside in stages above the level of the portal face.

The western portal was featured in The Illustrated London News at its opening in 1846, accompanied by a woodcut (left). A description of the portal said "a very striking architectural composition...a noble archway deeply moulded, flanked by two square towers, the whole surmounted by a battlemented parapet resting on arched corbel tables. The lofty trees clothed with the richest foliage rising from the elevated ground through which the tunnel is pierced, give a depth of tone, and artistic effect to the whole scene, at once peculiarly imposing and beautiful, and form a remarkably fine feature in the scenery of the railway."

Original watercolour draft plans of the tunnel's portals survive in the Staffordshire Record Office. So impressive were the portals that they became known as the "Gates of Jerusalem".

== History ==
The Trent Valley Railway (TVR) was created in 1844 as an independent company (though it consolidated with others in 1846 to form the London and North Western Railway while still under construction) to provide a mail route direct from London to Ireland, bypassing Birmingham and avoiding the need to transfer mail and passengers there. This required it to pass through the estate of Shugborough Hall in Colwich, Staffordshire, possibly making its owner, the Earl of Lichfield, one of the earliest landowners approached by a railway seeking to cross his estate, which contains a spur of low hills. The Anson family, to which he belonged, was sufficiently powerful to have previously had the ancient road from Lichfield to Stafford diverted so as not to divide the landscaped grounds of the 16th century manor house on Shugborough estate.

Alternative routes considered through Shugborough Park

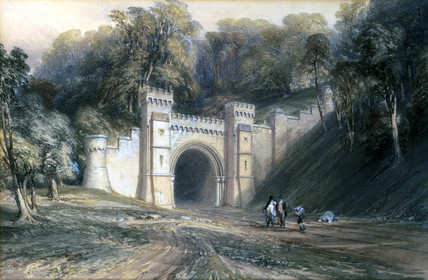
1846 watercolour of the castellated west portal

However, Lord Lichfield was not living on the estate at the time the TVR was looking to expand through the estate. His brother, Colonel George Anson, had taken residence in the house and was more sympathetic to the expanding railway than many landowners would have been, though the Earl, whose representatives negotiated with the TVR, resisted the railway from a distance, and insisted that the railway should be hidden in a tunnel or diverted away from Shugborough. The Trent Valley Railway's chief engineer, Joseph Locke, needed to balance the concerns of landowners and the railway, particularly economically, and would always choose not to build costly tunnels if it could be avoided. In trying to lay out a line with minimum interference with private properties, Locke proposed three routes for the TVR at Shugborough: to the south through the Marquess of Anglesey's Haywood Park, to the north past the Tixall estate of Lord Talbot, or the most direct route through Shugborough Park, via a tunnel to conceal the line running only 0.75 miles (1.21 km) from the house. Taking a diversion via either of the first two options would cost more and increase train travelling time, reducing the advantage over the line via Birmingham.

During 1844, a negotiation between the TVR and the Earl of Lichfield's agents took place. Compensation of £10,000 was initially offered to the Earl by the railway, but he replied that he was not prepared to accept any sum less than £20,000. In a letter to Colonel Anson, he wrote "I have no wish ever to live [at Shugborough] again, and therefore in decidedly objecting to the proposed line, I have been able to consider it without any special partiality to the place itself. I took it as a prime matter of damage and compensation and have no hesitation in saying that I think £20,000 no compensation whatever in proportion to the damage." Colonel Anson himself wrote to the company thereafter to agree that the new line would lessen the value of the estate, but not be so much a nuisance as the Earl imagined. Though not wishing to lose the £40,000 compensation − a figure supported by the Earl − by having the line go by an alternative route, he concluded that use of a tunnel to pass through Shugborough Park would be the only plan free from further objections.

By December, an agreement was reached for passing the proposed line through the Earl's land for a £30,000 inducement. The Trent Valley Railway Bill was passed by Parliament on 29 April 1845 and two days later, an agreement was signed with the Earl's trustees. The Bill was specific in its detail of the route, the build specification and all the monies to be paid to the Earl of Lichfield for land taken at Shugborough. It required guard fencing for 40 yards (37 m) around the tunnel entrance to hide the trains, and for the portals to be neatly faced with stone, but without mentioning specific ornamentation; Locke and John Livock, the Company Architect, were respectful when designing the portals due to its historic surroundings, especially the Hall and the follies in the park, including the Triumphal Arch (now Grade I listed), under which the tunnel almost directly passes.

Despite the tunnel being built on a curve, it was relatively simple to excavate; compacted gravel held in a matrix of red marl required gunpowder to hew the tunnel, and it was able to support itself even before the brickwork lining was installed. It took less than two years for the Trent Valley Railway's completion, with the cutting of the tunnel (constructed by a group of contractors led by Thomas Brassey) swift in comparison to the negotiations preceding, and was opened fully on 31 October 1846.

=== After opening ===
The tunnel was the site of an incident in 1866, in which a prisoner under guard travelling on a train through the tunnel jumped from a carriage in the darkness, escaping and leaving only an open door for the surprised guard emerging into the light. The prisoner, though injuring himself on the tunnel wall, survived.

The tunnel entrances are recorded in the National Heritage List for England as a Grade II listed building, having been designated on 17 March 1953. Grade II is the lowest of the three grades of listing, and is applied to "buildings that are nationally important and of special interest".

The tunnel and whole Trent Valley Line were electrified in the 1960s with 25kV AC overhead wires. The line was also quadrupled except for through the tunnel which is double-track. Shugborough Tunnel received a temporary speed restriction in 2011 due to restricted headroom caused by years of ongoing track maintenance raising the rails. A £2.5 million Network Rail project to lower and replace the track by 1 metre (3 ft 3 in) took place during a possession from 24 December 2012 to 2 January 2013, making it compliant with modern clearance standards required for containerised rail freight. Drains and service cables were also renewed during the works. InterCity trains are now able to run through the tunnel at 100 miles per hour (160 km/h).
