= Battle of Newbury =

Battle of Newbury may refer to:

- First Battle of Newbury, 20 September 1643
- Second Battle of Newbury, 27 October 1644
- Third Battle of Newbury, January--April 1996, a large anti-road protest over the building of the Newbury Bypass.
