= Shugborough Hall =

Grade I listed historic house museum in the United Kingdom

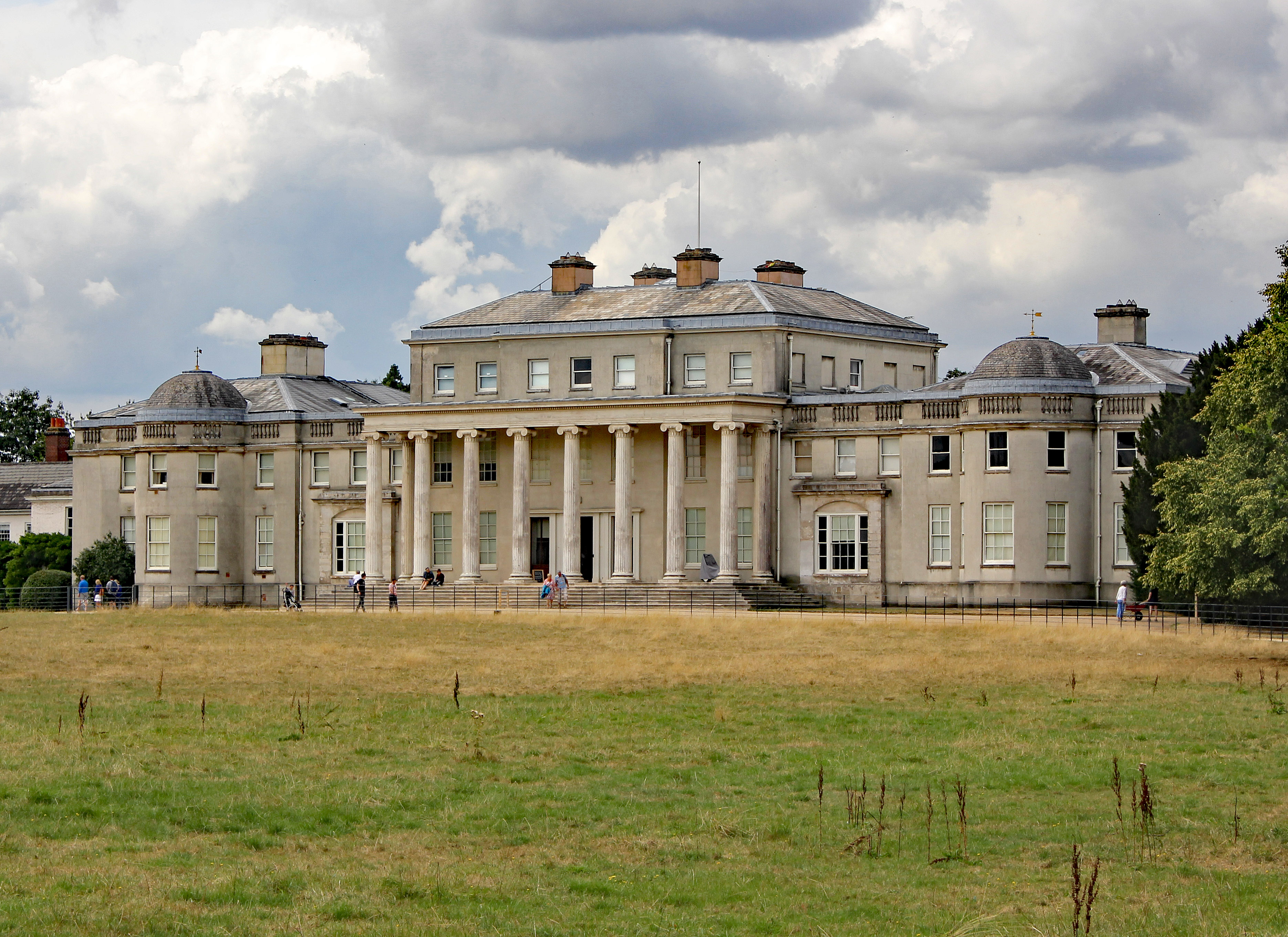
- Front of the Hall, with Ionic colonnade

- Location within Staffordshire

General information
- Architectural style: Neo-Classical, Italianate
- Location: Great Haywood, Staffordshire, England
- Coordinates: 52.80005°N 2.01295°W
- Owner: National Trust, Earl of Lichfield (formerly)

Design and construction
- Architects: Thomas Wright; Samuel Wyatt; James Stuart

Website
- Official website

Shugborough Hall is a stately home near Great Haywood, Staffordshire, England.

The mansion house is situated on the edge of Cannock Chase, about 5.8 miles (9.3 km) east of Stafford and 4.7 miles (7.6 km) from Rugeley. The estate was owned by the Bishops of Lichfield until the dissolution of the monasteries, upon which it passed through several hands before being purchased in 1624 by William Anson, a local lawyer and ancestor of the Earls of Lichfield. The estate remained in the Anson family for three centuries. Following the death of the 4th Earl of Lichfield in 1960, the estate was allocated to the National Trust in lieu of death duties, and then immediately leased to Staffordshire County Council. Management of the estate was returned to the National Trust in 2016. It is open to the public and comprises the mansion house, museum, kitchen garden and a model farm.

== History ==
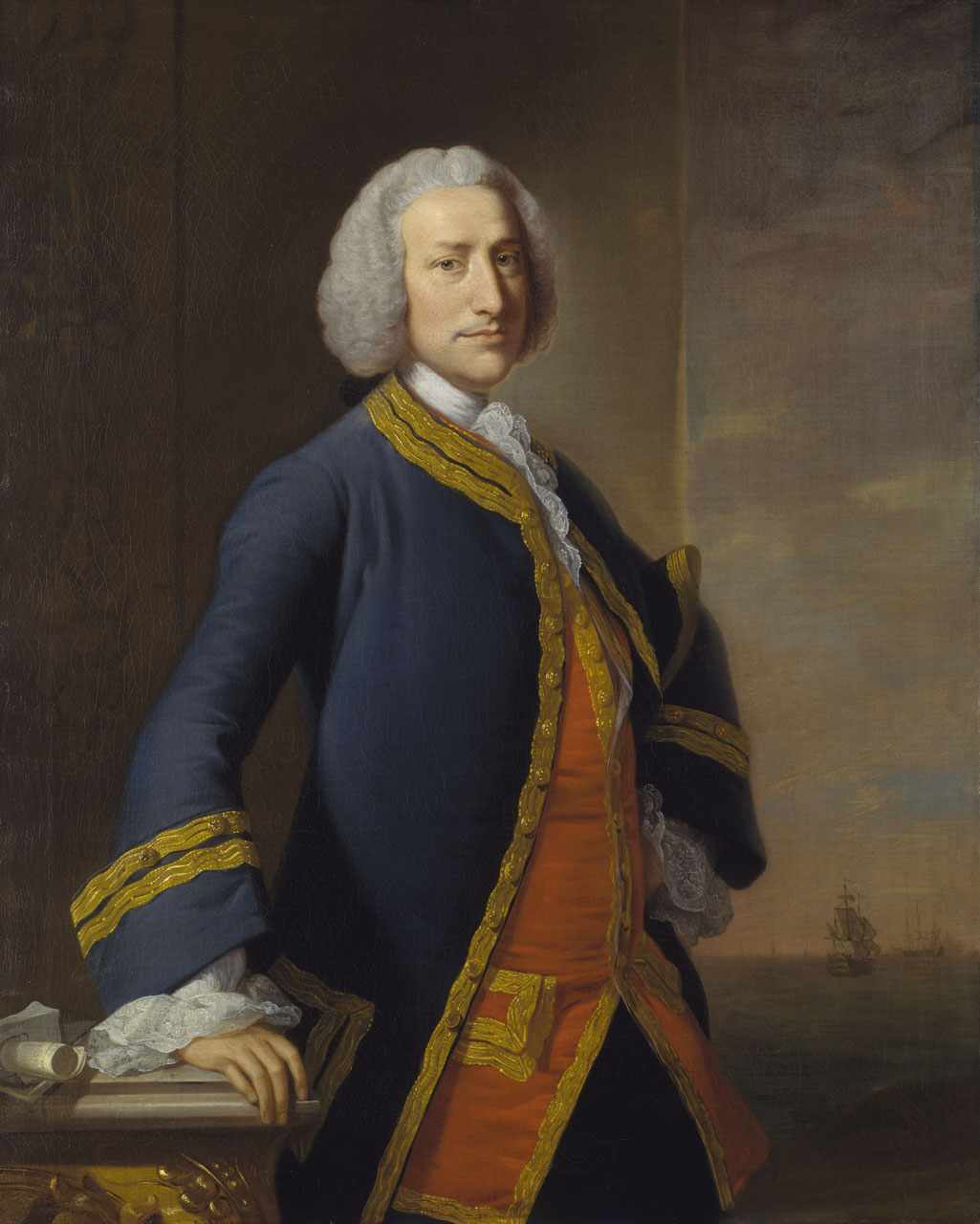
Admiral George Anson, 1st Baron Anson

The Shugborough estate was owned by the Bishops of Lichfield until the dissolution of the monasteries around 1540, and thereafter passed through several hands, until it was purchased in 1624 by William Anson (c.1580–1644), a lawyer, of Dunston, Staffordshire for £1,000. In 1693, William Anson's grandson, also called William (1656–1720), demolished the existing manor house and constructed a three-story building which still forms the central part of the hall.

William's elder son, Thomas Anson MP (1695-1773), further extended the house in the 1740s, adding two pavilions flanking either side of the central block. These changes were funded by Thomas's younger brother, Admiral George Anson, created Lord Anson in 1747 and First Lord of the Admiralty in 1751. He had amassed a great fortune during his naval career, and when he died without issue he left the majority to his elder brother. Thomas also died childless and the estate passed to his sister's son, George Adams, who adopted the surname Anson by royal licence.

In 1806, George's son Thomas (1767–1818) was created 1st Viscount Anson, and his son, the 2nd viscount, was created 1st Earl of Lichfield in the 1831 Coronation Honours. The Earl led an extravagant lifestyle and amassed several large debts, which, in 1842, forced him to sell the entire contents of the house in a two-week-long sale. While Thomas George Anson, 2nd Earl of Lichfield did much to restore the house and contents to its former glory, by the time his son inherited the estate it was heavily mortgaged.

In 1831, Princess Alexandrina Victoria of Kent, the future Queen Victoria, then 12, visited Shugborough with her mother, the Duchess of Kent, as part of an extensive tour of the country. The young princess stayed with many local landowners at the time, including John Talbot, 16th Earl of Shrewsbury.

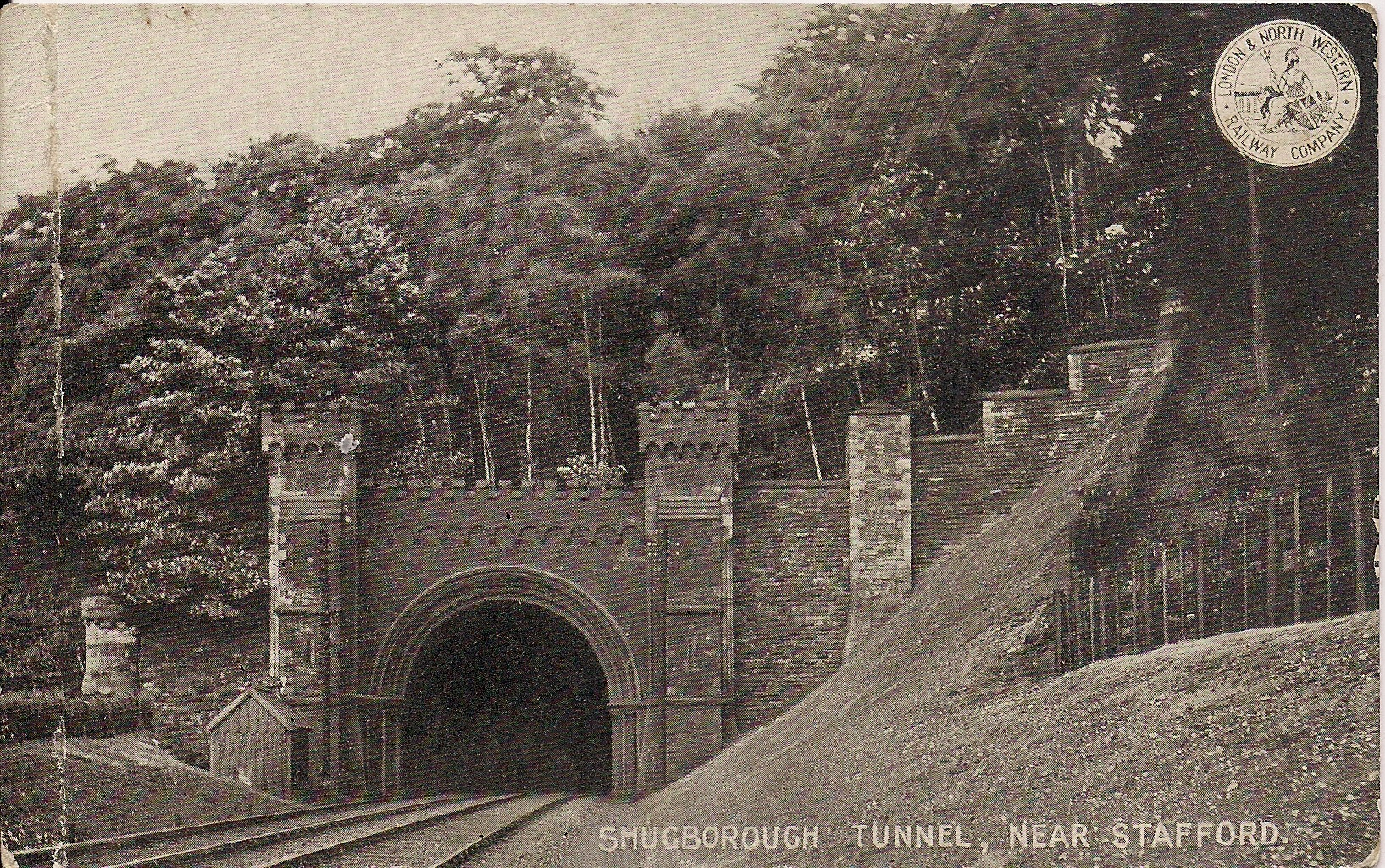
Shugborough Tunnel - postcard, 1900s

Passing from east to west through the southern part of the park is the Trent Valley Line, planned in 1845. The railway runs underground in the 777-yard (710 m) Shugborough Tunnel and therefore has minimal visual impact. The tunnel entrances, which are listed grade II, are highly decorated, in particular the western approach which dates from 1847. The drive to the hall is carried over the tunnel by a bridge, about 380 yards (350 m) north-west of the Lichfield Lodge, which also dates from 1847 and also listed at grade II. The double-track line is part of the West Coast Main Line, running north-west between Colwich Junction and Stafford.

=== Late 20th century and today ===
Following the death of the 4th Earl in 1960, an agreement was reached whereby the estate would pass to the National Trust in lieu of death duties. The deal was finalised and the house opened to the public in 1966. The estate was immediately leased to Staffordshire County Council, who managed and maintained it on behalf of the National Trust, with Patrick Anson, 5th Earl of Lichfield retaining an apartment in the hall until his death in 2005, paying a nominal rent to the new owners. His successor, the 6th Earl, decided to relinquish the lease of the apartments, thus severing the family's direct links with the estate.

In 2016 Staffordshire County Council handed the estate back to the National Trust, with 49 years remaining on its lease. The move is expect to save the council £35 million, with the Trust intending to renew investment in the property.

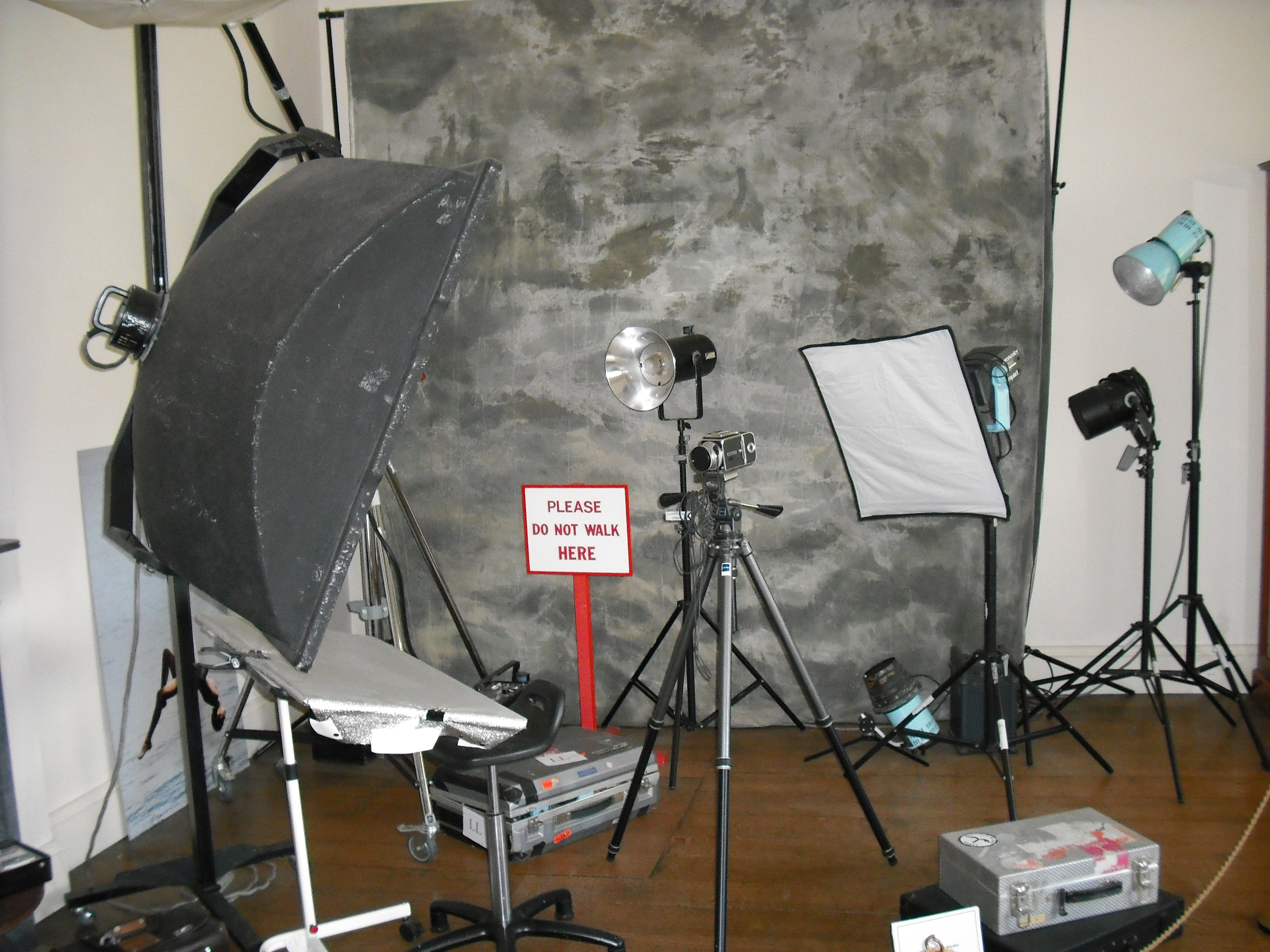
Part of the exhibition of the work of Lord Lichfield

The grounds and mansion house are open to the public. The attraction is marketed as "The Complete Working Historic Estate", which includes a working model farm museum dating from 1805 complete with a working watermill, kitchens, a dairy, a tea room, and rare breeds of farm animals. Originally restored in 1990, the estate's brewery is England's only log-fired brewery that still produces beer commercially. Previously used only on special occasions, the brewhouse has been a working exhibit since 2007, operated by Titanic Brewery.

Since 2011 the private apartments have housed an exhibition of the work of Patrick Lichfield. His cameras and lighting gear have been set up in a recreation of his studio, and there is a gallery of some of his most famous photographic subjects.

== Architecture ==
=== Interior ===
==== The state rooms ====
The state rooms at Shugborough include The State Dining Room, The Red Drawing Room, The Library, The Saloon, The Verandah Room, The Anson Room and The State Bedroom. These contain some of the most opulent and highly decorated interiors in the hall.

The Verandah Room contains a 208-piece porcelain dinner service commissioned to commemorate Admiral Anson's circumnavigation of the globe in HMS Centurion. The dinner service was offered to Admiral Anson in gratitude for assisting in fighting the huge fires that were destroying the merchant district in Canton. (Story narrated by Shugborough guide October 2015). The State Bedroom overlooks the terrace and was occupied by Queen Victoria during her childhood visit.

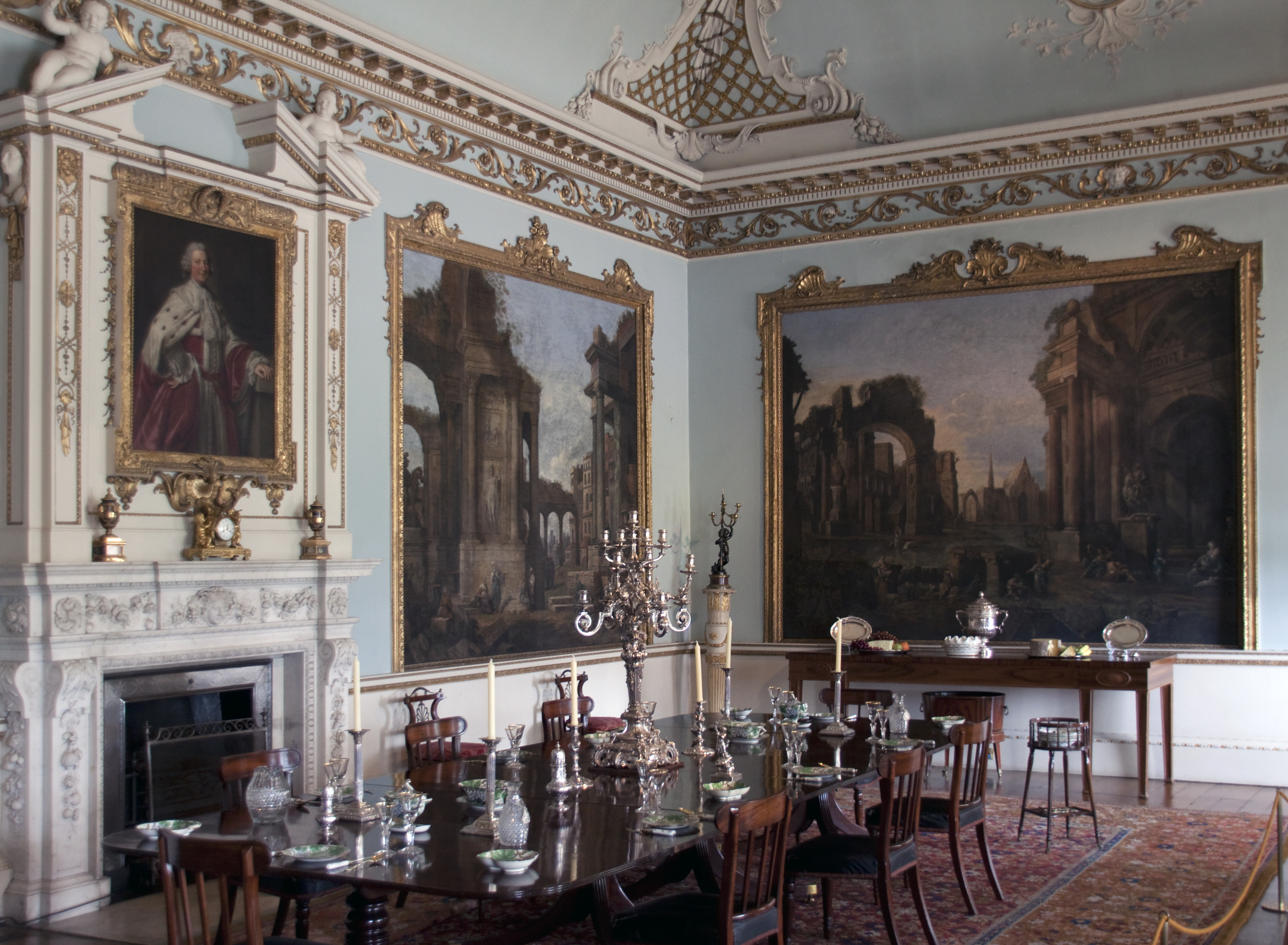
The State Dining Room

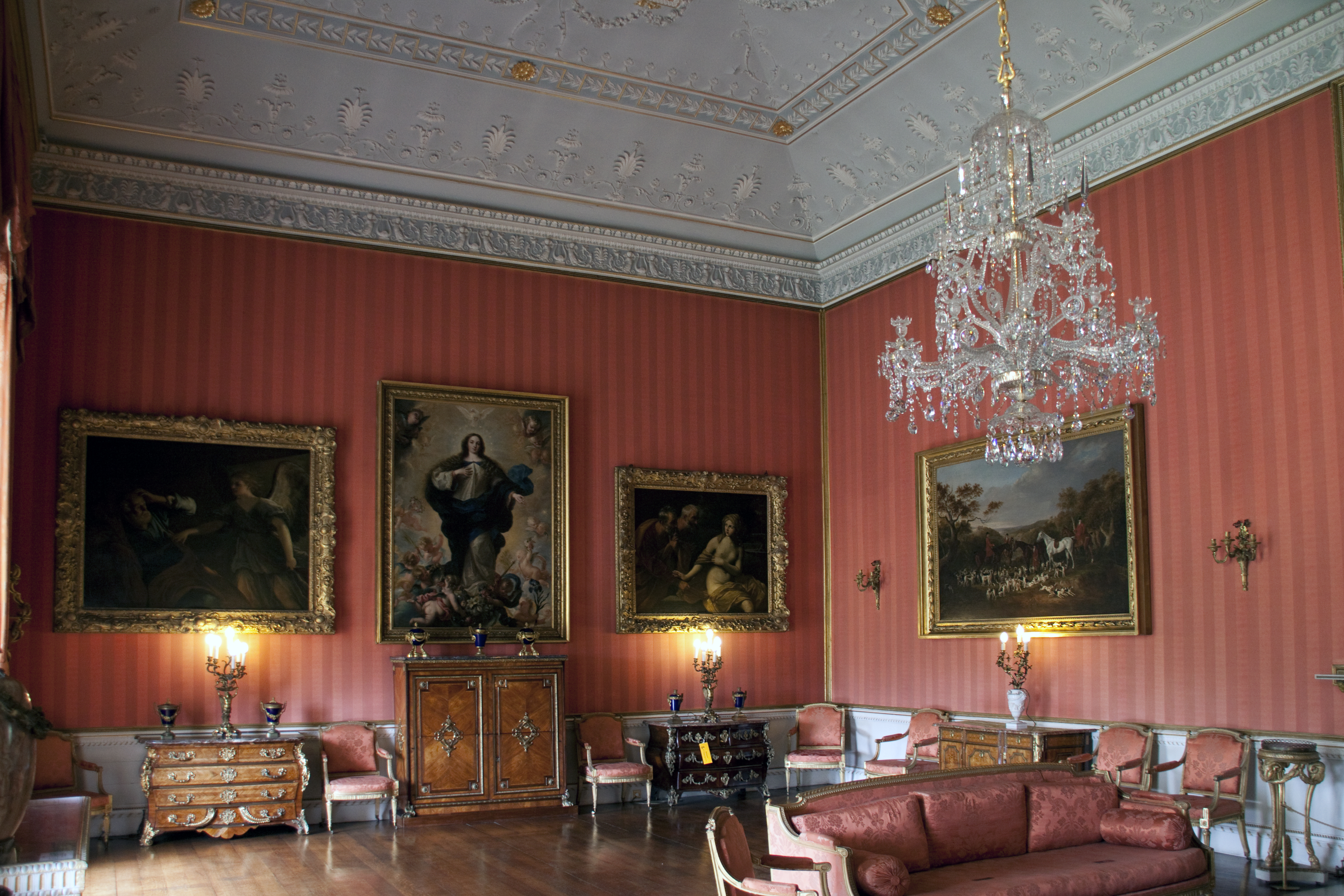
The Red Drawing Room

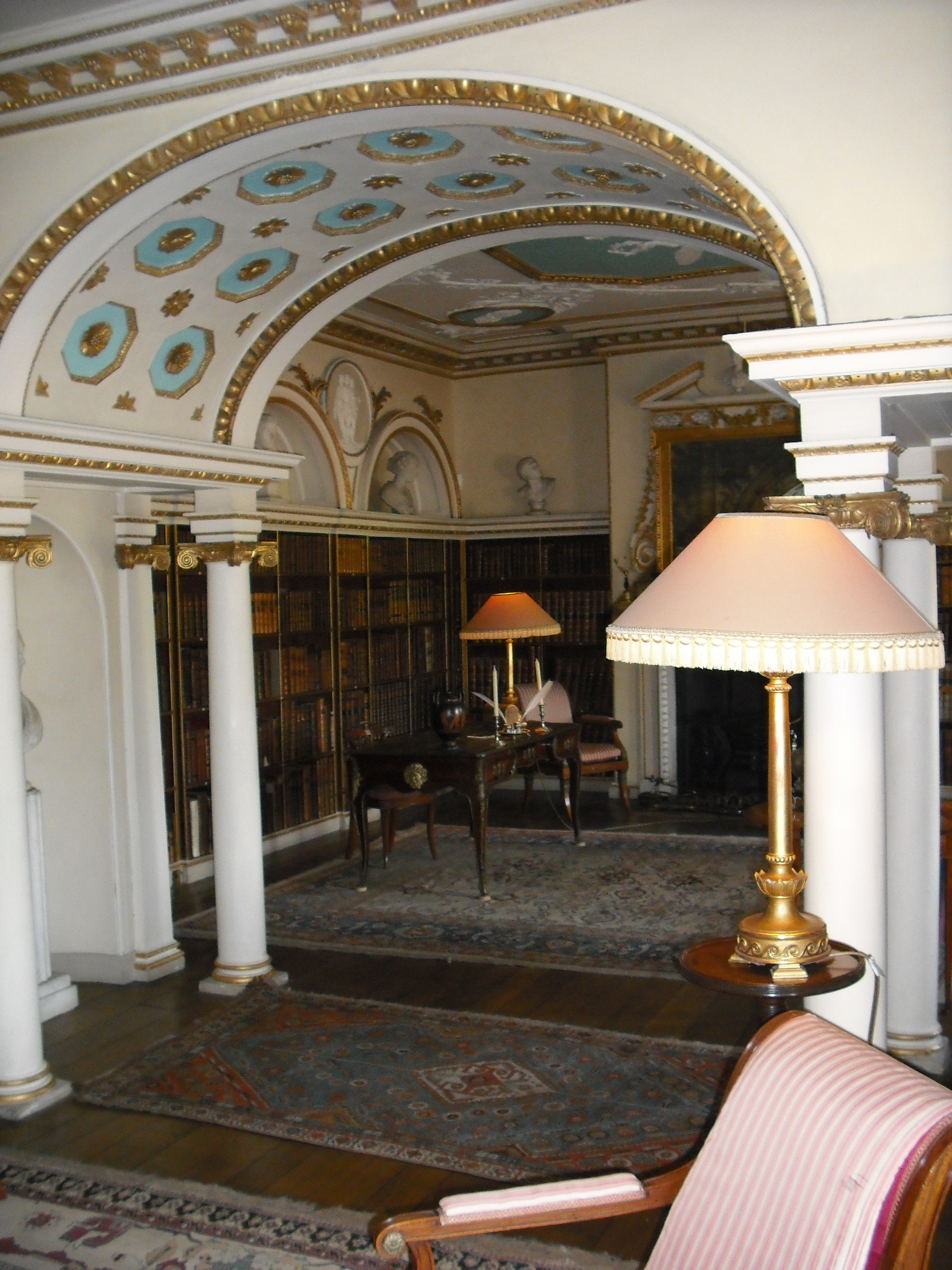
The Library

==== Private apartments ====
The private apartments were the living quarters of 5th Earl and his family until 2010. The Boudoir, with its silver gilt wallpaper, is the only room in the hall with hand-painted ceilings with gold detailing. Other rooms include The Lilac and Yellow Bedrooms, The Sitting Room and the completely circular Breakfast Room.

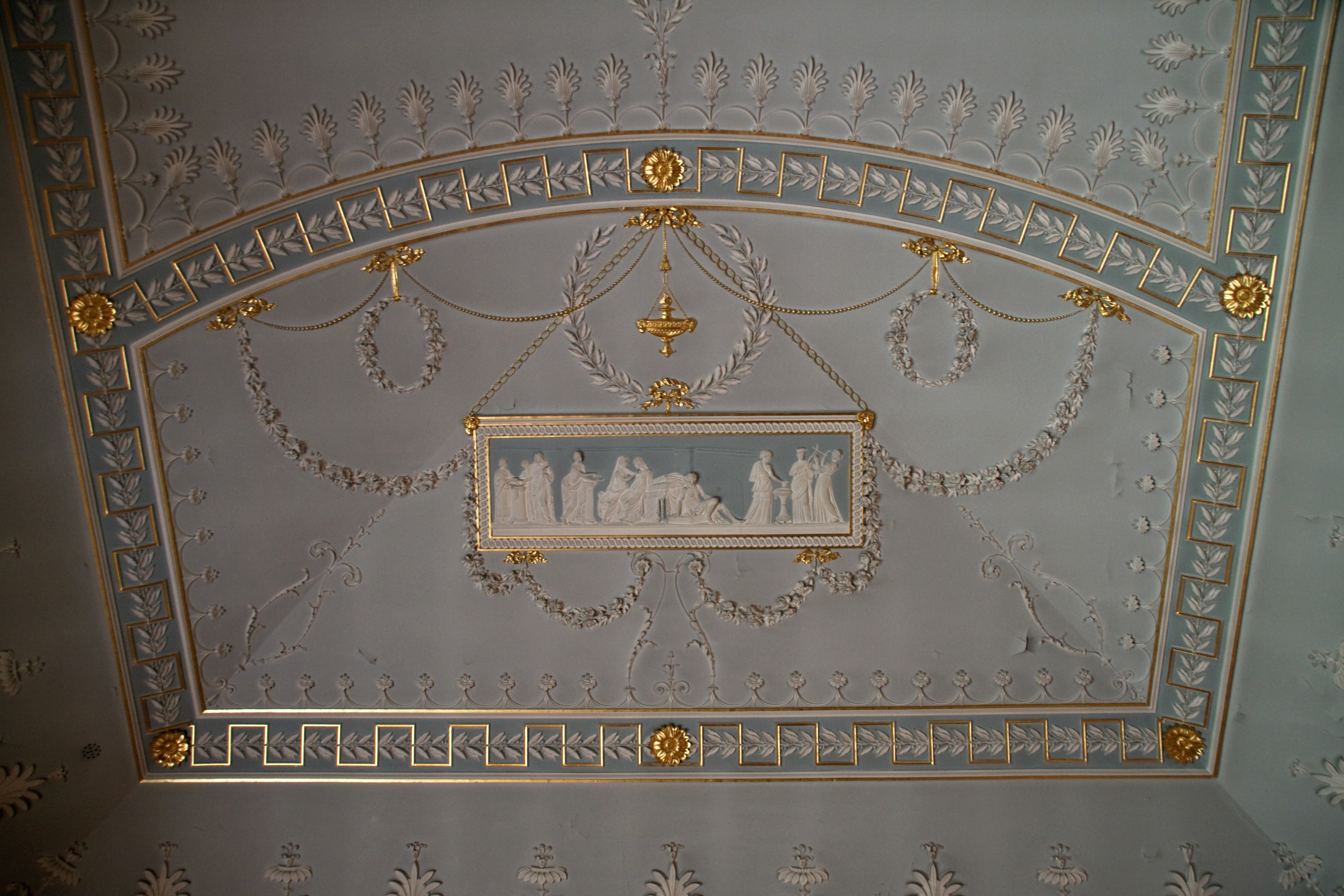
The hand-painted ceiling of The Boudoir

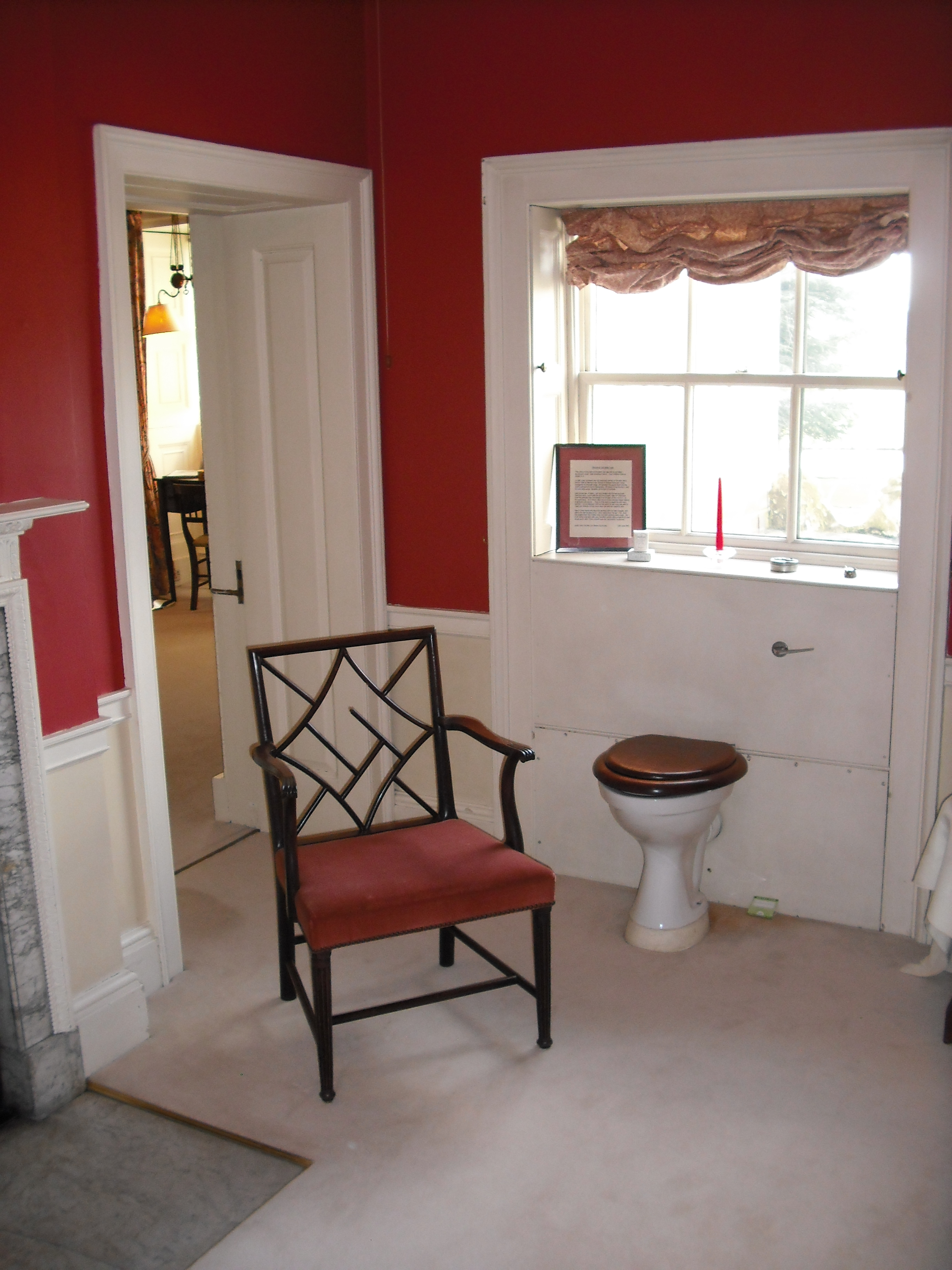
Guests' bathroom

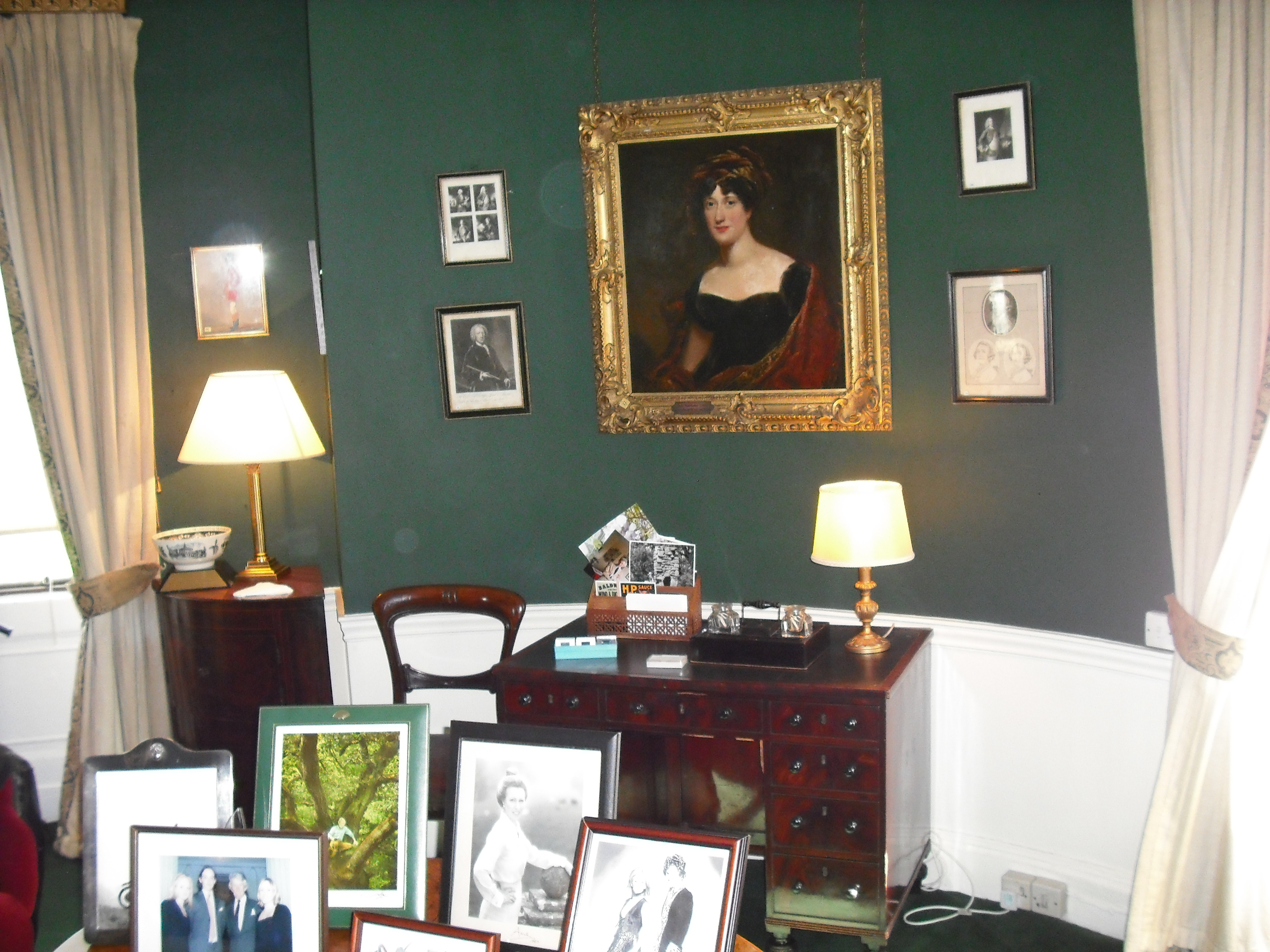
Green sitting room, detail

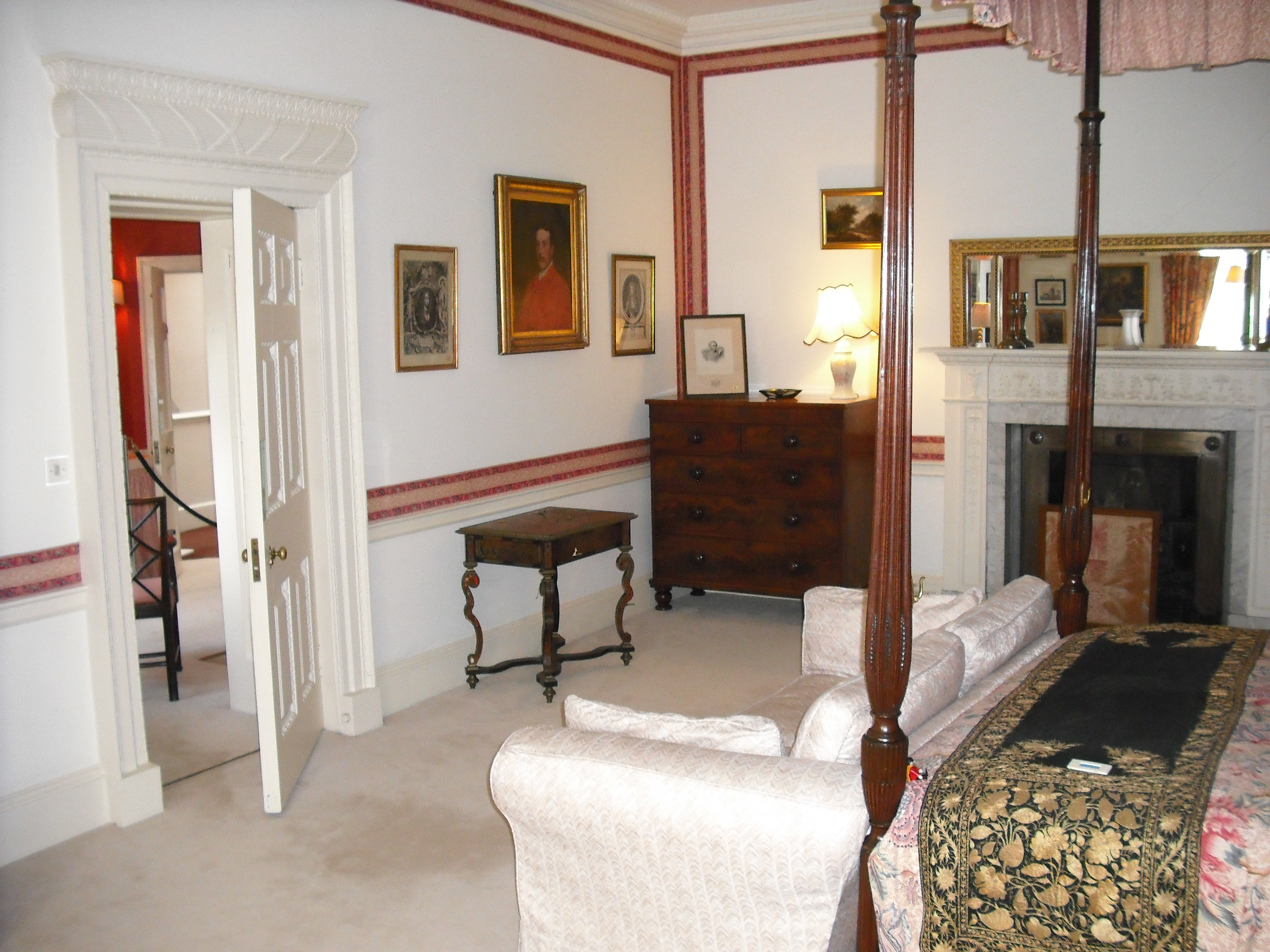
Bedroom

=== Exterior ===
In about 1693, William Anson (1656–1720) demolished the old house and created a new mansion. The entrance front, then facing to the west, comprised a balustraded, three-storey, seven-bayed central block. In about 1748 his great-grandson Thomas Anson (1767–1818) commissioned architect Thomas Wright to remodel the house, which was extended with flanking two-storey, three-bayed pavilions linked to the central block by pedimented passages.

At the turn of the 19th century, the house was further altered and extended by architect Samuel Wyatt. The pavilions and passages were incorporated into the main building, and a new porticoed entrance front with ten Ionic pillars was created at the east. These pillars resemble carved stone but are hollow timber structures. This was done for Thomas Anson, 1st Viscount Anson and his wife Anne Margaret Coke, daughter of Thomas Coke, 1st Earl of Leicester, whom he married in 1794. The hall, as it is seen today, is built in a neo-classical style and encased in slate, sanded to resemble stone.

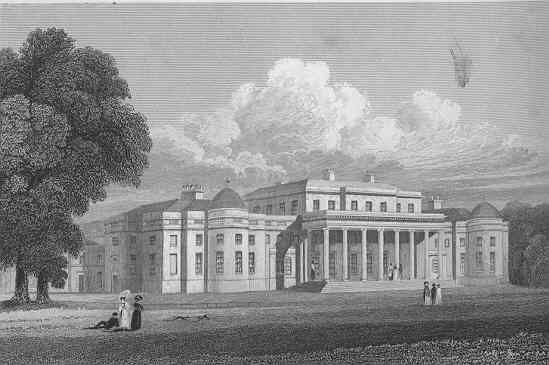
Shugborough in the 1820s

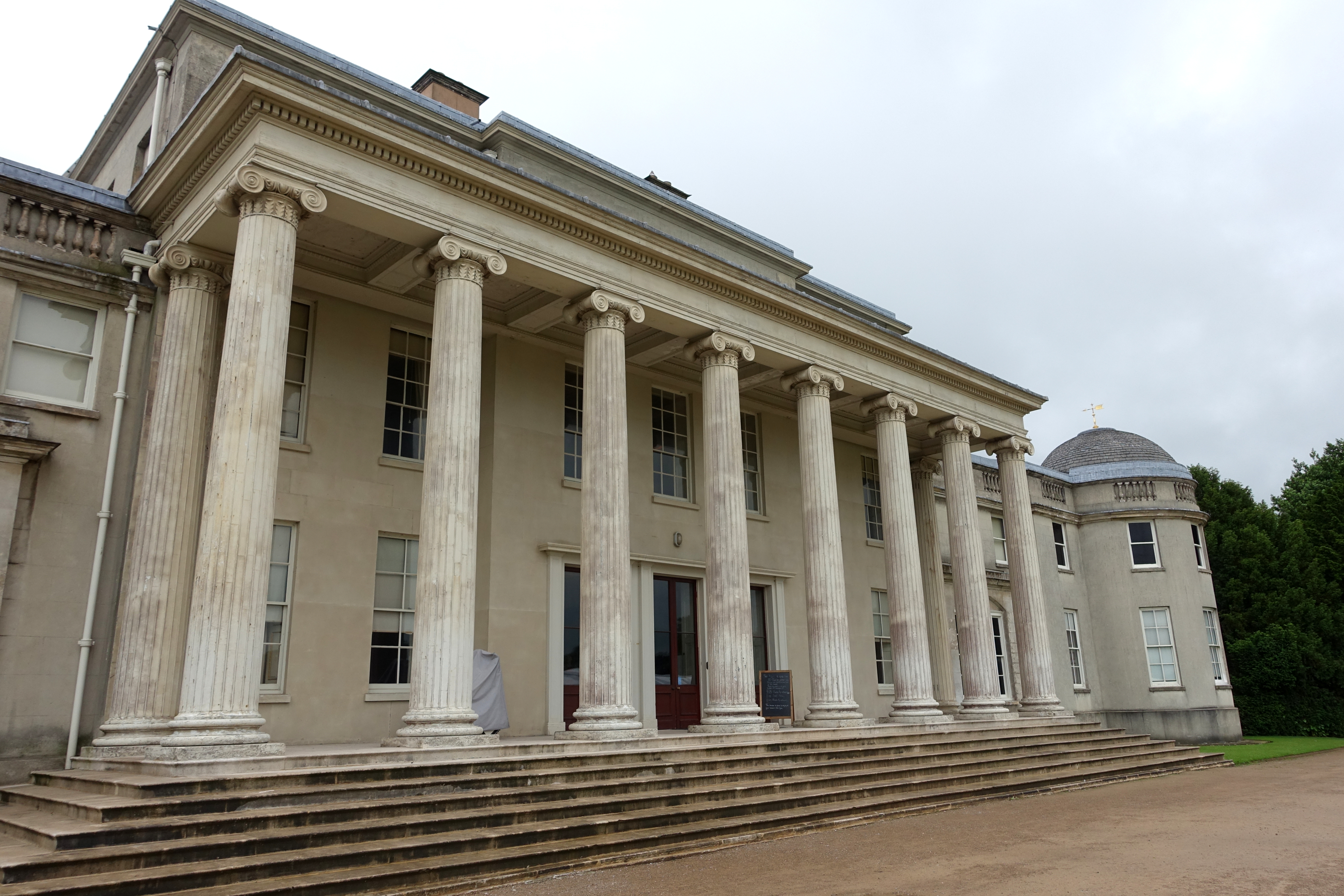
The 18th century Ionic portico

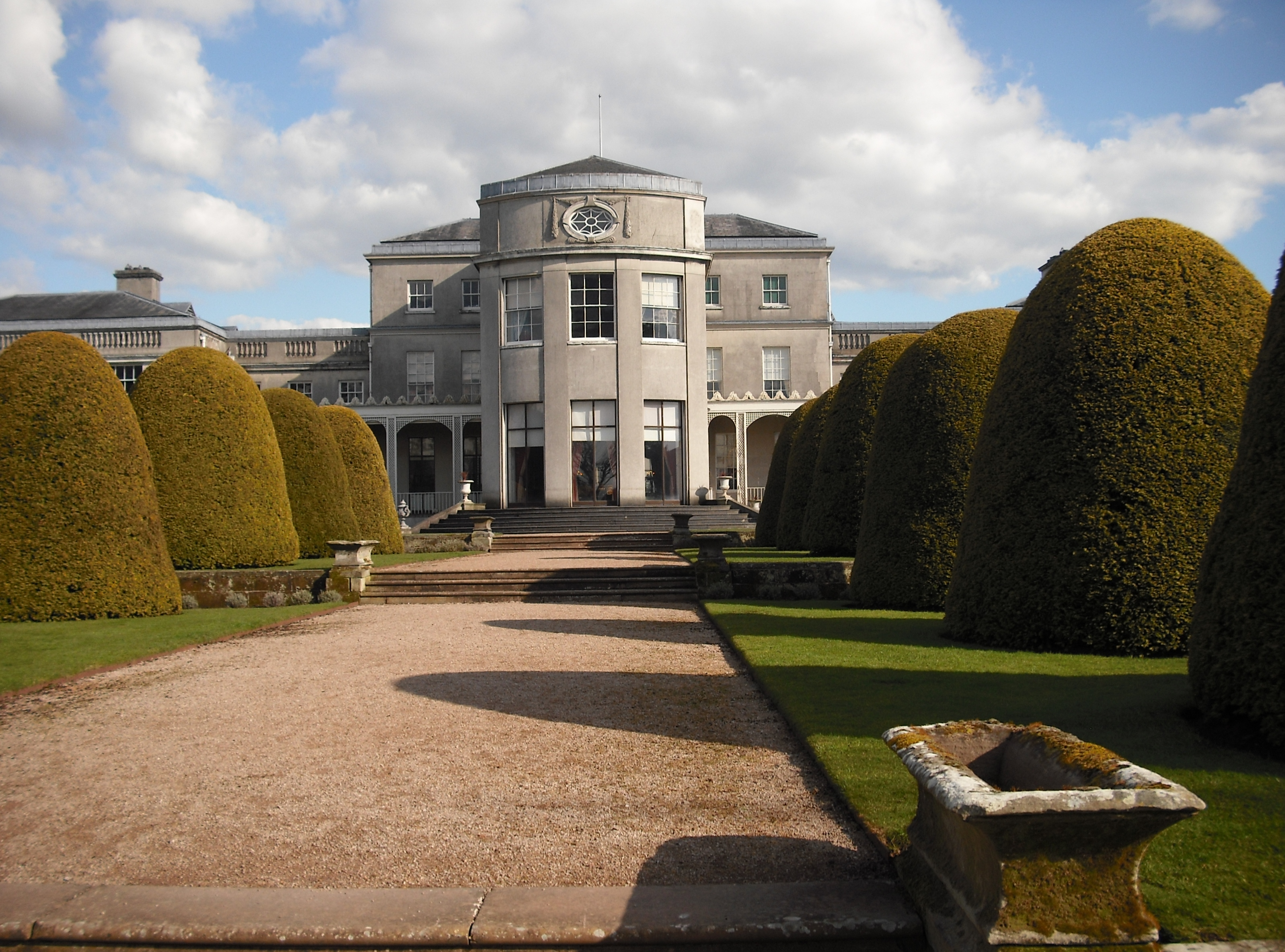
The rear façade of the hall

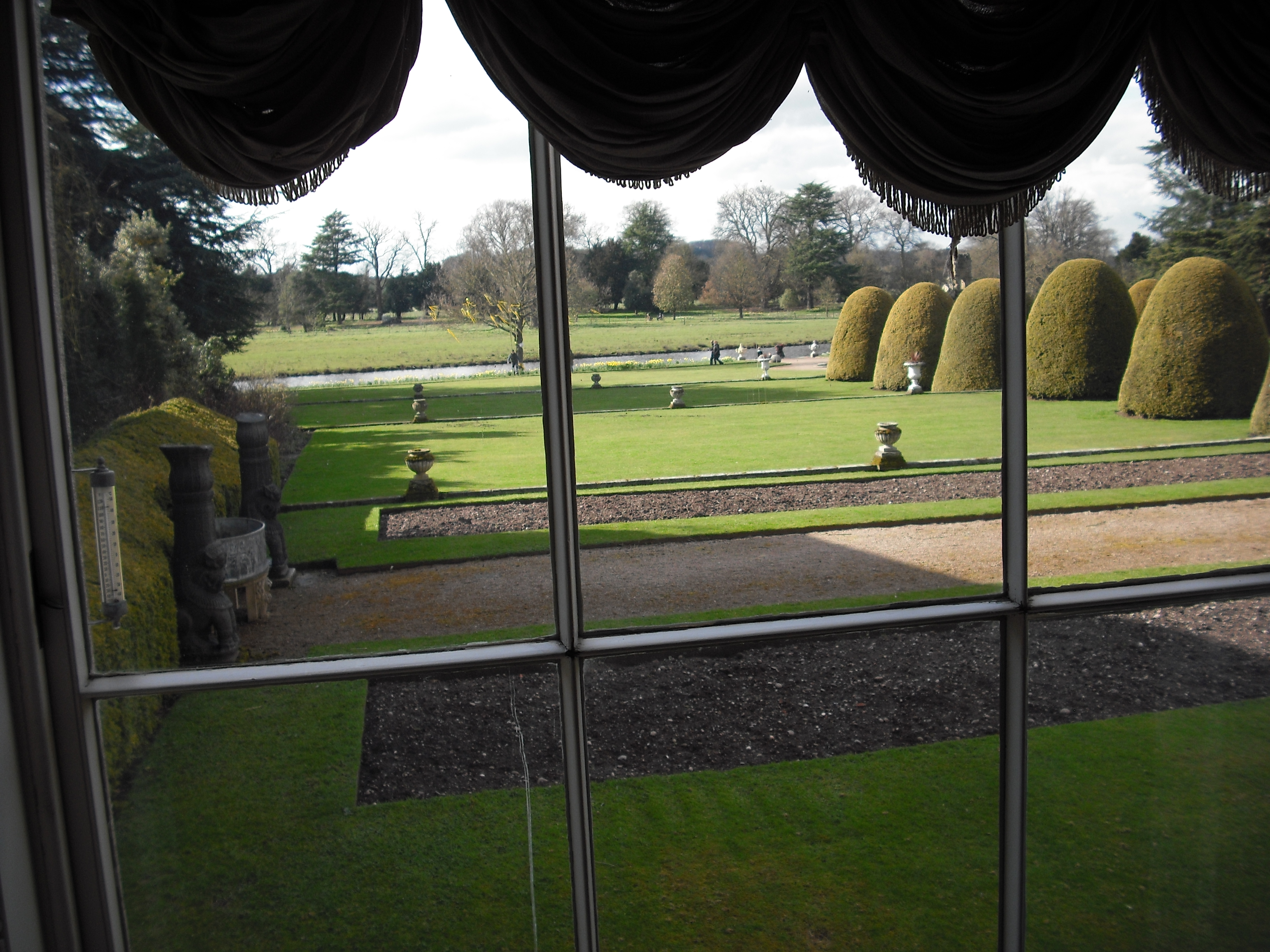
The garden from the house

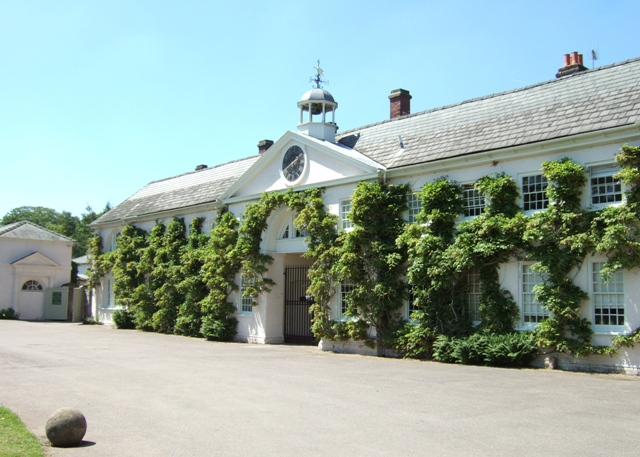
The stable block in 2009

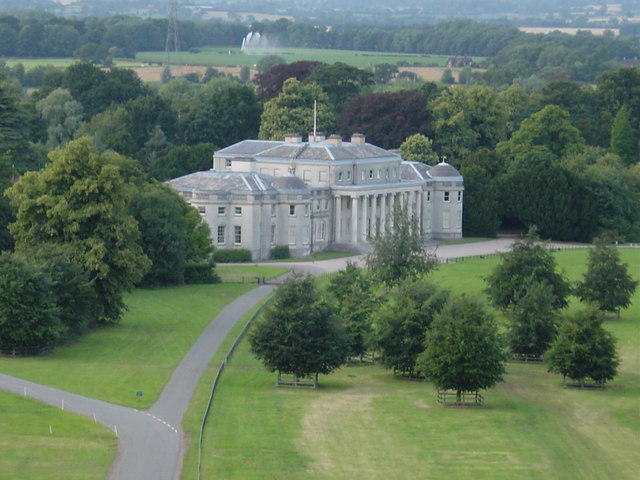
The hall seen from a hot air balloon

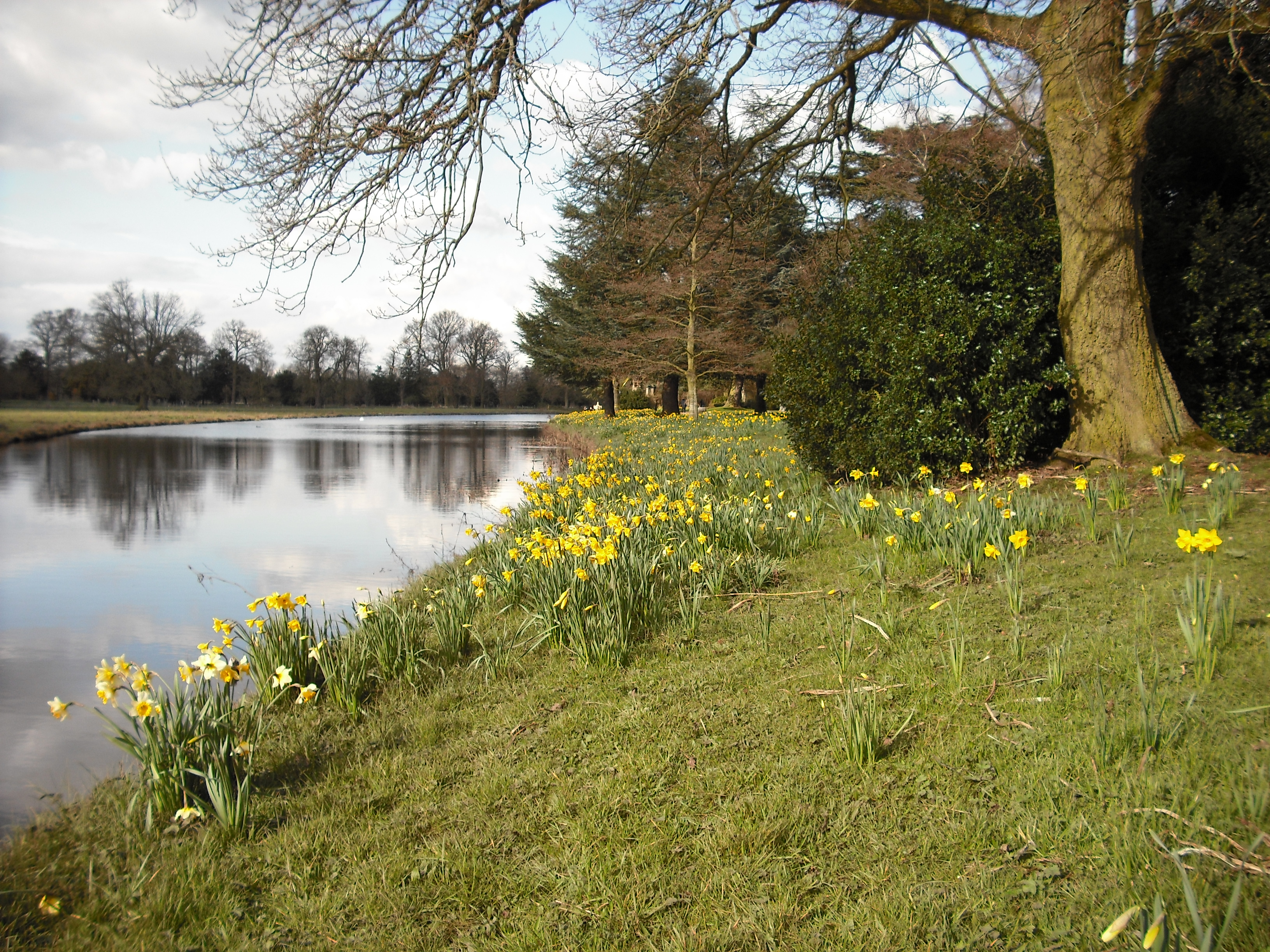
River Sow at the rear of the Hall

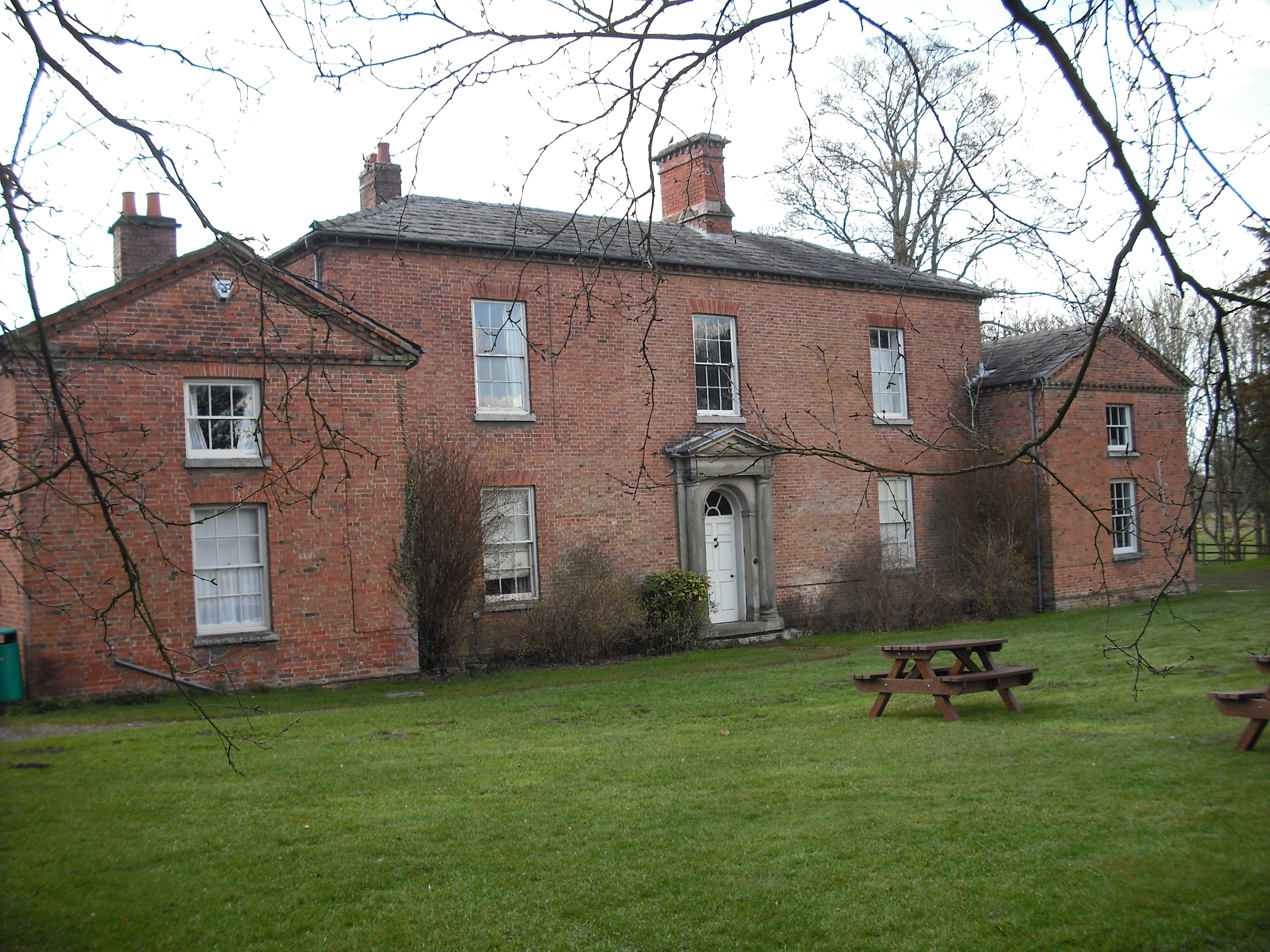
The farmhouse

=== The park and follies ===
Like many landowners of his time, Thomas Anson (1695–1773) took a keen interest in the landscaping of his parkland. The land around Shugborough was largely flat, which ensured that trees, follies and water would play an important role in shaping the landscape. The grounds contain a number of follies, many of which, such as The Chinese House and two Chinese-style bridges, have a Chinese theme, in honour of Admiral George Anson. Admiral Anson, who had visited Canton, left a considerable sum of money to his brother Thomas Anson when he died, which was used to develop the hall and estate. The Chinese House and the red iron footbridge are both grade I listed.

In 1760, Classical architect James Stuart was employed to design a number of monuments. Stuart had visited Athens in the early 1750s, and Ancient Greek influences are obvious at Shugborough. Stuart designed for Anson a copy of the Choragic Monument of Lysicrates and a grade I listed triumphal arch based on the Arch of Hadrian in Athens.

==== The Shepherd's Monument ====
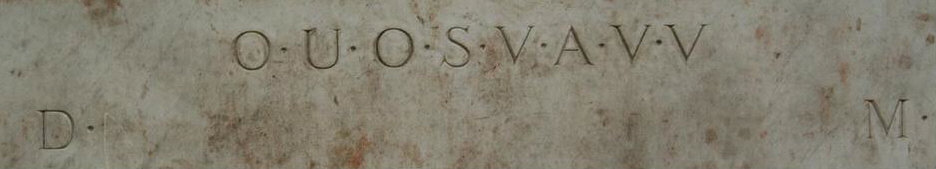
The Shugborough inscription

The Shepherd's Monument is a stone and marble folly within the grounds of Shugborough hall, engraved with the inscriptions "O.U.O.S.V.A.V.V" and "D.M.". The monument has been internationally well-known since 1982, when the book The Holy Blood and the Holy Grail drew attention to the mysterious Shugborough inscription. Carved by Peter Scheemakers, theories have abounded, including some which suggest it may indicate the whereabouts of the Holy Grail.

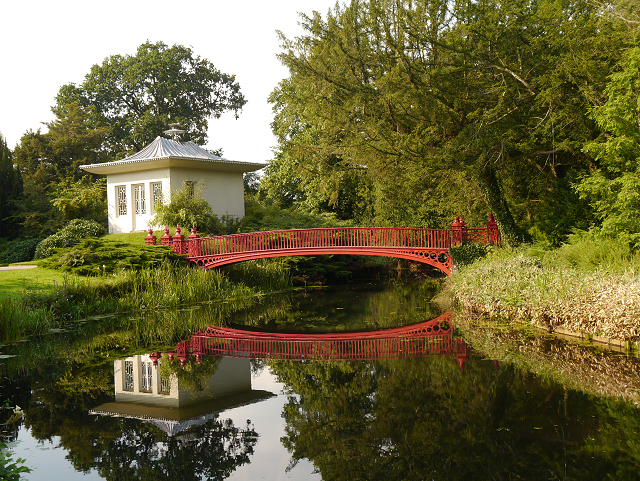
The Chinese House

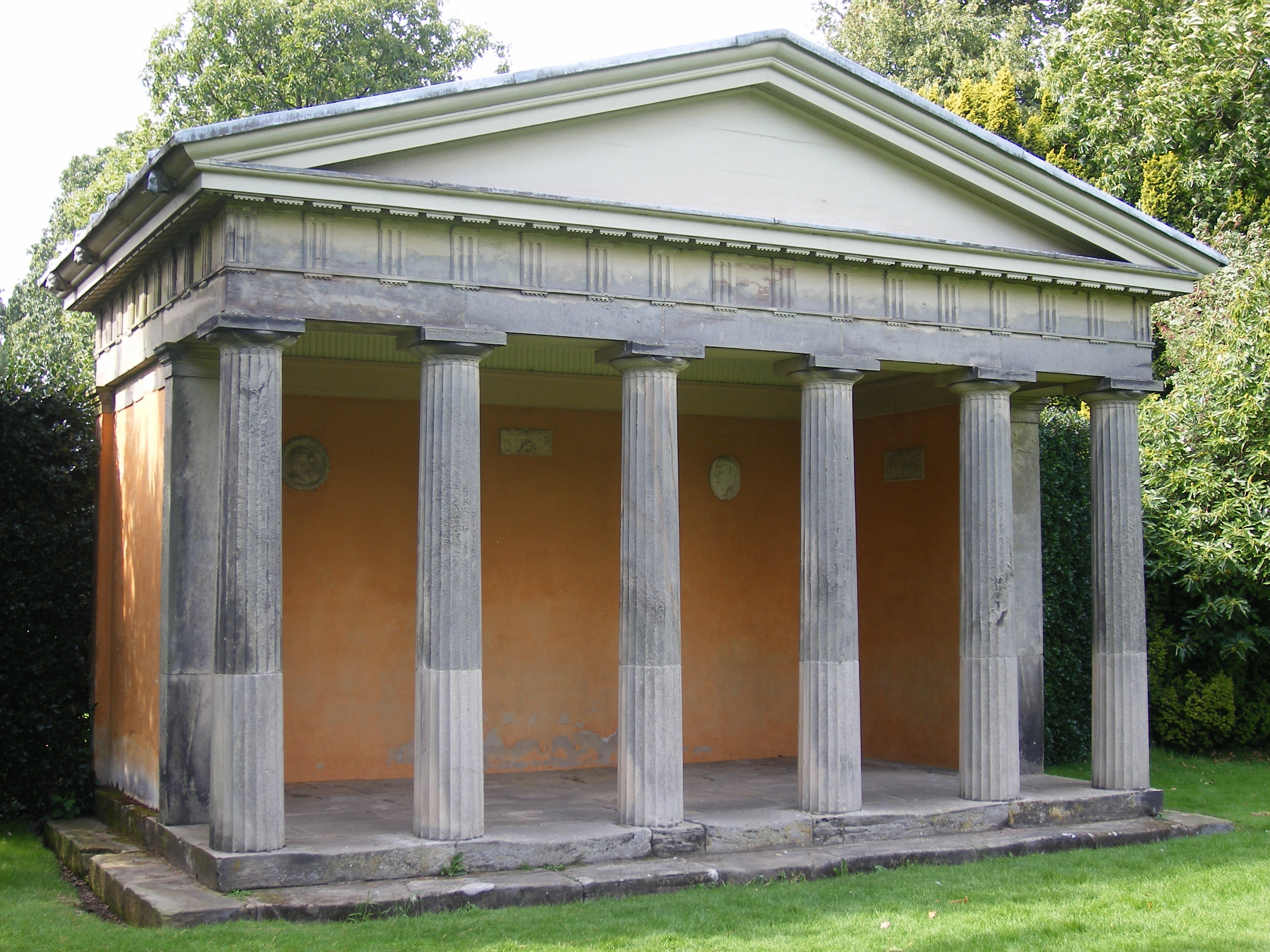
The Doric Temple

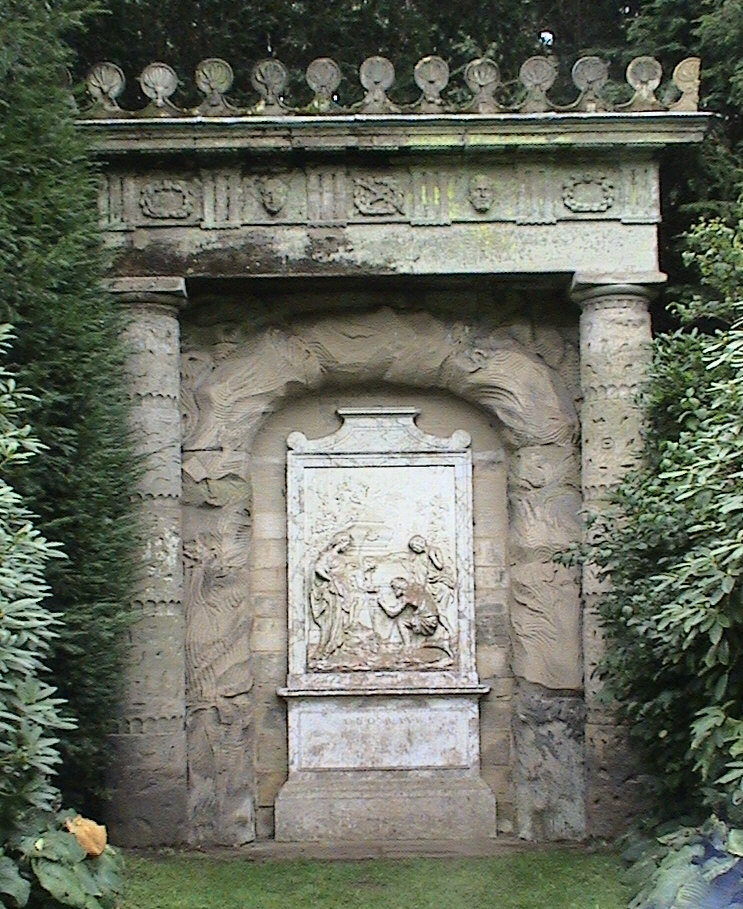
The Shepherd's Monument

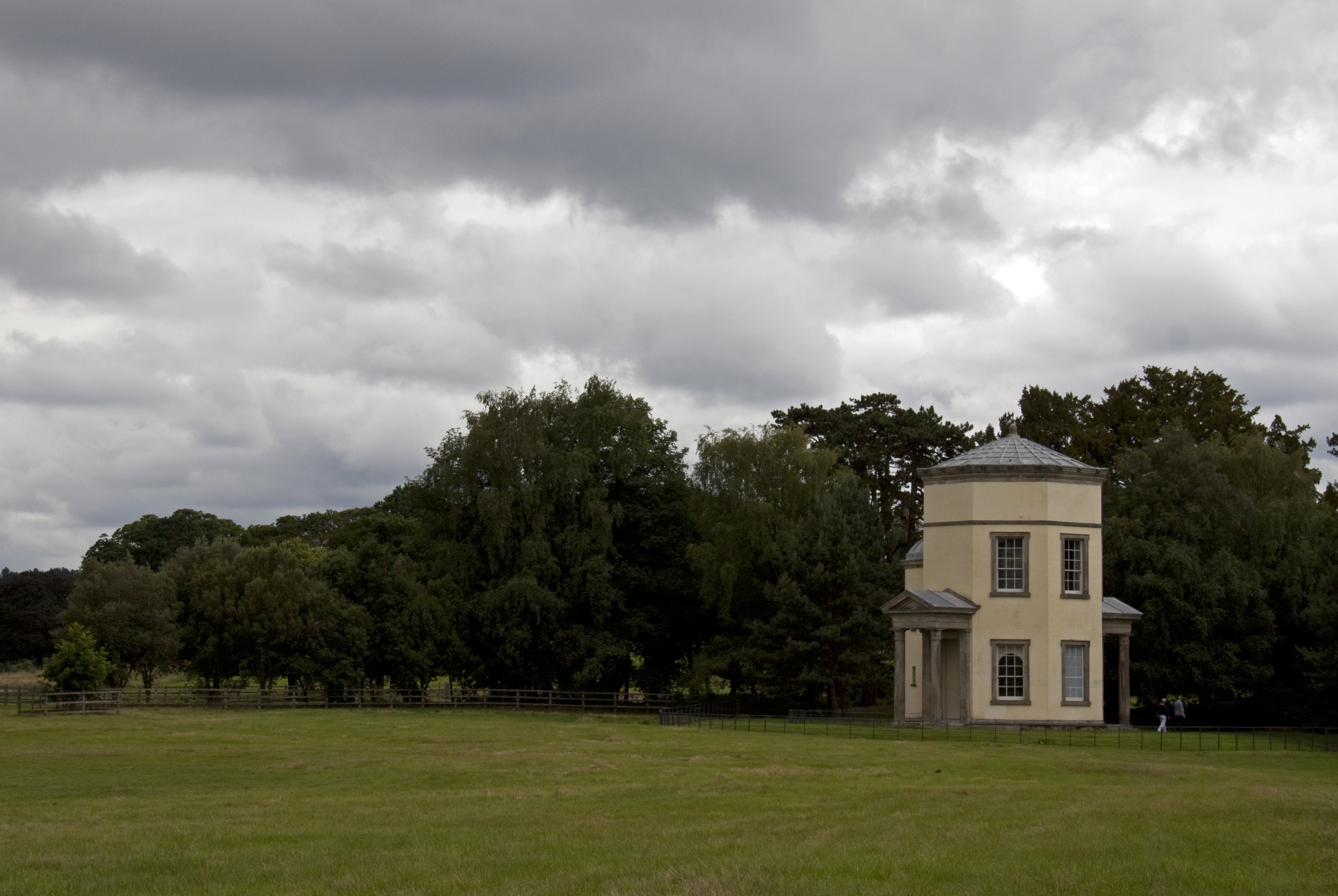
The Tower of the Winds

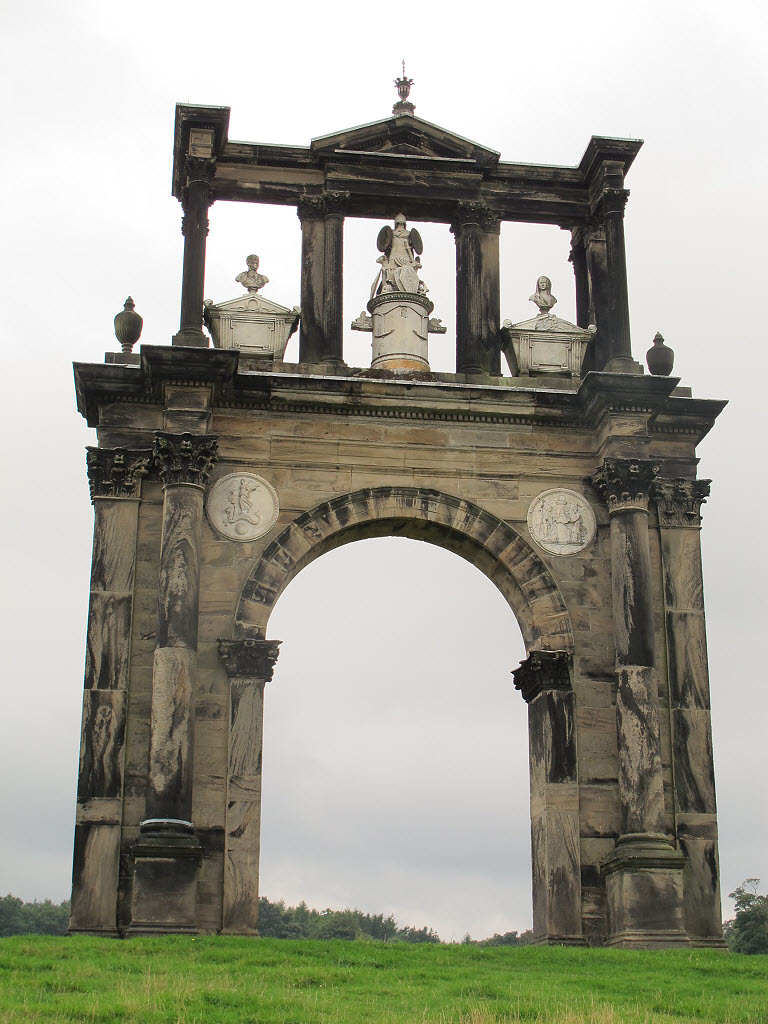
Arch of Hadrian

== See also ==
- Grade I listed buildings in Staffordshire
- Listed buildings in Colwich, Staffordshire

== References and sources ==
=== Sources ===
- "A Brief History of Shugborough". The National Trust. n.d.
- Belfield, Richard (2007). The Six Unsolved Ciphers: Inside the Mysterious Codes That Have Confounded the World's Greatest Cryptographers. CA, USA: Ulysses Press. ISBN 9781569756287.
- Black, Jeremy (2007). Culture in Eighteenth-Century England: A Subject for Taste. Hambledon Continuum. ISBN 9781852855345.
- Jackson-Stops, Gervase (1981). National Trust Studies 1981. Sotheby Parke Bernet. ISBN 9780856671104.
- McGilchrist, John (1868). The public life of queen Victoria. London: Casser, Petter and Galpin.
- "Museums". The National Trust.
- "Shugborough: A complete working historic estate". The National Trust. n.d.
- "The Mansion House". The National Trust. n.d.
- Robinson, John Martin (1986). The Architecture of Northern England. London: Macmillan. ISBN 9780333373965.
- "Shugborough Revisited". The National Trust. n.d.
