= Thomas Anson, 4th Earl of Lichfield =

British peer, soldier and landowner

The Right Honourable The Earl of Lichfield JP DL
- Born: Thomas Edward Anson; 9 December 1883; Marylebone, London
- Died: 14 September 1960 (aged 76); Bournemouth, Dorset
- Burial place: St Stephen's Church, Great Haywood
- Education: Harrow School
- Alma mater: Trinity College, Cambridge
- Spouses: Evelyn Maud Keppel (m. 1911; died 1945) Violet Philips (m. 1949)
- Children: Thomas Anson, Viscount Anson; Lady Betty Winnington; Edward John Anson; Lady Cecilia Wiggin
- Parents: Thomas Anson, 3rd Earl of Lichfield (father); Lady Mildred Coke (mother)
- Family: Anson family

Thomas Edward Anson, 4th Earl of Lichfield (9 December 1883 – 14 September 1960) styled Viscount Anson from 1892 until 1918, was a British peer, soldier and landowner.

== Biography ==
Born on 9 December 1883 in Marylebone, he was the eldest son of Thomas, Viscount Anson, later 3rd Earl of Lichfield, and Lady Mildred Coke, daughter of Thomas Coke, 2nd Earl of Leicester. He was educated at Harrow School and Trinity College, Cambridge.

Between 1906 and 1910, Lichfield served as acting Master of the Horse to the Lord Lieutenant of Ireland, the Earl of Aberdeen. He served in World War I in the 5th (City of London) Battalion, London Regiment (London Rifle Brigade). He relinquished his commission in 1921, retaining the rank of captain. During World War II, he was listed on the general list of the Territorial Army Reserve of Officers.

He succeeded his father as 4th Earl of Lichfield and inherited the family seat, Shugborough Hall, in 1918. He was a justice of the peace and a deputy lieutenant of Staffordshire, being appointed vice-lieutenant in 1928. He was an alderman on Staffordshire County Council and Lord High Steward of the borough of Stafford.

On 11 July 1911, he married Evelyn Maud Keppel (1887–1945), a descendant of the earls of Albemarle, at St Margaret's, Westminster. They had four children:

- Lieutenant Colonel Thomas William Arnold Anson, Viscount Anson (1913–1958); he married Anne Bowes-Lyon and had issue, including Patrick Anson, 5th Earl of Lichfield.
- Lady Betty Marjorie Anson (1917–2012); she married Colonel Thomas Foley Churchill Winnington (1910–1999) and had issue, including Sir Anthony Edward Winnington, 7th Baronet.
- Lieutenant The Honourable Edward John Anson (1919–1943); he died from an accident on duty while serving as a lieutenant in the Royal Navy.
- Lady Cecilia Evelyn Anson (1924–1963); she married Sir John Henry Wiggin, 4th Baronet and had issue.

After Evelyn's death in 1945, he married Violet Margaret Philips (née Dawson-Greene; 1899-1988) on 23 February 1949.

Lichfield died on 14 September 1960 in Bournemouth, Dorset, aged 76. Predeceased by his eldest son, his titles passed to his grandson Patrick who became 5th Earl of Lichfield and a celebrated society photographer. Shugborough Hall and its estate passed to the National Trust in lieu of death duties.

Peerage of the United Kingdom
Preceded by Thomas Francis Anson	Earl of Lichfield; 1918–1960	Succeeded by Thomas Patrick John Anson
