= Great Haywood =

Village in Staffordshire, England

- Village
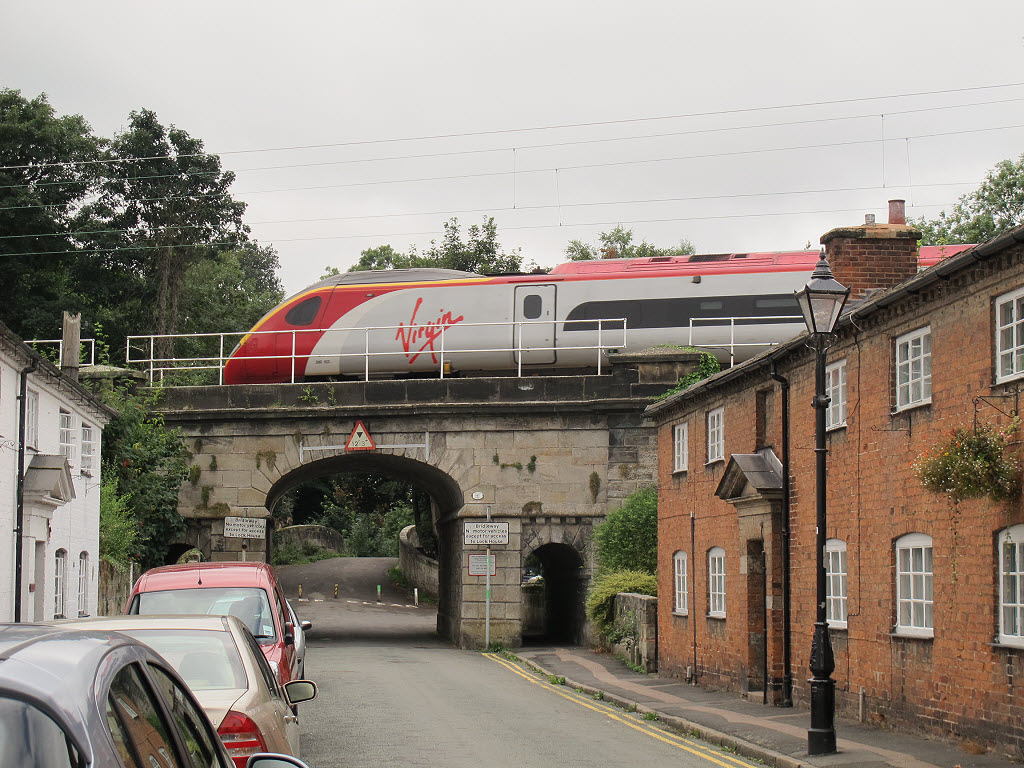
- Trent Lane, Great Haywood

- Location within Staffordshire
- OS grid reference: SJ997226
- Civil parish: Colwich
- District: Stafford
- Shire county: Staffordshire
- Region: West Midlands
- Country: England
- Sovereign state: United Kingdom
- Post town: STAFFORD
- Postcode district: ST18
- Dialling code: 01889
- Police: Staffordshire
- Fire: Staffordshire
- Ambulance: West Midlands
- UK Parliament: Stone, Great Wyrley and Penkridge

Great Haywood is a village in the civil parish of Colwich, in the Borough of Stafford in the county of Staffordshire, England, just off the A51 and about 5 miles (8.0 km) northwest of Rugeley and 7 miles (11 km) southeast of the town of Stafford.

== Geography ==
Haywood lies on the River Trent, where the Trent is met by its tributary, the River Sow. The village is also the site of a significant junction of the English inland canal network, Haywood Junction, where the Staffordshire and Worcestershire Canal meets the Trent and Mersey Canal. The waters around the village are widely regarded by guidebooks as some of the most attractive on the network.

== Amenities ==
There are two churches, each of which has an attached school. St. John's RC School was classed as 'Good' in their most recent Ofsted inspection, and Anson CE School was deemed to be 'Outstanding' in December 2011.

== St Stephen's Church ==
The Anglican parish church is dedicated to St Stephen. St Stephen's Church was designed by Thomas Trubshaw, and became the centre of a parish in 1854. The 2nd, 3rd and 4th Earl of Lichfield and other members of the Anson family of Shugborough Hall are buried in the churchyard of St Stephen's. The church is grade II listed.

== St John's Church ==
The Catholic church in Great Haywood is dedicated to St John the Baptist. It was originally built in Tixall, about three miles (5 km) away, as a private chapel to Tixall Hall, which was owned by the Aston family. When the estate was sold to Earl Talbot, the church was dismantled and rebuilt with a few alterations in Great Haywood. The marks made on the blocks to allow reassembly can still be seen inside the church. The church is grade II listed, and has been described as "a striking example of physical continuity between country house Catholicism and a nineteenth century parish".

== Industry ==
There was originally a mill and a brewery in the village, but both have been closed down and demolished, commemorated by the names of the roads where they once stood (Mill Lane and Brewery Lane). Following a fatal automobile accident in 1905, the mill pond was drained and the road straightened.

== Notable people ==
- Samuel Peploe Wood (1827–1873) was an English sculptor and painter who was born in the village. He undertook work on many Staffordshire buildings, including the reredos at All Angels' Church, Colwich; corbels and bosses at St. Stephen's Church, Great Haywood and an oak lectern for Stowe by Lichfield.
- The village was home to the newly married Edith Tolkien, wife of famous author J. R. R. Tolkien, from March 1916 to February 1917. She moved to the village to be close to his camp on Cannock Chase. J. R. R. Tolkien himself lived in Great Haywood in the winter of 1916–17.

== Transport ==
Chaserider bus service 828 and 828A links Great Haywood with Stafford and Lichfield on a half hourly basis Monday to Saturday daytimes and hourly evening and Sundays. The Stone to Colwich railway line passes through Great Haywood, and the village was served by a railway station which was opened by the North Staffordshire Railway on 6 June 1887 and closed in 1957. The Great Haywood bypass opened 24 April 1964.

== Hermit 2002 ==
In August 2002, advertisements were placed in the national press for a "hermit" to make a public appearance for two days on the Great Haywood Cliffs above the nearby Shugborough estate, ancestral home of Lord Lichfield. Fifty-five people applied, and Ansuman Biswas was chosen as hermit. Shugborough also serves as the headquarters of Staffordshire's arts management team.

== Essex Bridge ==
Great Haywood is the site of Essex Bridge, one of the largest surviving packhorse bridges in the country which stands over the River Trent near Shugborough Hall. It borders Cannock Chase, designated an area of outstanding natural beauty since 1958.

== See also ==
- Listed buildings in Colwich, Staffordshire
