= Taxonomy of Pachypodium =

The taxonomy of the Pachypodium genus is the study of the species and subspecies in the genus Pachypodium. There are currently 25 recognized species in the genus, of which 17 are shrubs and eight are trees.

== Species ==
Species included in the genus Pachypodium are as follows:

- Pachypodium ambongense: [Madagascar, shrub]
- Pachypodium baronii: [Madagascar, shrub]
- Pachypodium bicolor: [Madagascar, shrub]
- Pachypodium bispinosum: [Southern Continental Africa, shrub]
- Pachypodium brevicaule: [Madagascar, shrub]
- Pachypodium cactipes: [Madagascar, shrub]
- Pachypodium decaryi: [Madagascar, shrub]
- Pachypodium densiflorum; Baker [Madagascar, shrub]
- Pachypodium brevicalyx or P. densiflorum var. brevicalyx
- Pachypodium eburneum: [Madagascar, shrub]
- Pachypodium geayi: [Madagascar, tree]
- Pachypodium gracilius: [Madagascar, shrub]
- Pachypodium horombense: [Madagascar, shrub]
- Pachypodium inopinatum: [Madagascar, shrub]
- Pachypodium lamerei (Madagascar palm): [Madagascar, tree]
- Pachypodium ramosum: A synonym for P. lamere
- Pachypodium lealii (Bottle tree): [Southern Continental Africa, tree]
- Pachypodium makayense: [Madagascar, shrub]
- Pachypodium menabeum: [Madagascar, tree]
- Pachypodium meridionale: [Madagascar, tree]
- Pachypodium namaquanum (Coba's tree): [Southern Continental Africa, tree]
- Pachypodium rosulatum: [Madagascar, shrub]
- Pachypodium rutenbergianum: [Madagascar, tree]
- Pachypodium saundersii: [Southern Continental Africa, shrub]
- Pachypodium sofiense: [Madagascar, tree]
- Pachypodium succulentum: [Southern Continental Africa, Shrub]
- Pachypodium windsorii: [Madagascar, Shrub]
