= Morphology of Pachypodium =

Physical features of plant genus Pachypodium

Plants belonging to the genus Pachypodium vary widely from each other in some aspects, but also share a number of basic common traits. Each species is adapted to the specific environment which it inhabits, but all species of the genus share certain anatomical and metabolic traits, reflecting their common evolutionary ancestry.

Pachypodium species vary widely in general form, or habit. The genus contains species ranging from the bottle-shaped P. baronii to the cigar-like P. lamerei to the branchless dwarf species P. brevicaule. Most species, however, are shrub or tree-like, ranging in height from 5 m or less to as much as 12 m. All species except for P. decaryi have spines on their branchlets, which are a modified form of stipule; some species have spines in other locations as well. In African species, the spines are clustered in groups of three, two large spines and one small one in the middle. In other species, the spines come in groups of two. The length of the spines varies from 1 mm in P. decaryi and P. sofiense to 75 mm in P. namaquanum.

The wood of Pachypodium species is soft and cream-colored; their bark is, on average, 6 mm thick, and often smooth. It ranges in color from dark brown to pale grey to green-grey. In cross section, it is usually green in color.

The leaves may be either sessile—growing directly from the stem—or petiolate—growing from a leaf-stalk. They are typically confined to the apices of branchlets, branches, or the trunk. In most species, leaves range from slightly hairy to smooth on top and densely hairy to smooth beneath. Leaf shape varies, but, in all but one species, upcurving secondary veins are apparent.

Pachypodium inflorescences appear either at the end of the stem, growing directly off the stem, or attached to the stem by branchlets. The bracts surrounding the inflorescence resemble sepals. Flower stalks range in length from 0 to 56 mm.

Pachypodium flowers always have five sepals, and range in shape from ovate to oblong. The flower is tubular, sometimes narrowing at the top, and varies in color; various shades of red, white, and yellow appear in different species. A hairy belt of varying width appears above the stamens. The tube of the flower varies in length from 9 to 60 mm across the genus. The ovary of the flower is composed of two carpels, each containing numerous ovules. All but two species in the genus have stamens within the flower. When pollinated, the flower produces a pale to dark brown fruit composed of two separate mericarps, which is whitish to pale brown inside when dried. The seeds are pale to medium brown, with a lighter spot on their apex.

All Pachypodium species share certain basic characteristics; they use enlarged, spine protected trunks for water storage, enabling them to inhabit dry microenvironments. There is, however, substantial variation on these basic characteristics, and no single shape or pattern of branching is shared by the entire genus. In general, branching is flexible even within a species, allowing each individual specimen to develop as best suits its microenvironment. This adaptability allows Pachypodium species to occupy marginal microenvironments which provide only limited means of survival.

== External sources ==
- Rapanarivo, S.H.J.V.; Lavranos, J.J.; Leeuwenberg, A.J.M.; AND Röösli, W. Pachypodium (Apocynaceae) Taxonomy, habitats, cultivation. "Taxonomic revision of the genus Pachypodium" S.H.J.V. Rapanarivo & A.J.M. Leeuwenberg; "The habitats of Pachypodium species" S.H.J.V. Rapanarivo; "Cultivation" W. Röösli. (A.A. Balkema: Rotterdam, Brookfield; 1999)
