= History of Pachypodium =

The history of the genus Pachypodium as a scientific classification began in 1830, when the genus was first used in a taxonomical system by John D. Lindley, who placed a single species, P. tuberosum, in it. Lindley believed that this species was identical with one identified in 1781 as Echites succulenta, which would make "Pachypodium" a taxonomical synonym of "Echites".

Lindley's new genus did not immediately gain broad acceptance; in 1937, George Don gave precedence to the genus Echites in naming two species that had been classified in both that genus and Pachypodium; he assigned only one species, P. tomentosum, to Pachypodium. In 1844, however, Alphonse Pyrame de Candolle placed several species in the genus. More were added in 1867 and 1871, when P. namaguanum and P. lealii, respectively, were added.

In 1882, John Gilbert Baker identified the first species of the genus from Madagascar, P. rosulatum. Several more species from Madagascar followed shortly afterwards.

The first monograph on Pachypodium was published in 1907 by Julien Constantin and Georges Bois. It listed 17 species in the genus, 10 from Madagascar and 7 from central Africa. 20 species were listed in 1934, of which 14 were from Madagascar and only 6 from central Africa. By 1976, the number had returned to 17, with 12 of those being from Madagascar and 5 from central Africa.

Several new species were added in the 1990s, and several classifications previously reduced to synonym or subspecies were elevated to the status of distinct species.
