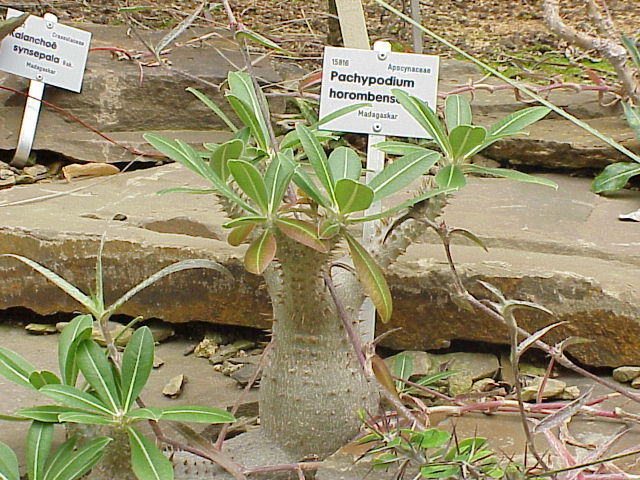

Scientific classification
- Kingdom: Plantae
- Clade: Tracheophytes
- Clade: Angiosperms
- Clade: Eudicots
- Clade: Asterids
- Order: Gentianales
- Family: Apocynaceae
- Genus: Pachypodium
- Species: P. horombense

Binomial name
- Pachypodium horombense H.Poisson

= Pachypodium horombense =

Species of plant

Pachypodium horombense is a species of Pachypodium endemic to Madagascar. The plant trunk is pachycaul, and typically short and fat. It produces large, campanulate, yellow flowers.

== Synonymy ==
The species was formally known as:

- Pachypodium rosulatum var. horombense

It is now considered a species in section Densiflora as the floral morphology is significantly different from related species.
