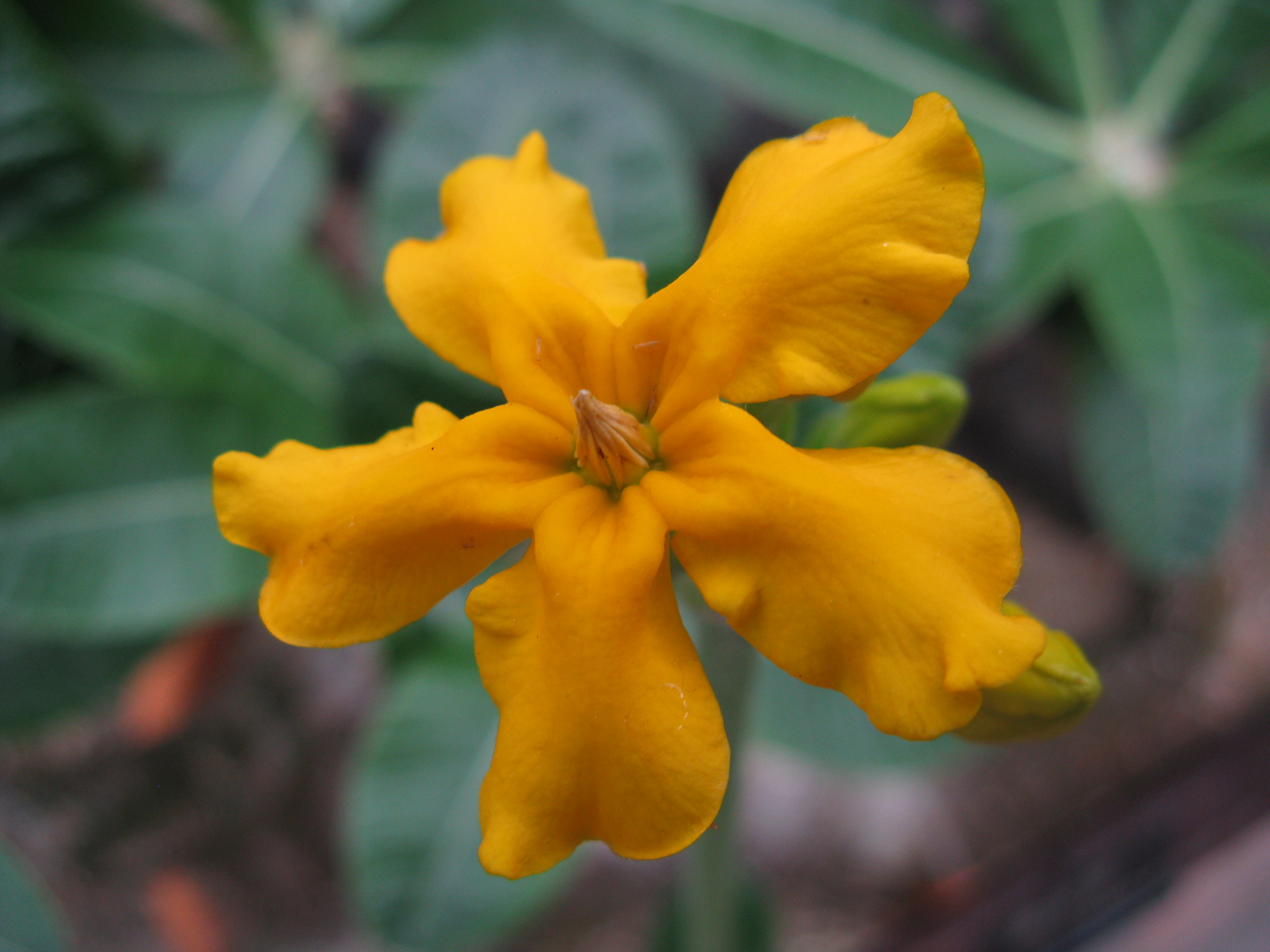

Scientific classification
- Kingdom: Plantae
- Clade: Tracheophytes
- Clade: Angiosperms
- Clade: Eudicots
- Clade: Asterids
- Order: Gentianales
- Family: Apocynaceae
- Genus: Pachypodium
- Species: P. densiflorum

Binomial name
- Pachypodium densiflorum Baker

Synonyms
- Pachypodium brevicalyx (H.Perrier) Pichon

= Pachypodium densiflorum =

Species of flowering plant

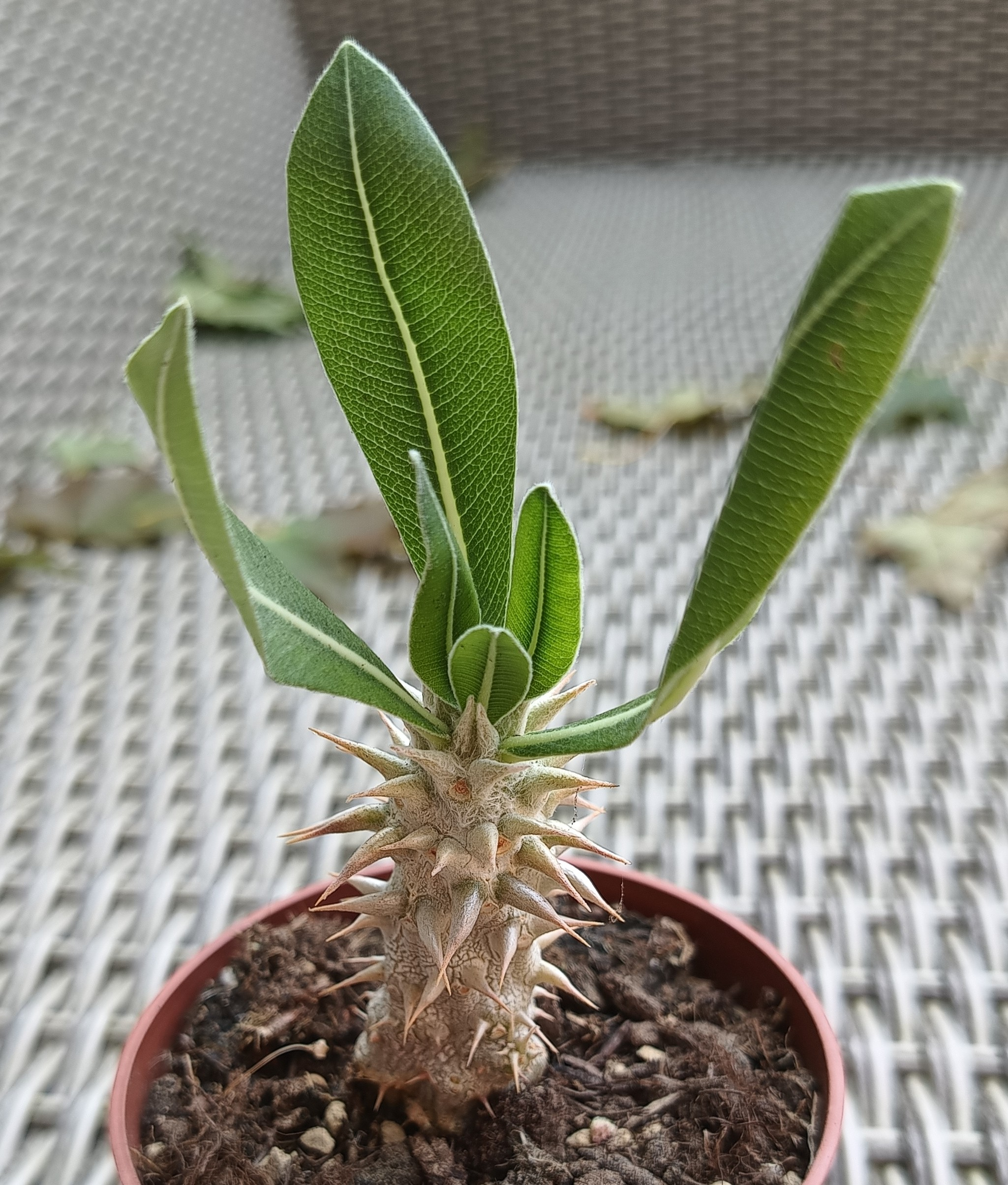
A young Pachypodium densiflorum.

Pachypodium densiflorum is a species of flowering plant in the Apocynaceae family. It is native to Madagascar. In habitat, it grows on granite rocks in the central plateau of Madagascar.

== Description ==
Pachypodium densiflorum grows from a sizeable, fleshy basal caudex. Shoots growing from the caudex are regularly branched and spiny at the youngest parts. Leaves appear at the top of these shoots during vegetation periods and are lanceolate and deep green. The flowers are yellow and appear on long peduncles.
