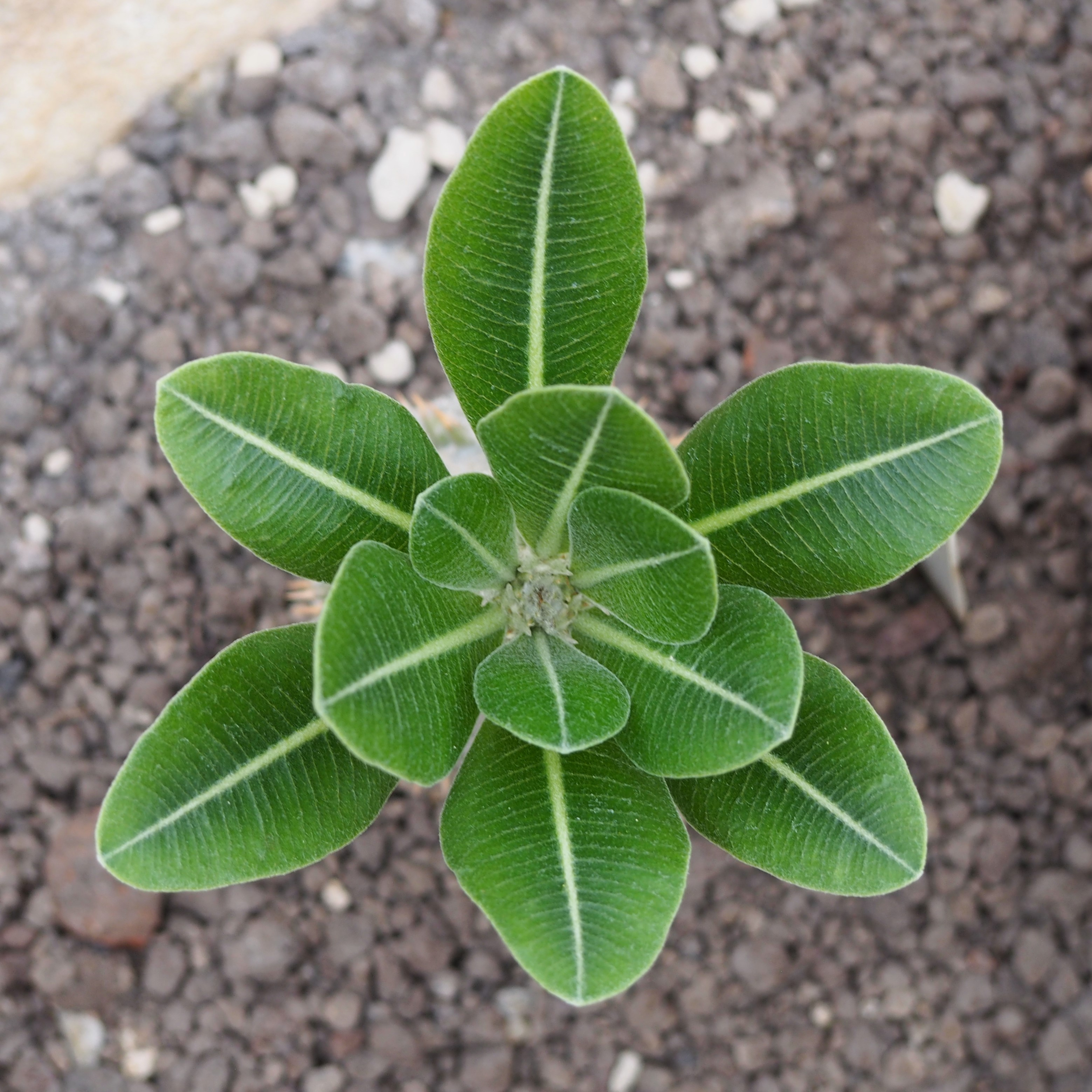

Conservation status
- Critically Endangered (IUCN 3.1)

Scientific classification
- Kingdom: Plantae
- Clade: Tracheophytes
- Clade: Angiosperms
- Clade: Eudicots
- Clade: Asterids
- Order: Gentianales
- Family: Apocynaceae
- Genus: Pachypodium
- Species: P. eburneum

Binomial name
- Pachypodium eburneum Alfred

= Pachypodium eburneum =

Isalo palm

Species of flowering plant

Pachypodium eburneum, also called Isalo palm, is a species of Pachypodium.
