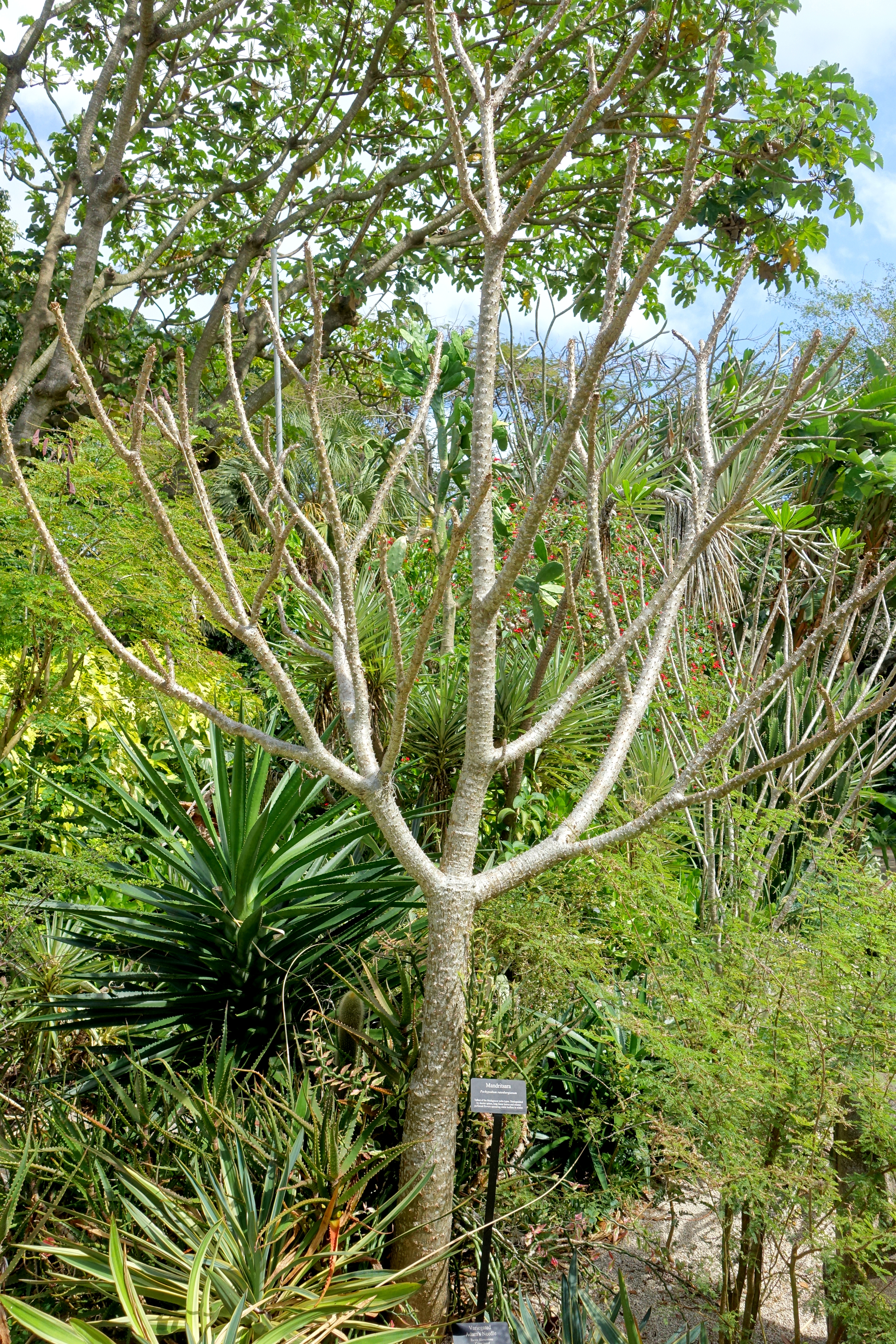

Conservation status
- Least Concern (IUCN 3.1)

Scientific classification
- Kingdom: Plantae
- Clade: Tracheophytes
- Clade: Angiosperms
- Clade: Eudicots
- Clade: Asterids
- Order: Gentianales
- Family: Apocynaceae
- Genus: Pachypodium
- Species: P. rutenbergianum

Binomial name
- Pachypodium rutenbergianum Vatke

= Pachypodium rutenbergianum =

Species of flowering plant

Pachypodium rutenbergianum is a species of Pachypodium native to Madagascar. The plant can reach 3 to 8 m high, and its trunk up to 60 cm in diameter at base. The plant has short branches and 1-cm long spines. Leaves are green and 10 to 15 cm long, 4 cm wide. Its flowers are white.

== Varieties ==
- Pachypodium rutenbergianum var. meridionale
- Pachypodium rutenbergianum var. rutenbergianum
- Pachypodium rutenbergianum var. sofiense

Each of these are considered by many botanists as separate species.
