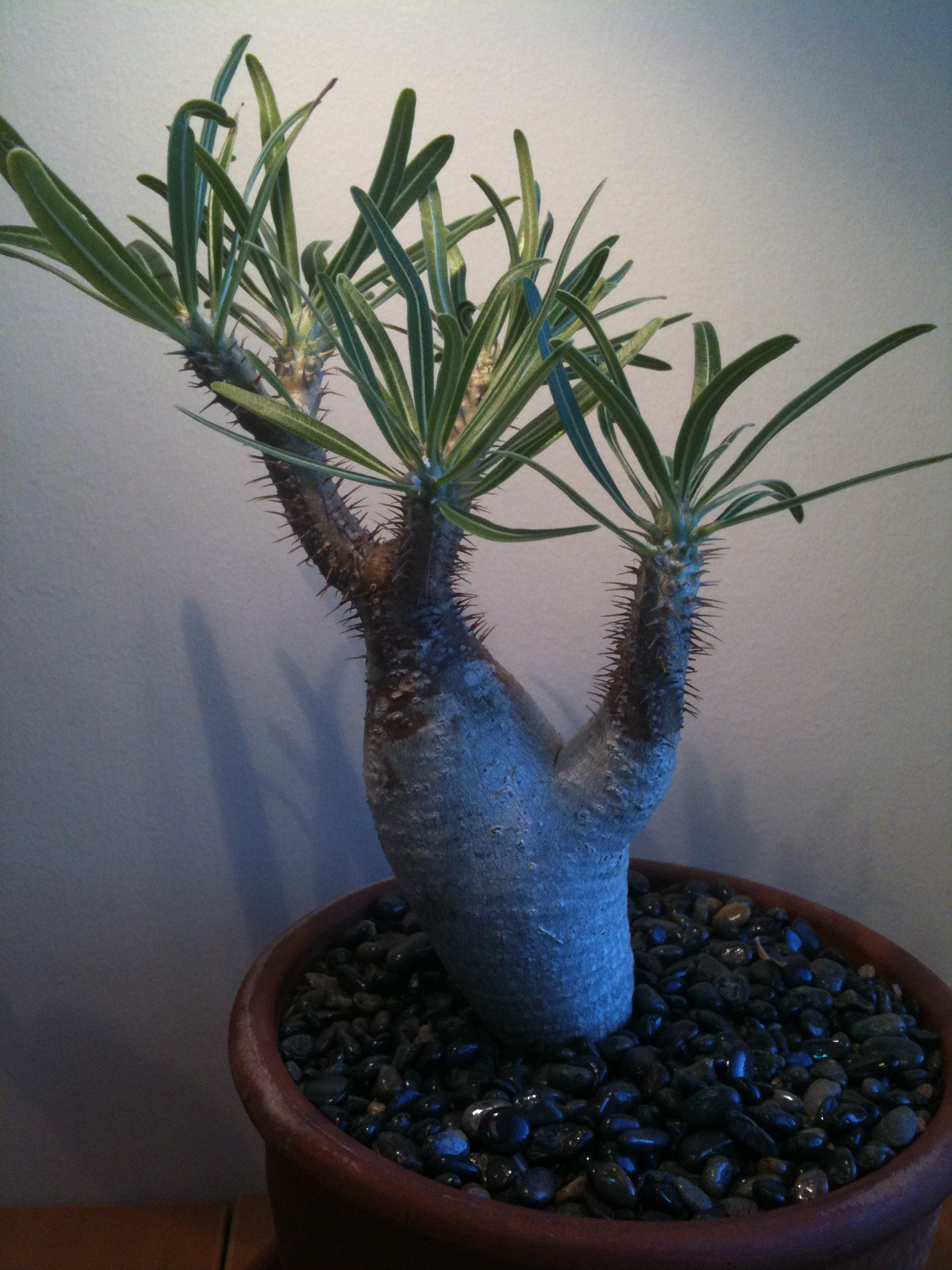

Scientific classification
- Kingdom: Plantae
- Clade: Tracheophytes
- Clade: Angiosperms
- Clade: Eudicots
- Clade: Asterids
- Order: Gentianales
- Family: Apocynaceae
- Genus: Pachypodium
- Species: P. gracilius

Binomial name
- Pachypodium gracilius H.Poisson

= Pachypodium gracilius =

Species of plant

Pachypodium gracilius is a species of Pachypodium endemic to Madagascar. The plant trunk is pachycaul, and typically short and fat. It produces yellow flowers.

== Synonymy ==
Recent revision of this taxon consider it as a subspecies of Pachypodium rosulatum:

- Pachypodium rosulatum subsp. gracilius
