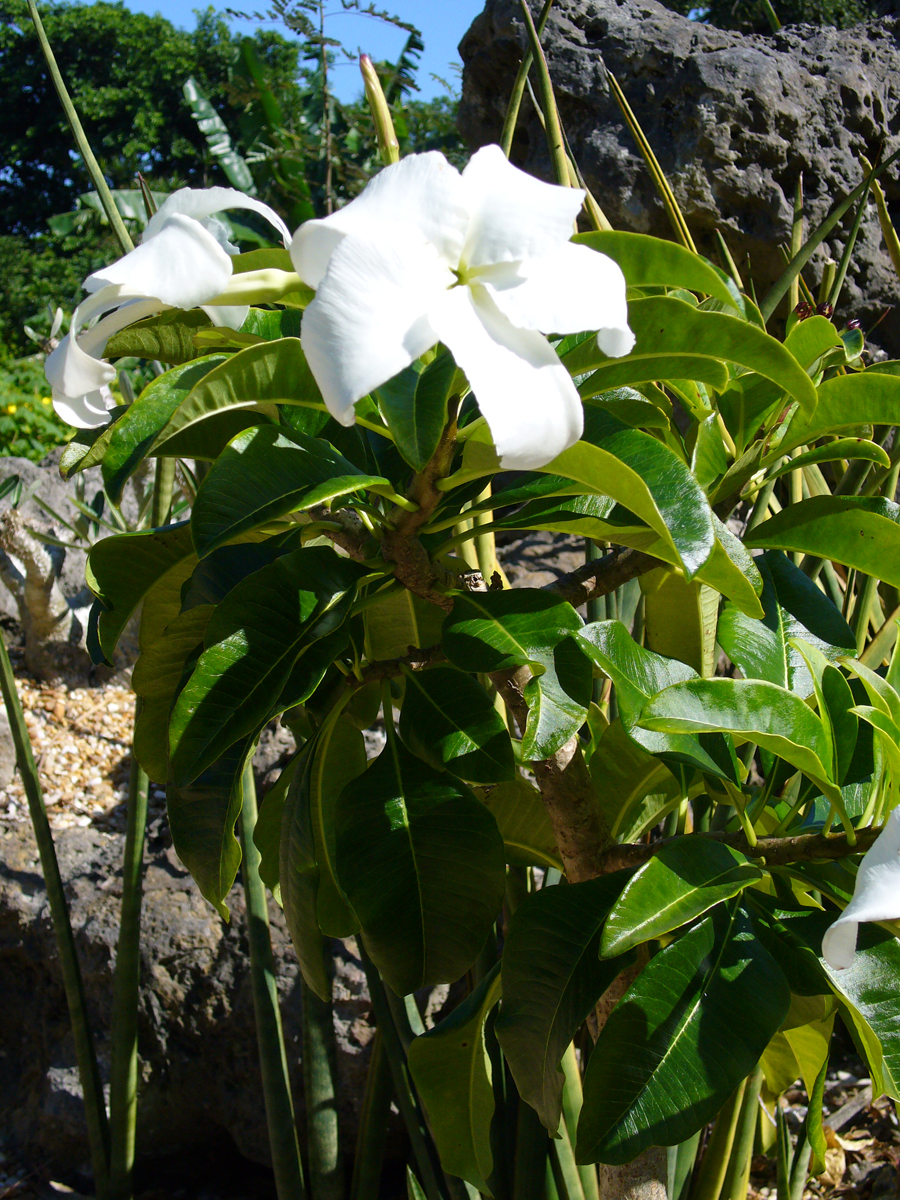

Conservation status
- CITES Appendix I (CITES)

Scientific classification
- Kingdom: Plantae
- Clade: Tracheophytes
- Clade: Angiosperms
- Clade: Eudicots
- Clade: Asterids
- Order: Gentianales
- Family: Apocynaceae
- Genus: Pachypodium
- Species: P. decaryi

Binomial name
- Pachypodium decaryi Costantin & Bois

= Pachypodium decaryi =

Species of flowering plant

Pachypodium decaryi is a flowering plant, and a member of the family Apocynaceae. This species was first described in 1922 by Henri Louis Poisson. It is native to central Madagascar, growing on bare rocks with little water and a lot of sunlight. The caudex (swollen stem base) of this species can grow to 40 centimetres in diameter, and the taller stems can grow up to three or four meters. It blooms with white flowers.
