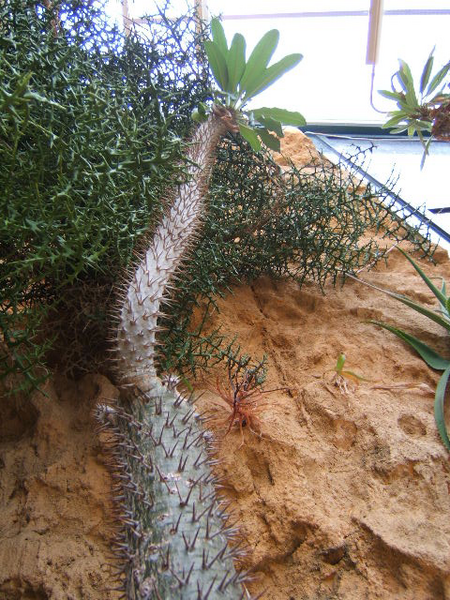
- The pachycaul trunk of Pachypodium lamerei (growing beside Euphorbia stenoclada)

Scientific classification
- Kingdom: Plantae
- Clade: Embryophytes
- Clade: Tracheophytes
- Clade: Angiosperms
- Clade: Eudicots
- Clade: Asterids
- Order: Gentianales
- Family: Apocynaceae
- Subfamily: Apocynoideae
- Tribe: Malouetieae
- Genus: Pachypodium; Lindl.

Species
- Pachypodium ambongense Pachypodium baronii Pachypodium bicolor Pachypodium bispinosum Pachypodium brevicaule Pachypodium cactipes Pachypodium decaryi Pachypodium densiflorum Pachypodium eburneum Pachypodium enigmaticum Pachypodium geayi Pachypodium gracilius Pachypodium horombense Pachypodium inopinatum Pachypodium lamerei Pachypodium lealii Pachypodium makayense Pachypodium meridionale Pachypodium menabeum Pachypodium mikea Pachypodium namaquanum Pachypodium rosulatum Pachypodium rutenbergianum Pachypodium saundersii Pachypodium sofiense Pachypodium succulentum Pachypodium windsorii

Synonyms
- Belonites E.Mey.

= Pachypodium =

Genus of succulents

Pachypodium is a genus of succulent spine-bearing trees and shrubs, native to Madagascar and Africa. It belongs to the family Apocynaceae.

== Genus characteristics ==
All Pachypodium are succulent plants that exhibit, to varying degrees, the morphological characteristics of pachycaul trunks and spinescence. These are the most general features of the genus and can be considered distinguishing characteristics.

The pachycaul trunk is a morphologically enlarged trunk that stores water so as to survive seasonal drought or intermittent periods of root desiccation in exposed, dry, and rocky conditions. Whereas there is great variation in the habit of the plant body, all Pachypodium exhibit pachycaul growth. Variation in habit can range from dwarf flattened plants to bottle shaped shrubs to dendroid-shaped trees.

The second general characteristic of Pachypodium is spinescence, or having spines. The spines come clustered in either pairs or triplets with these clusters often arranged in rings or whorls around the trunk. Spines emerge with leaves, and like leaves grow for a short period before stopping growth and hardening. Spines do not regenerate so weathering and abrasion can wear away all but the youngest spines from older specimens - leaving smooth trunks and branches.

To some extent, branches are a characteristic of the genus. Some caution is warranted in overgeneralizing this characteristic. Pachypodium namaquanum is often branchless. Pachypodium brevicaule has no clear branches, and indeed may have evolved an alternative to branching in the form of nodes from which leaves, spines, and inflorescences emerge. In general Pachypodium have few branches. Since the environmental stresses and factors that contribute to branching can vary widely even in small areas, individual plants of the same species exhibit wide variation in branching morphology.

Unlike many members of the Apocynaceae, including some members of the superficially similar Adenium, Pachypodium species do not exude a milky latex. Rather, the sap is always clear.

=== Morphology ===
The morphology of the genus Pachypodium varies significantly both within and between species and is highly responsive to its immediate surrounding microenvironment. Pachypodium do not overly respond morphologically to larger vegetative zones. For example, Pachypodium can sometimes occur in prehumid vegetative zones where a taxon might find a suitable habitat on a rocky, sunny inselberg jutting above the humid canopy of the forest.

Morphologically, Pachypodium can be highly flexible in organization. Branching, if present at all, can be from either the base of the plant or at the crown. Freeform branching is a morphological adaptation to factors of the immediate microenvironment which, by their diversity, account for the wide range of habits:

- flattened dwarf species less than 8 cm tall but reaching 40 cm in diameter
- bottle- or oval-shaped shrubs to 4 m tall
- both branching and unbranched cigar- and cactus-like trees to 5 m tall.

Despite microenvironmental variation, Pachypodium are always succulent and always exhibit pachycaul trunks. Pachypodium are usually spinescent, but individual variation in spinescence as well as weathering and abrasion can result in plants with few if any spines.

=== Adaptive features ===
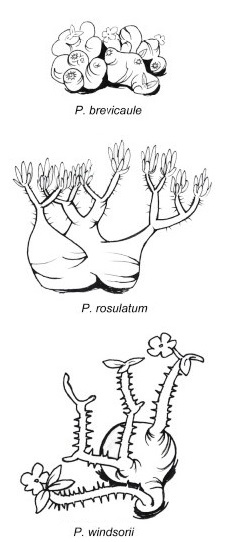
Habit of three Malagasy species

Variation among Pachypodium species is significant but all Pachypodium are succulent plants inhabiting seasonally or chronically dry landscapes. The genus employs two morphological adaptations to these xeric, isolated, habitats: Pachycaul trunks and spinescence.

==== Pachycaul trunks ====
Pachypodium trunks and branches are thickened with water-storing tissue. Plants must rely on the food and water stored in their thickened trunks during seasonal or intermittent drought when leaves have been shed and no water is available from the substrate. In addition to the lower surface-to-volume ratio which aides in water retention, the thickened trunks and branches can also possess photosynthetic surface tissue to allow nutrient synthesis even when leaves are not present.

Some species of pachypodium have developed geophytic pachycaul trunks, or trunks that are beneath the soil's surface. These geophytic trunks are caudexes, enlarged stems or trunks that store water. They should not be mistaken for roots, because the enlargement occurs above the point where the roots branch off the main axis of the trunk.

==== Spinescence ====
The various species of Pachypodium are more or less heavily spined. Species from more arid regions have evolved denser and longer spines. Fog condenses on their spines in the form of dew, which drips down to the ground and increases the amount of moisture that's available to their often shallow roots.

The concept of "micro-endemism" plays an important role in this relationship between adaptation mechanisms and speciation. It suggests a certain small scale "nativeness" by virtue of originating or occurring naturally in a particular place or location. The landscape of Madagascar is a perfect example of "micro-endemism" for species of Pachypodium and other taxa. Three factors can be seen to attribute speciation, or the occurrence of species diversity, via adaptive mechanisms to accelerated evolution as it occurs within the xeric landscape and climate.

(1) The variation of geology and topology in dry climates is thought to have a greater effect upon plants than in areas with high rainfall. Xeric environments are thus more demanding of adaptive mechanisms to aid in the plant's survival than in places where rainfall is plentiful. The more the demanding, generally the more "mechanized" or "mechanisms" are needed to aid the plants' survival.

(2) The geological formations of locally xeric landscapes break up populations of organisms, i.e. plants, into smaller groups, where each group can initially interbreed but, with time, develop new genotypes and cannot be bred with exception to natural hybridization. Localized geology becomes harder to cross over for a given population to be "continuous" in a xeric geological landscape, because more demands are placed on the population. Therefore, populations are broken down into smaller units within this landscape. Groups of the original population become located to unique microenvironments within the landscape. Accordingly, measures to adapt to these microenvironments become more singular to the isolated habitat. Adaptive mechanisms are employed so as to aid the survival of the plant group. This adaptation eventually, in part, leads to speciation in the habitat, or diverse species across the spectrum of the landscape.

(3) Taxa tend to develop specialized xeromorphoric structures at some architectural level in arid, geological and topological landscapes, where a strategy of a "flexible" and "strict" architectural, organizational morphology at various levels of structure for Pachypodium becomes advantageous to succeeding in the isolated, specialized landscape. This strategy is seen in the manifest flexible variations of habit in species of Pachypodium while all the same they are "strictly" xeromorphic pachycaul trunks meant to conserve water for dry periods. At another level of structure, namely that of organs, we can see that dew and fog dripping spines are examples of a xeromorphic adaptive mechanized organ responding to microenvironments.

These newly created species from within the xeromorphic landscape take on different characters as responses to the habitat. For instance, there is an advantage to morphologically developing into bottle-shaped "shrubs" where the plants exist in open, sunny microenvironments on top of porous sandstone. Little competition exists for height within the habitat. Likewise, where competition for resources is more competitive—both in the number of species and the height of surrounding plants—there are times when it is to the advantage of a plant to develop into arborescent, dendroid "trees." This development is because these particular Pachypodium must compete with other plants for resources in a dry deciduous forest, composed of, perhaps, arborescent Aloe, members of the Didiereaceae genera Alluaudia, Alluaudiopsis, Decaryia, and Didierea (all endemic to Madagascar), and Uncarina species, for instance.

The adaptive mechanism in a morphological form and an ecological response to habitats are typically manifested together at once for the genus Pachypodium.

Examining Pachypodium reveals characteristics of various organs that adapt to the microenvironment. These adaptations, variations on habit, trunks, branches, branchlets, spines, leaves, or flowers, are plentiful in demonstrating how Pachypodium as a genus fosters greater variation in its speciation. The manner in which speciation occurs in Pachypodium, therefore, is apparent: adaptive mechanisms on a morphological level respond to the microenvironment of Pachypodium habitat. The genus' unique organizational, architectural morphology shapes plants that are highly, adaptively responsive to their immediate, surrounding, microenvironments. The duplicity of an adaptive mechanism that is at once "strict" and "flexible" at differing levels of plant physiology, or structure, has granted Pachypodium the ability to evolve within the landscape into variations that fulfill an ecological niche as various species.

The hypothesis of micro-endemism, therefore, states that speciation occurs in small specific habitats as aided by adaptive mechanism occurring in geological, topographical, and climatic isolation. Geologically and topographically, plant populations in xeric climates are broken down into smaller groups. The microclimate responds to the given location transforming it into a habitat. Isolated, the duplicity of organization in Pachypodium form through geology and location significant variation where over evolutionary time a new species might develop, if not have developed. The development of new species is through, in part, the adaptive mechanisms of pachycaul and spinescence as well as strict and flexible structural organization at various levels of plant physiology.

== Taxonomy ==
=== Number of species ===
There are now 25 known species, of which 20 come from Madagascar, where isolated landscapes and micro-environmental conditions have produced highly specialized species. The species count continues to grow as Pachypodium menabeum has been resurrected from invalid taxonomy and Pachypodium makayense added newly to the list. One can speculate that in regions such as Madagascar, there might still be unidentified species that are confined to a single rocky outcrop or an inselberg.

=== Affinities within the Apocynaceae ===
The family Apocynaceae before it included Asclepiadaceae had 3 genera that can be considered succulent plants: Adenium, Pachypodium, and Plumeria. The first two genera (Pachypodium and Adenium) are generally assumed to have a close association with each other. Studies; however, of these two genera reveal that they are not as intimately close as once thought.

However, a study of key characteristics of the taxon and a cladistic study of the subfamily Apocynoideae and the family Asclepiadaceae (before its merging with the Apocynaceae), demonstrates that this closed association is not warranted. True, both are succulent plants and pachycaul. According to Leeuwenberg however, Adenium is maintained in the subtribe Neriinae, placed underneath the tribe Wrightieae whereas Pachypodium is placed beside them in the subtribe Pachypodiinae, within the tribe Echiteae. Though related, these taxa means that the two are not intimately related.

== Distribution and habitats ==
=== Distribution ===
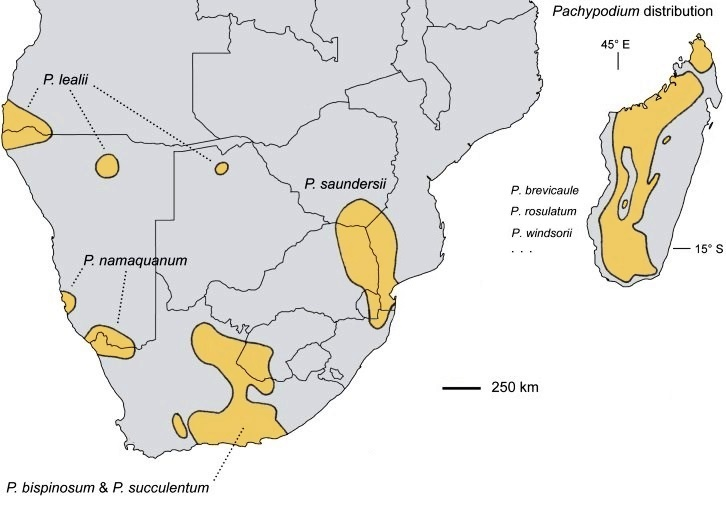
native range of genus Pachypodium

Pachypodium are native to Madagascar and continental Southern Africa, including Angola, Eswatini, Mozambique, Namibia, South Africa and Zimbabwe.

=== Habitat ===
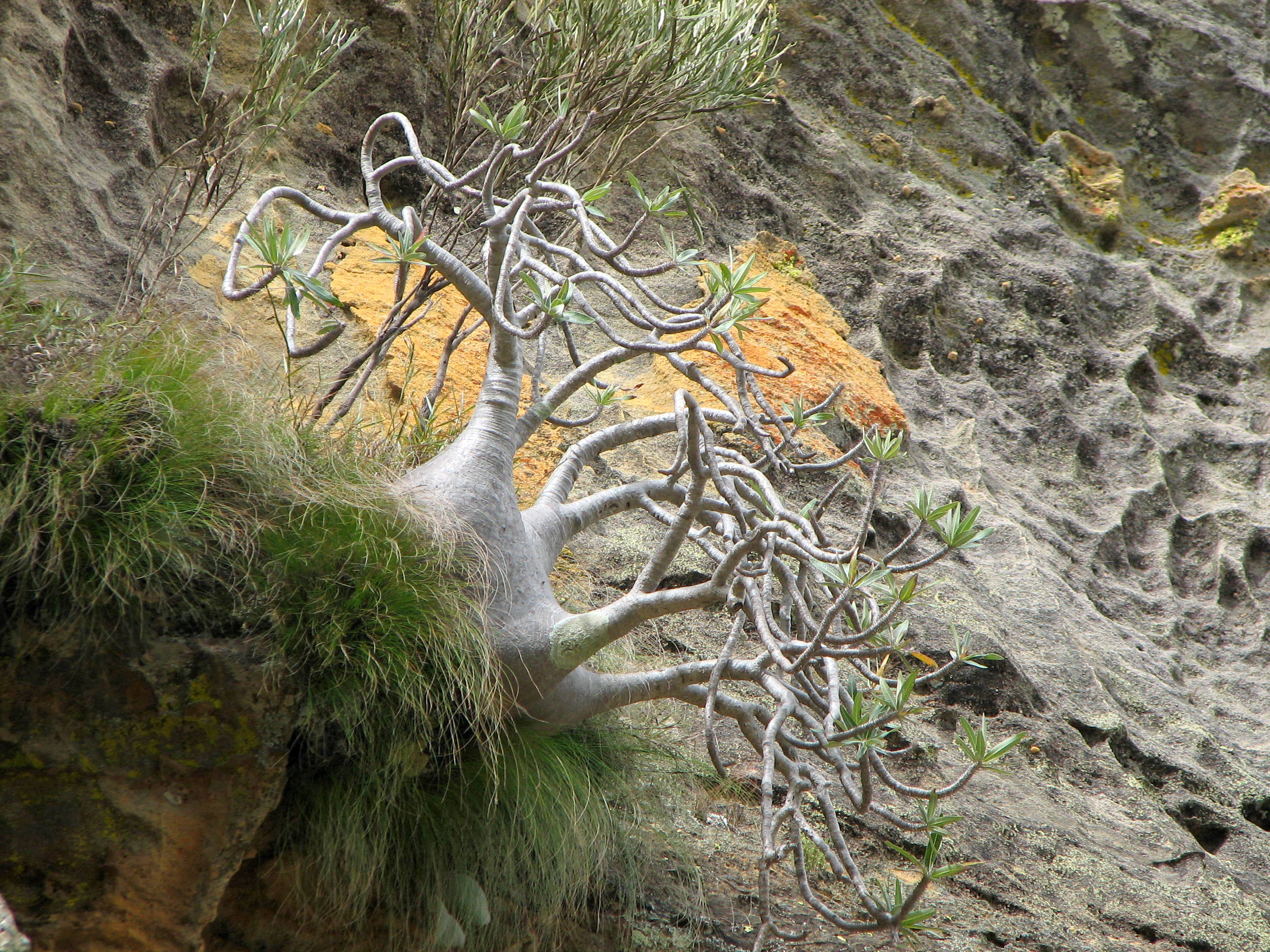
P. gracilius at Isalo National Park in Madagascar

Pachypodium in both mainland Africa and Madagascar grow at a wide variety of altitudes. They range from sea level—where some species, such as P. geayi, grow in sand dunes—to 1,600 m (5,200 ft) in the case of Pachypodium lealii in southern Africa and 1,900 m (6,200 ft) in the case Pachypodium brevicaule in Madagascar.

In continental southern Africa, the extreme temperatures range from −10 °C (14 °F) in some locations to as high as 45 °C (113 °F), whereas in Madagascar, the temperature ranges from −6 to 40 °C (21 to 104 °F).

A generalization about precipitation regimes for both southern Africa and Madagascar does not have much meaning because the habitats of Pachypodium vary so greatly in moisture regime. In some places in southern Africa, Pachypodium receive as little as 75 mm (3.0 in) of annual precipitation, while in others they receive as much as 1,985 mm (78.1 in). A precipitation regime for a species of Pachypodium, therefore, depends upon a habitat's location relative to the influences of the Atlantic and Indian Oceans and the various mountain ranges of southern continental Africa and of Madagascar.

The genus grows in areas where there are significant dry seasons that range from five to ten months. For example, they are common in the Madagascar dry deciduous forests with their long dry season and severe limestone ridden soils.

Pachypodium grows in various types of substrates. Some species only grow in one substrate whereas other will grow in several. The degree to which a taxon can grow in a given substrate seems to determine how specialized its habitat is within the landscape and climates. On outcrops, steep hills, and inselbergs, the plants are subjected to fluctuating moisture, high winds, and temperature extremes. Only plants with special adaptations to exposure and extreme drought can survive, let alone thrive, on these exposed geological habitats. Pachypodium root in cleft, fissures, and crevices of those rocky formations. The non-succulent roots penetrate deeply into the accumulated soil, mineral, and humus in these crevices. Moisture is able to seep deep into these crevices. Very little transpiration occurs. In this manner, rocky substrates provide moisture in the habitat. This saturation of crevices can only occur, however, if there is not a considerable runoff from the rock's surface and if there is abundant fine soil in the cracks that, in turn, retain water. The substrate, therefore, plays a critical role in the creation of micro-environmental "arid islands."

Sand readily store water because it is taken up easily and there is less evaporation except for the top layer. Very deep sand; however, has the problem of seepage. Yet in moderation shallow and deep sand substrates have water available to Pachypodium. With shallow sand substrates, Pachypodium grow on sand dunes near the sea. Where water is in deep sandy substrate, Pachypodium grow on sand "over" laterite red soil. Laterite soil is a largely impermeable soil that traps water for the use of the flora that include Pachypodium.

== Protection status ==
Internationally Pachypodium are protected under the CITES treaty. According to it, members of this genus cannot be collected from endemic, native locations within the landscape. They are not easily, readily imported and exported between nations either. The protection afforded by the CITES treaty responses to two issues:

- The esteem the genus has within Collector's and Nursery Trade. As highly esteemed plants, succulent enthusiast desire to collect more and more species and cultivars. In the case of Pachypodium, seed, seedlings, and even mature, nursery-grown specimen plants are fortunately available readily in Nursery Trade.
- Destruction of the genus's endemic habitats, e.g. through agriculture.

Extinction of identified species seems yet unlikely, as the collection of seed and the cultivation of the plant safeguard the genus.

== History of the genus ==
The early history of the genus Pachypodium demonstrates the typical process of a taxon becoming a new genus. Initially debate occurred over if Pachypodium belonged to the genus Echites or if it constituted a separate genus. Pachypodium were first published as a unique genus, separate from Echites, by Leandley in 1830.

Then the debate centered on the nomenclature of species uniquely found in continental Southern Africa. That changed when, in 1882, Baker contributed the first species accepted into the genus from Madagascar. The degree of speciation then turned to Madagascar, where the count of species far exceeds those on the mainland.

In 1907, Costantin and Bois constructed the first monograph, of Pachypodium, in which they enumerated 17 species, where ten were from Madagascar and seven were from continental southern Africa.

== Natural history ==
There is no fossil records of Pachypodium known. Yet certain conclusions can be drawn from the geology of the landscape in Madagascar as to the past natural history of Pachypodium.

== Vernacular names ==
In southern Africa it is called the Kudu Lily. In Madagascar, they are known as bontaka, vontaka and votaka which means "swelling".

== Gallery ==
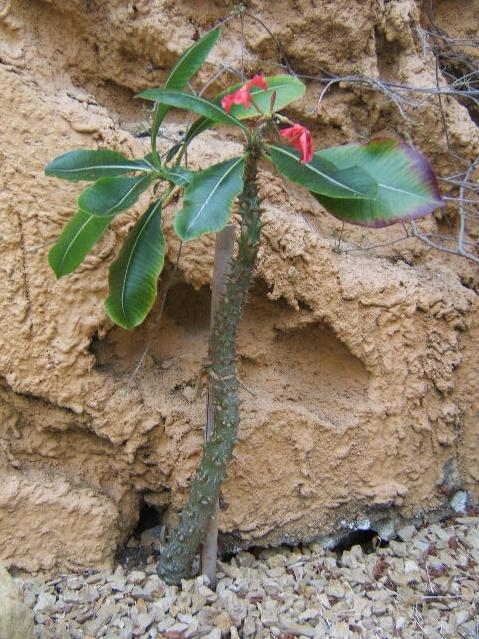
Pachypodium baronii (Bontaka)

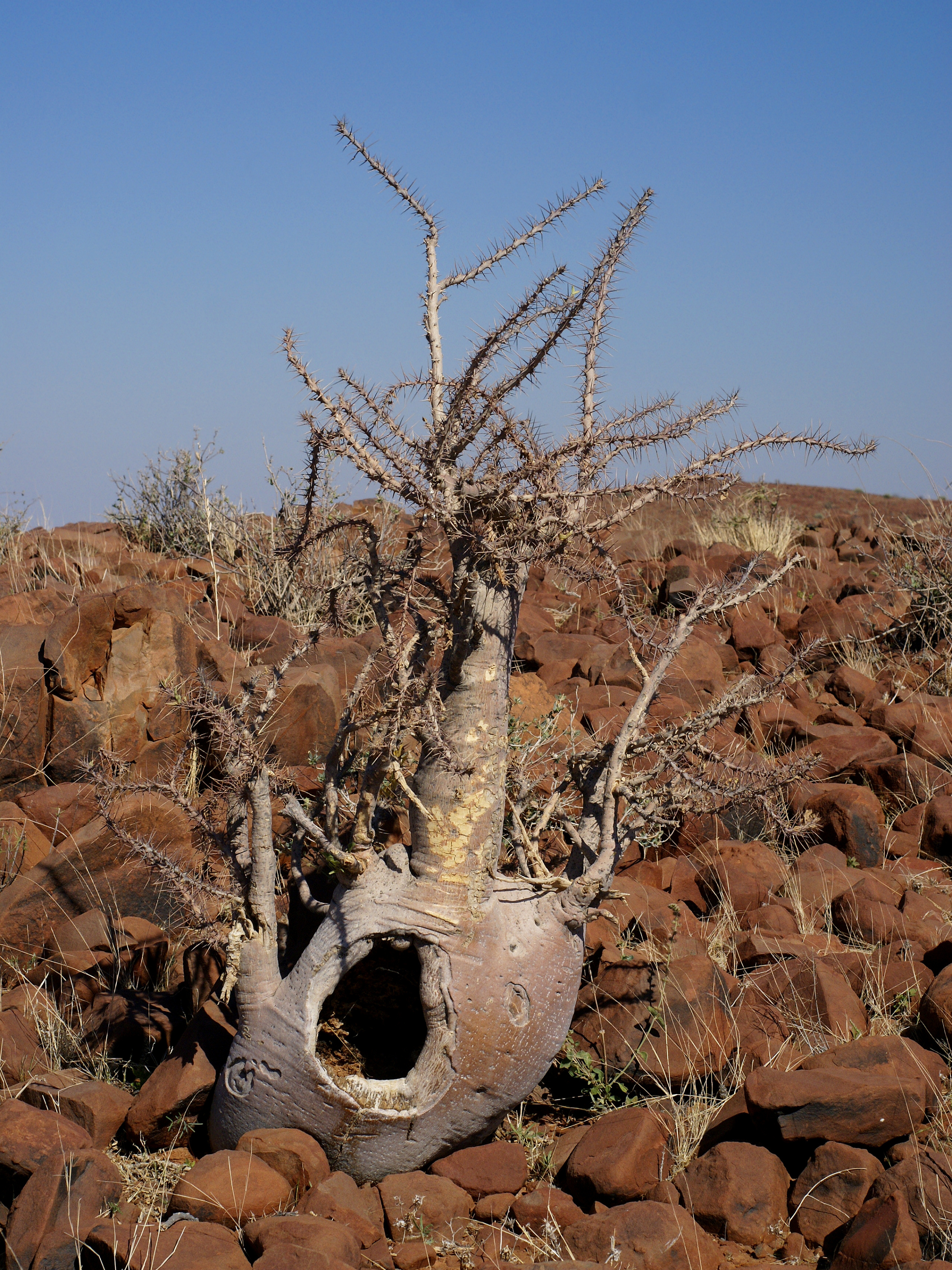
Pachypodium lealii (Bottle tree)

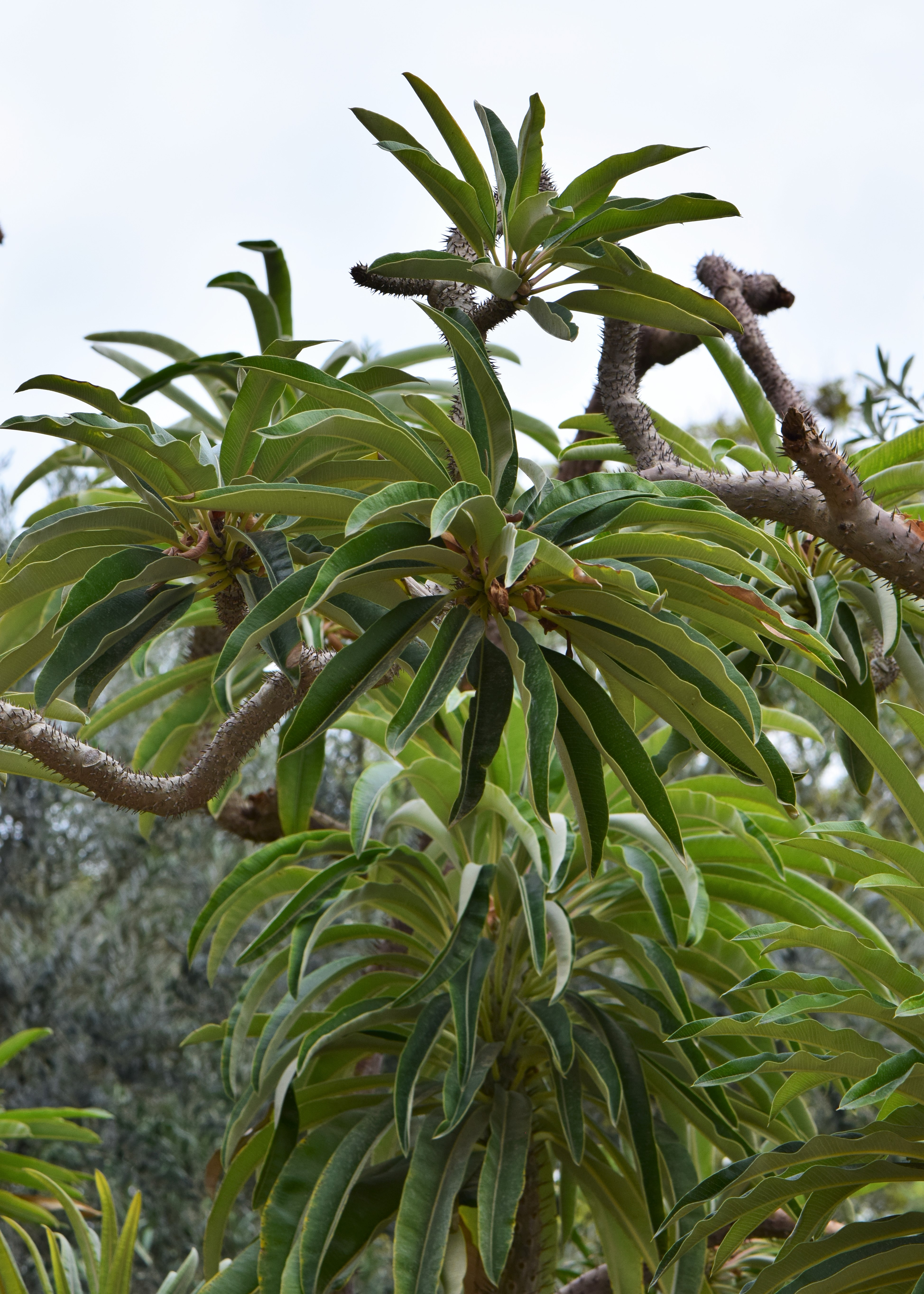
Pachypodium geayi (Geay's Pachypodium)

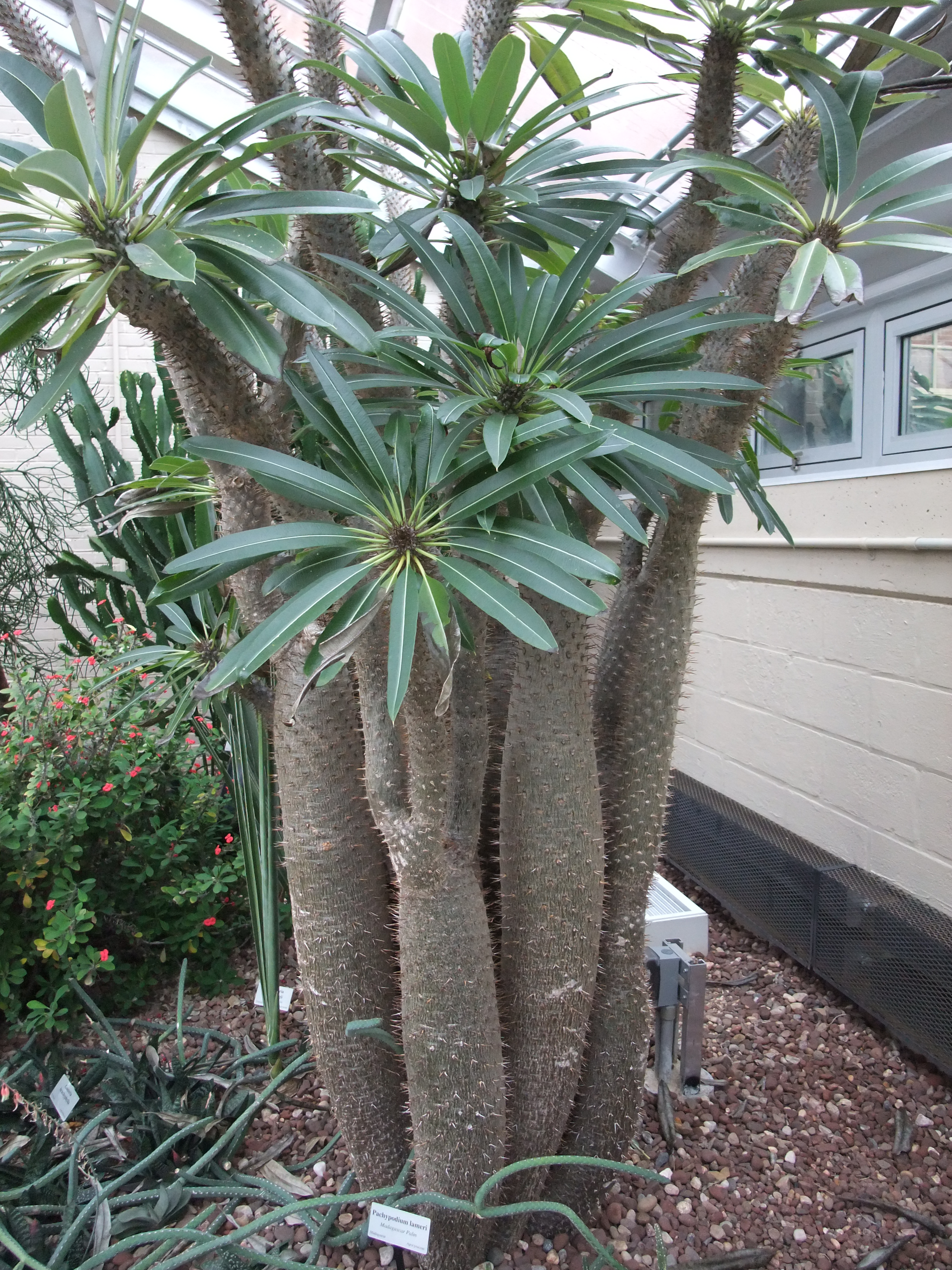
Pachypodium lamerei (Madagascar palm)

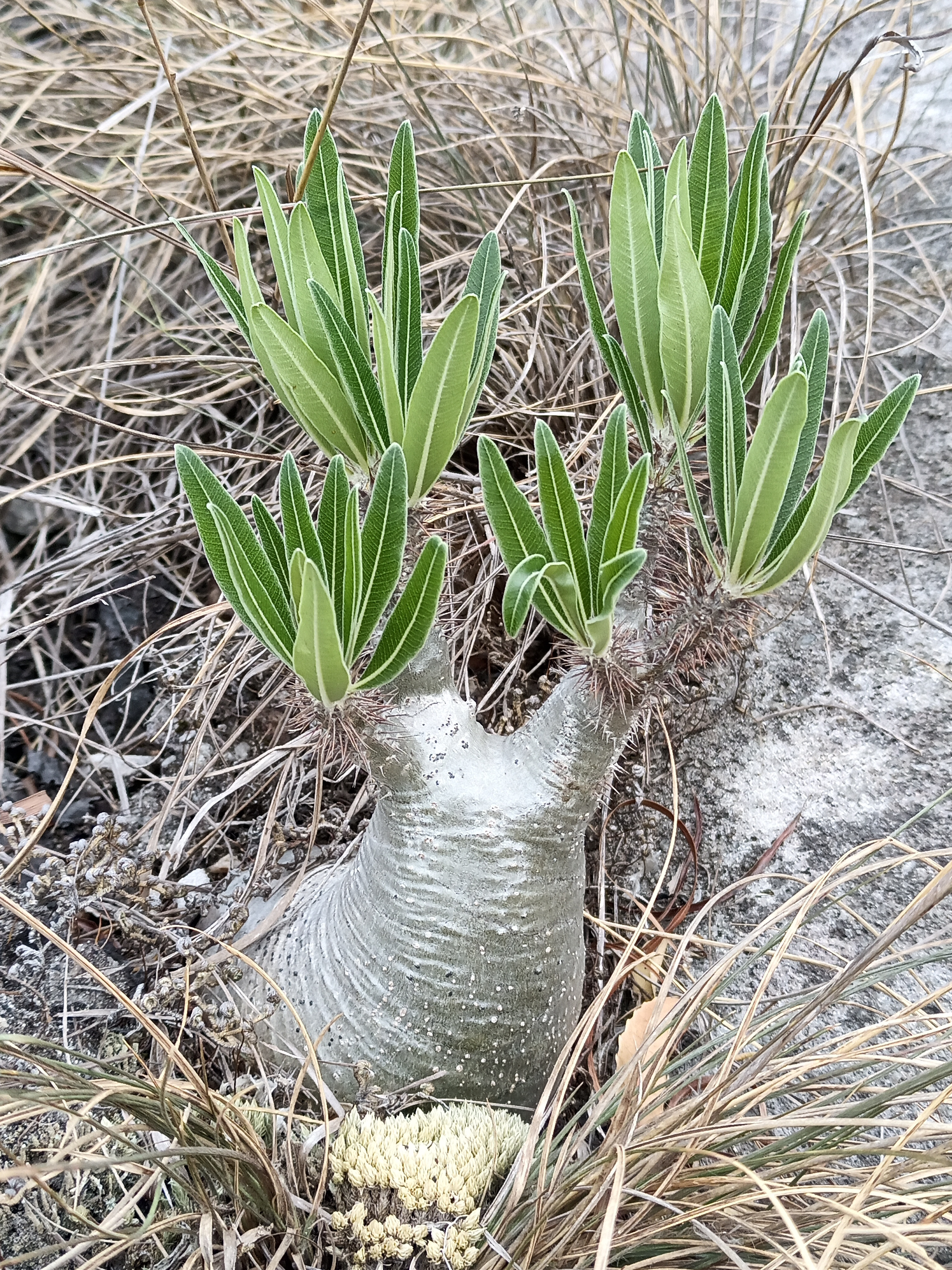
Pachypodium rosulatum (Elephant's foot plant)

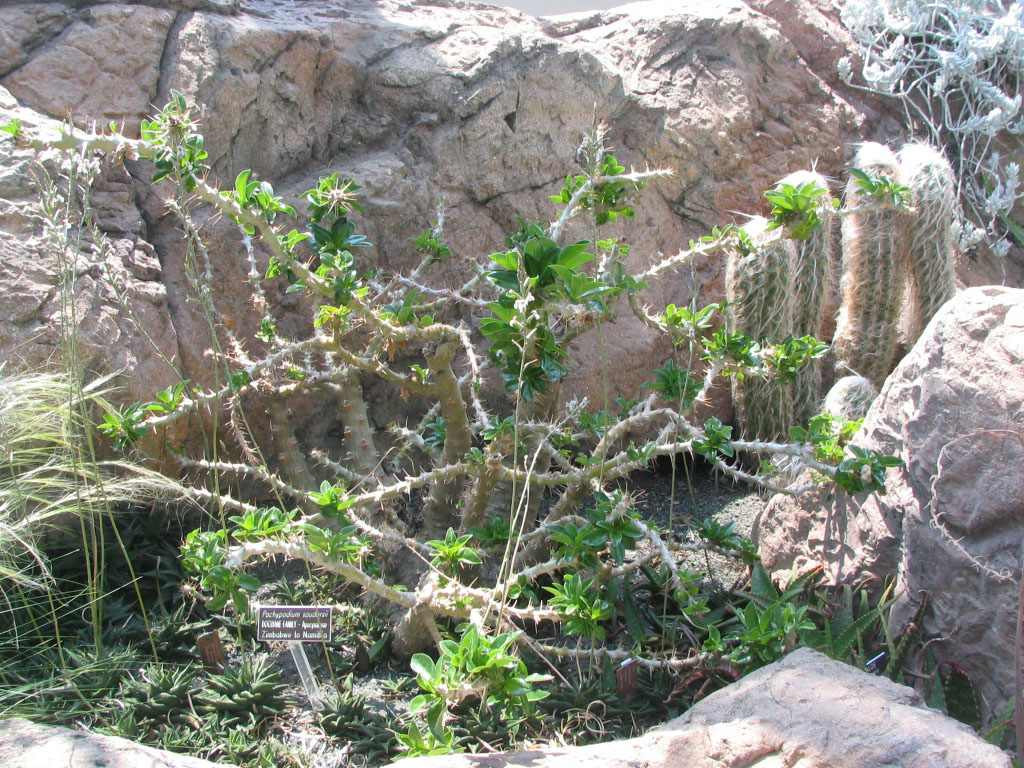
Pachypodium saundersii (Kudu lily)

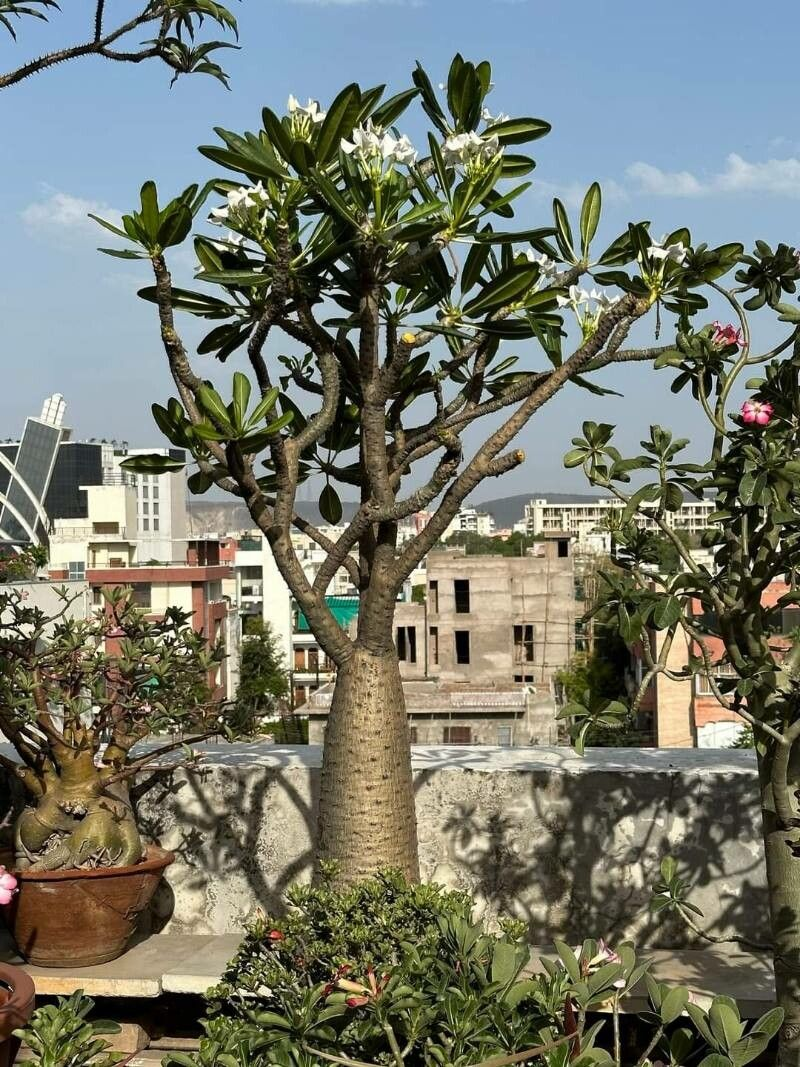
Pachypodium ambongense (Pachypodium)

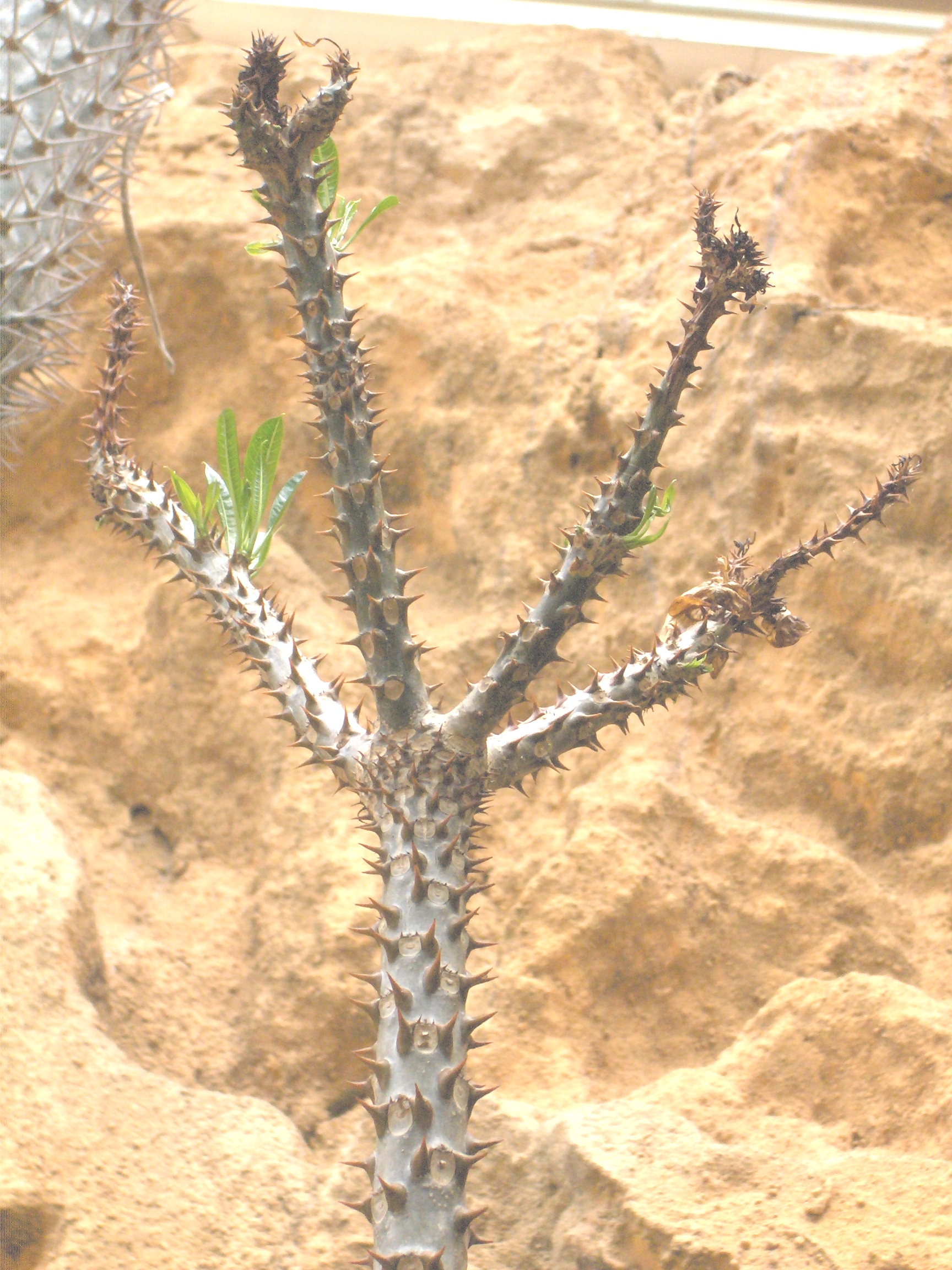
Pachypodium rutenbergianum (Rutenberg's Pachypodium)

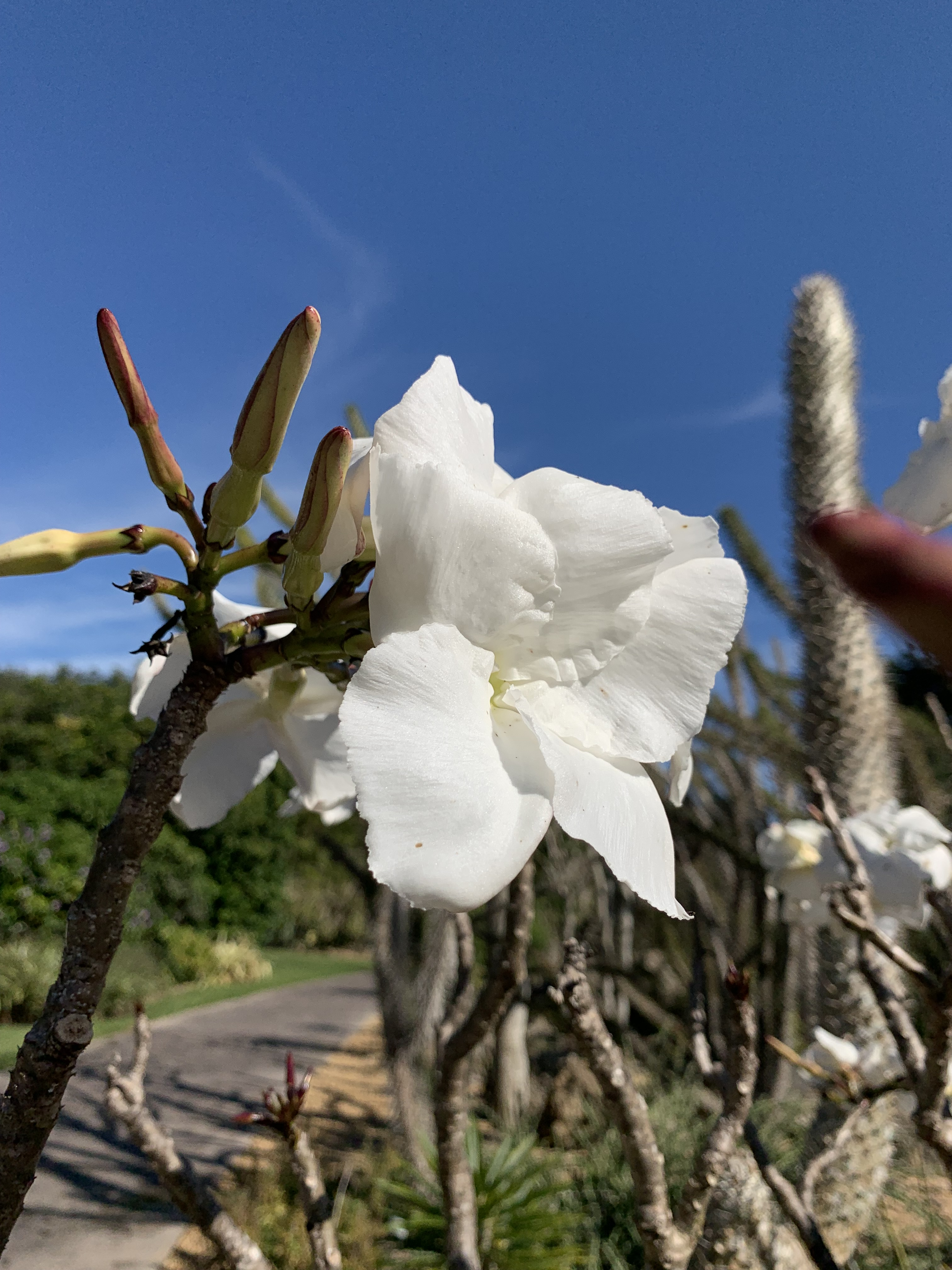
Pachypodium decaryi (Star-flower succulent)

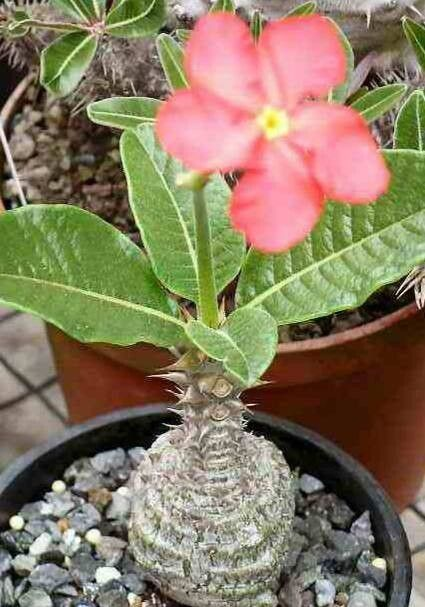
Pachypodium windsorii (Windsor's Pachypodium)

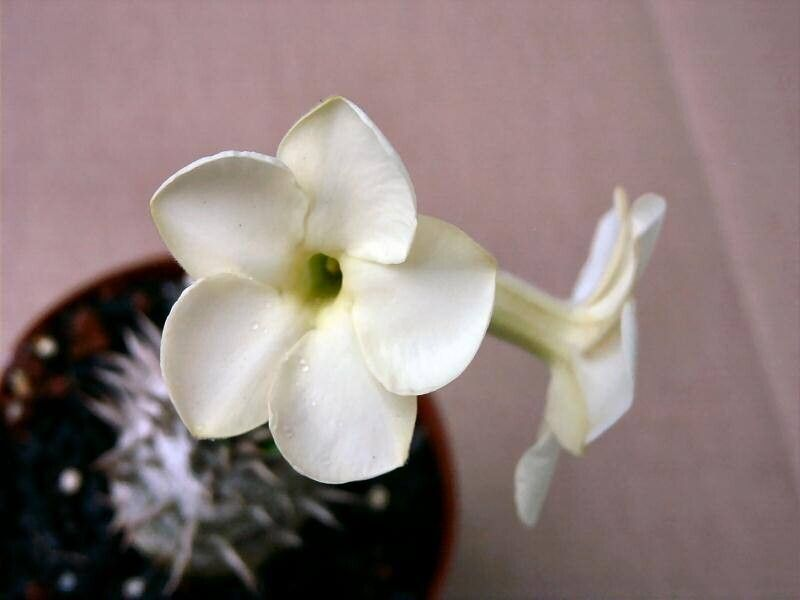
Pachypodium eburneum (Isalo palm)

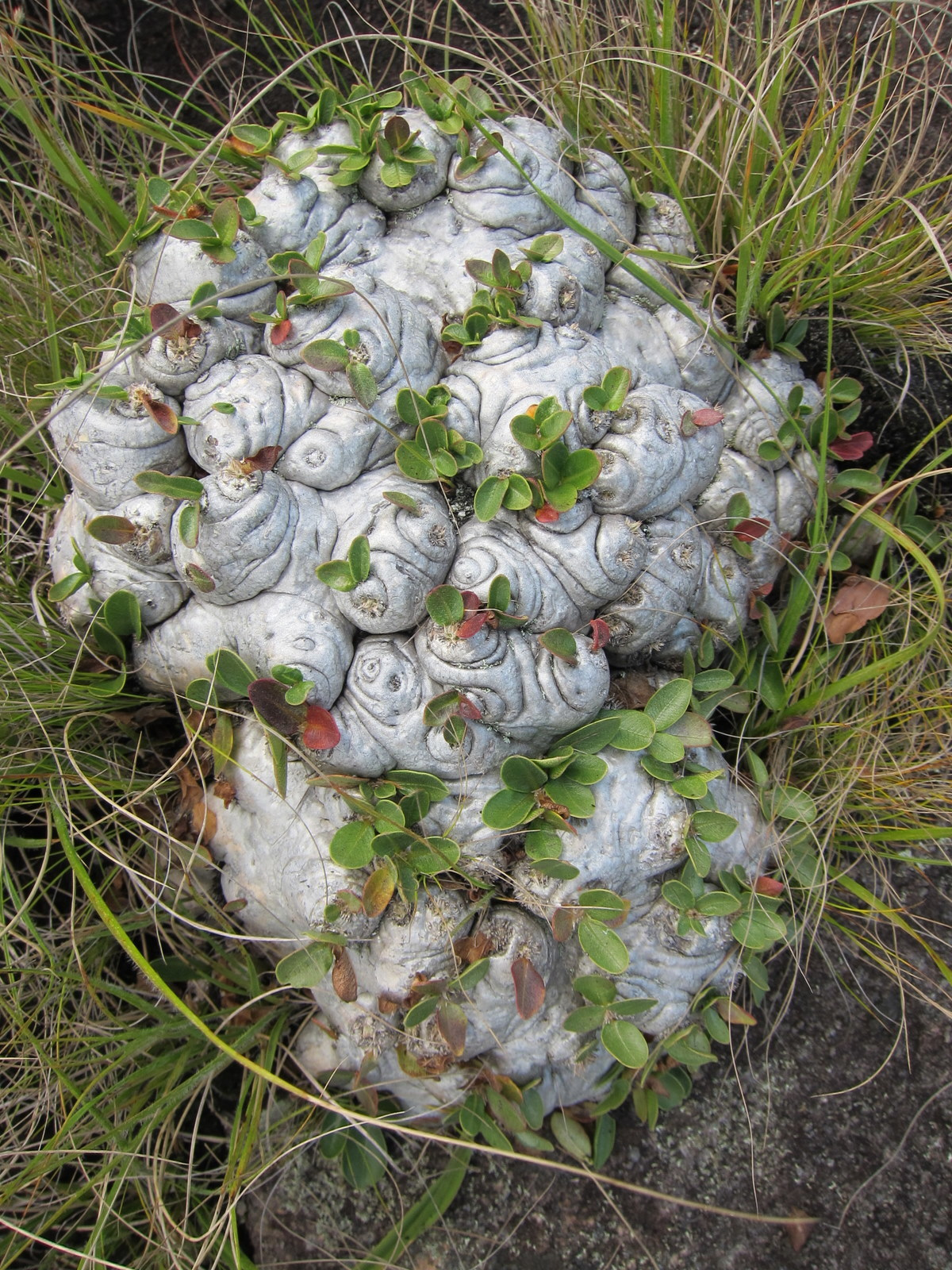
Pachypodium brevicaule (Mini Pachypodium)

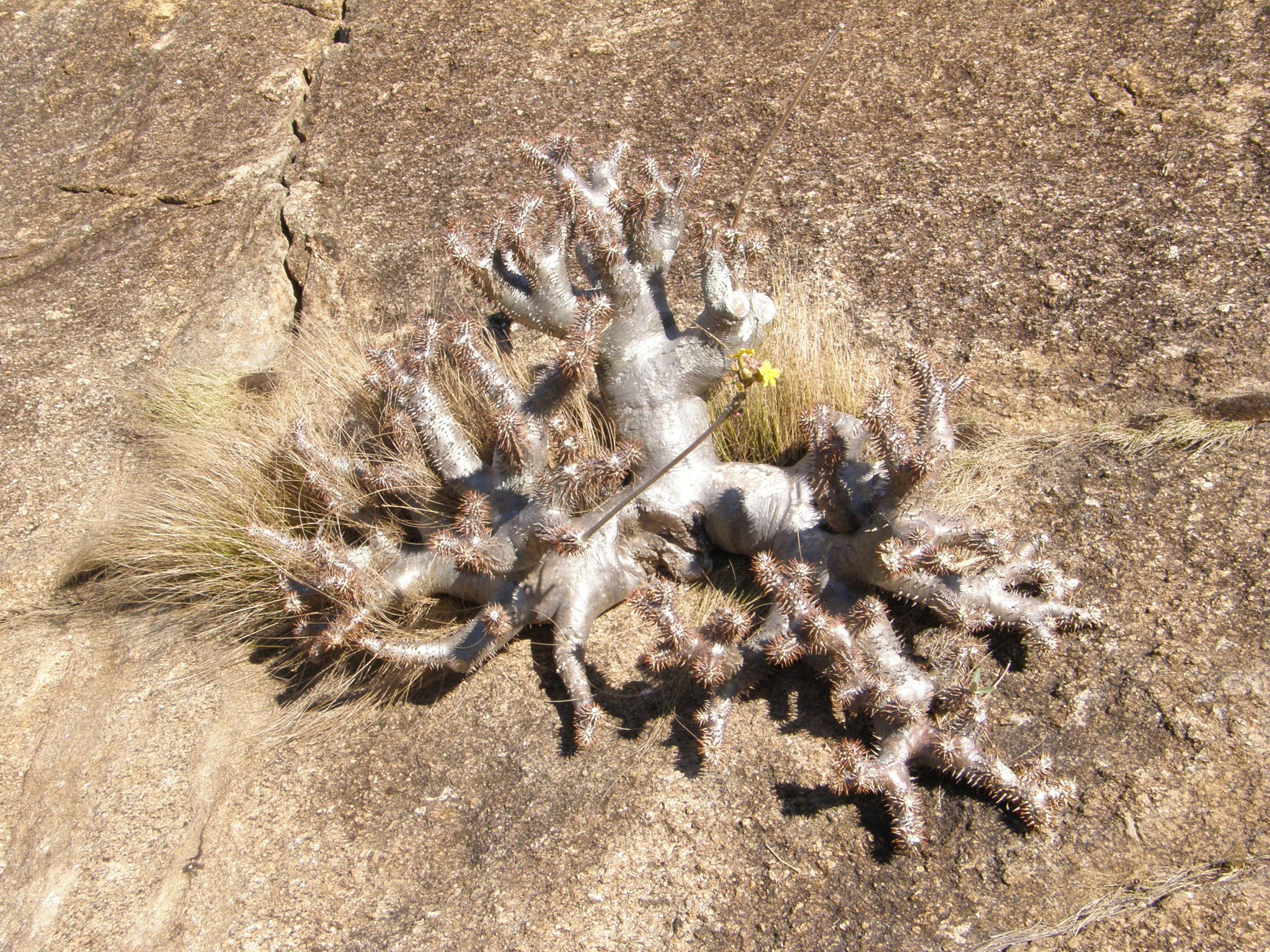
Pachypodium densiflorum (Orange Pachypodium)

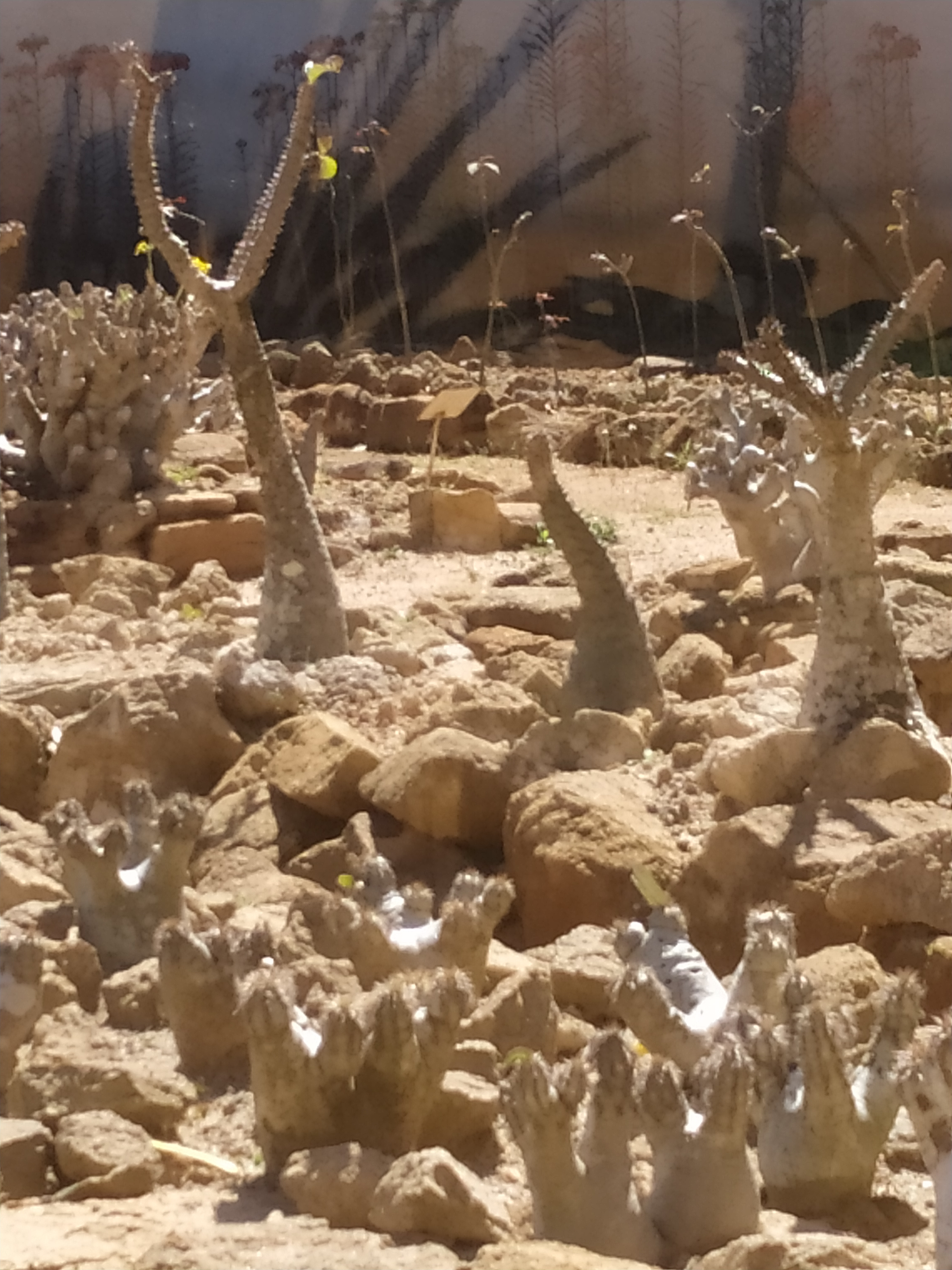
Pachypodium gracilius (Graceful Pachypodium)

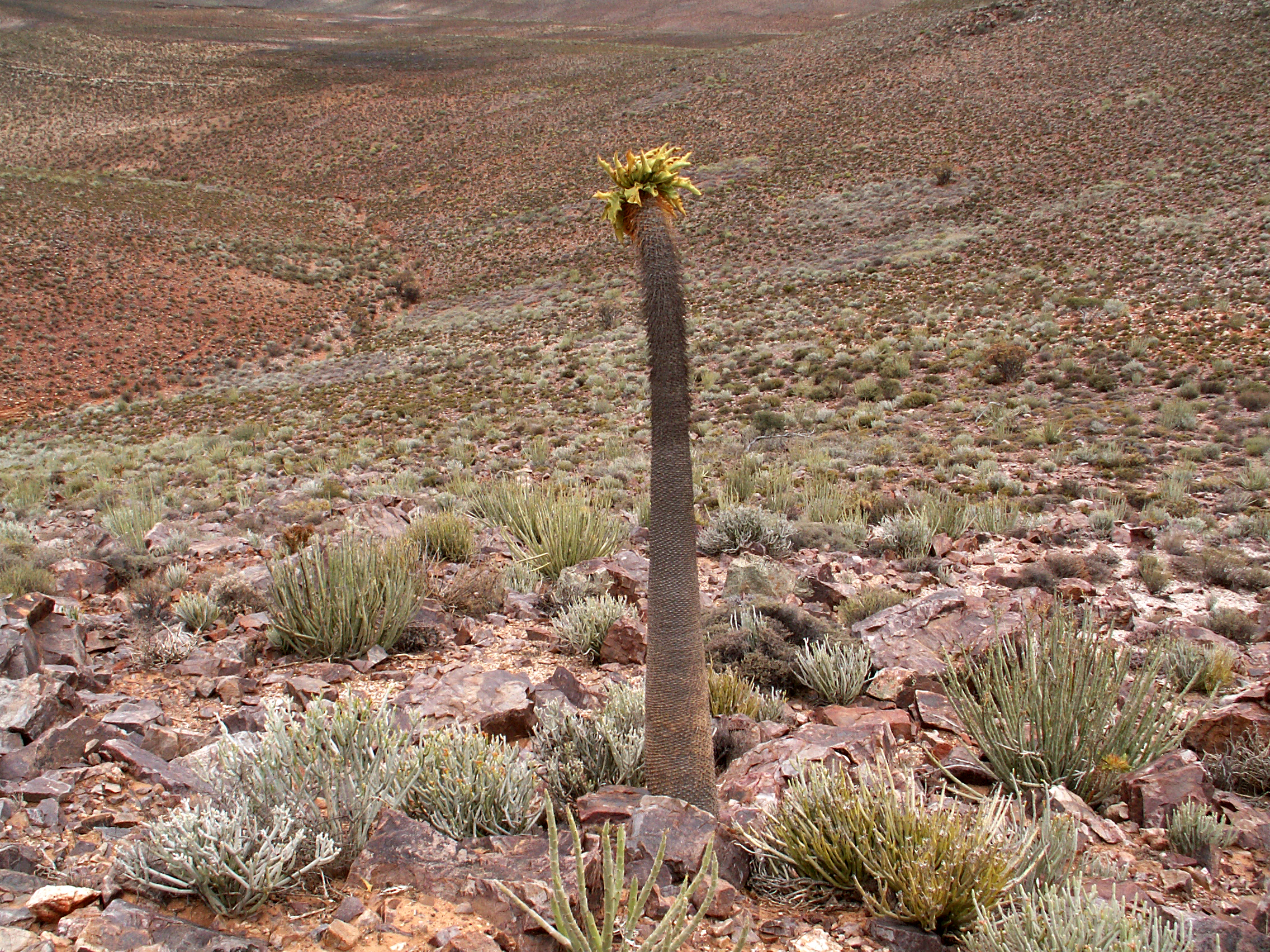
Pachypodium namaquanum (Halfmens)

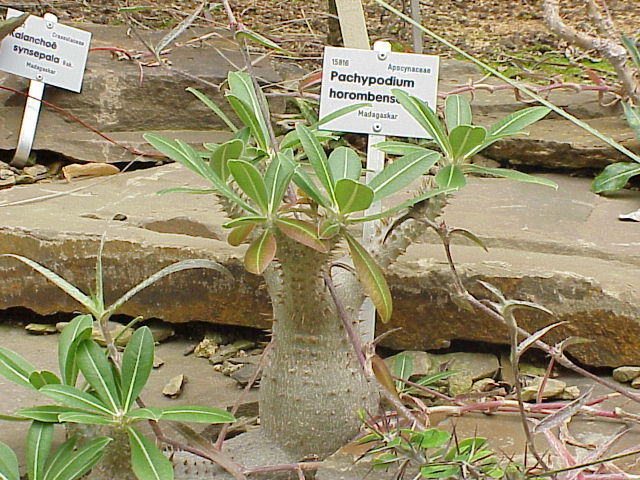
Pachypodium horombense (Horombe palm)

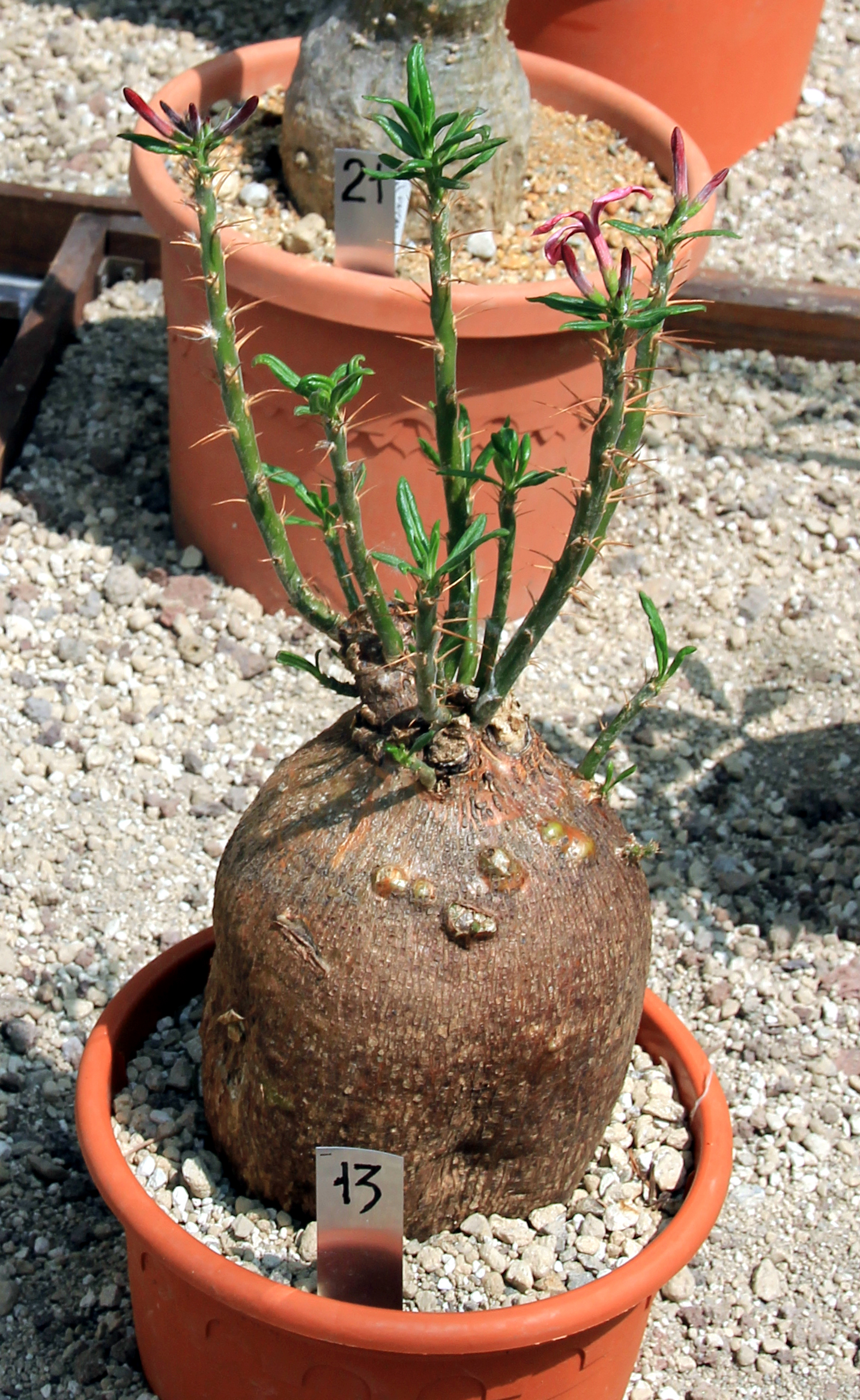
Pachypodium succulentum (Antelope-lily)

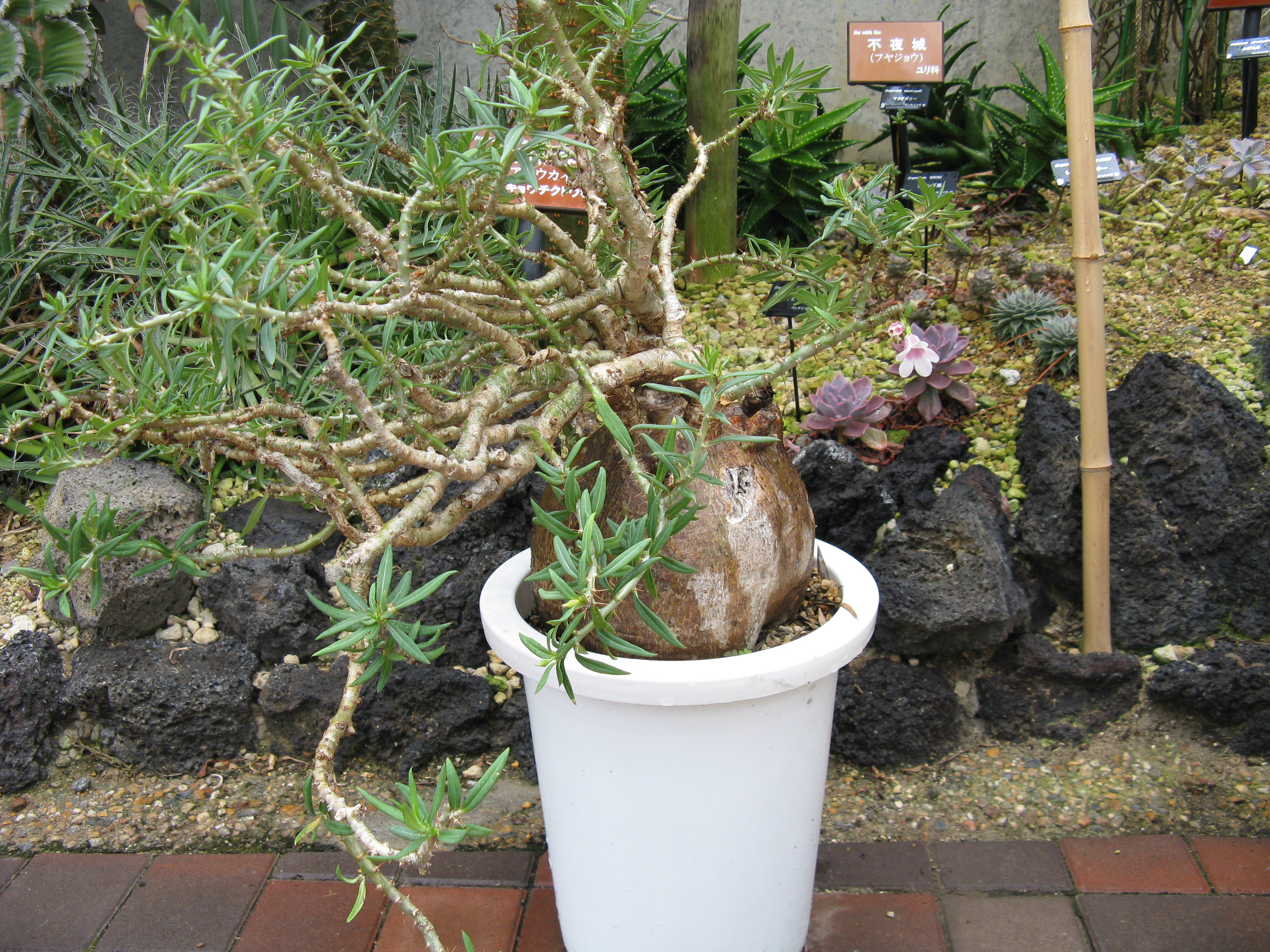
Pachypodium bispinosum (Two-spined Pachypodium)

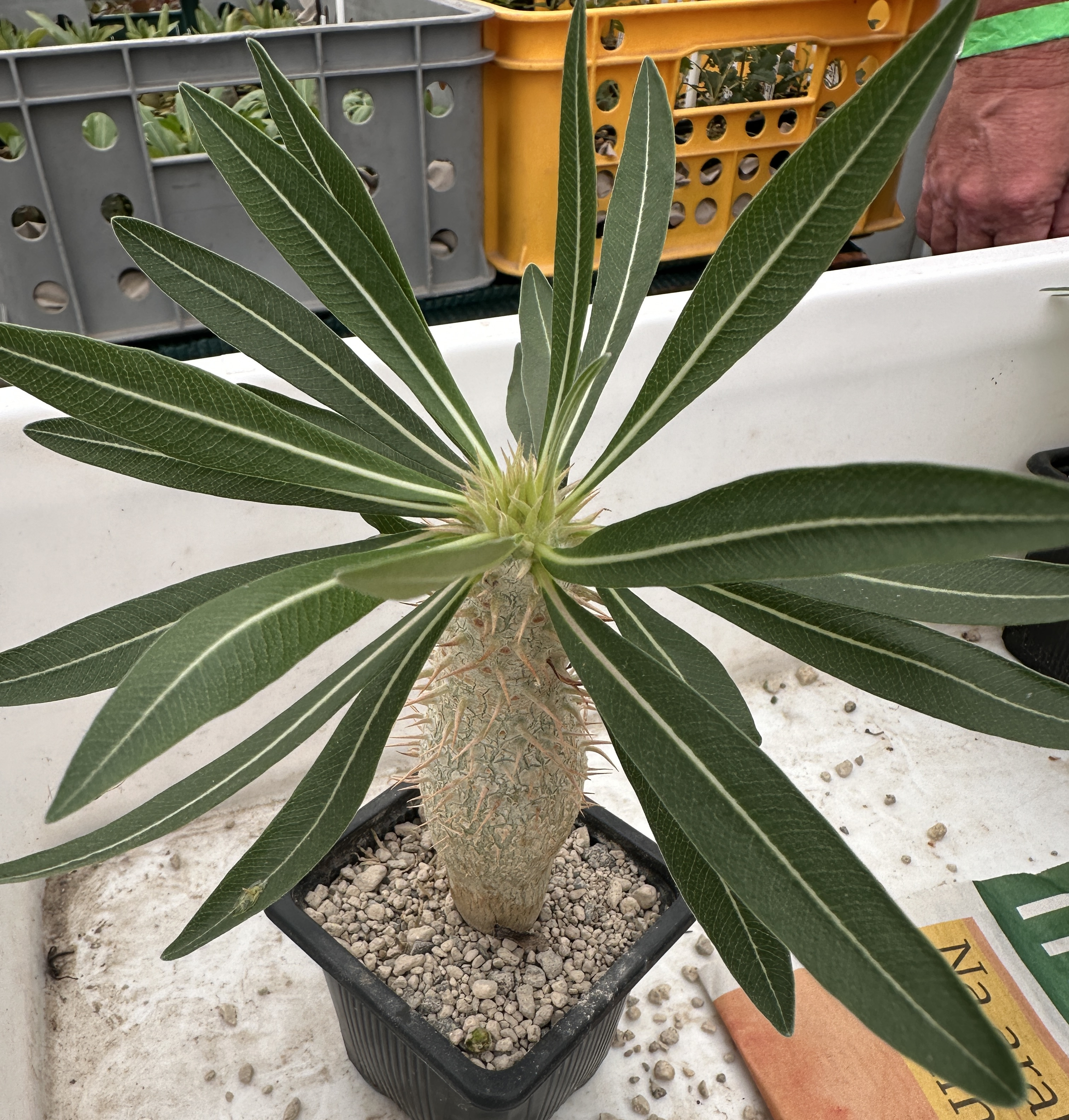
Pachypodium inopinatum (Mahajanga palm)

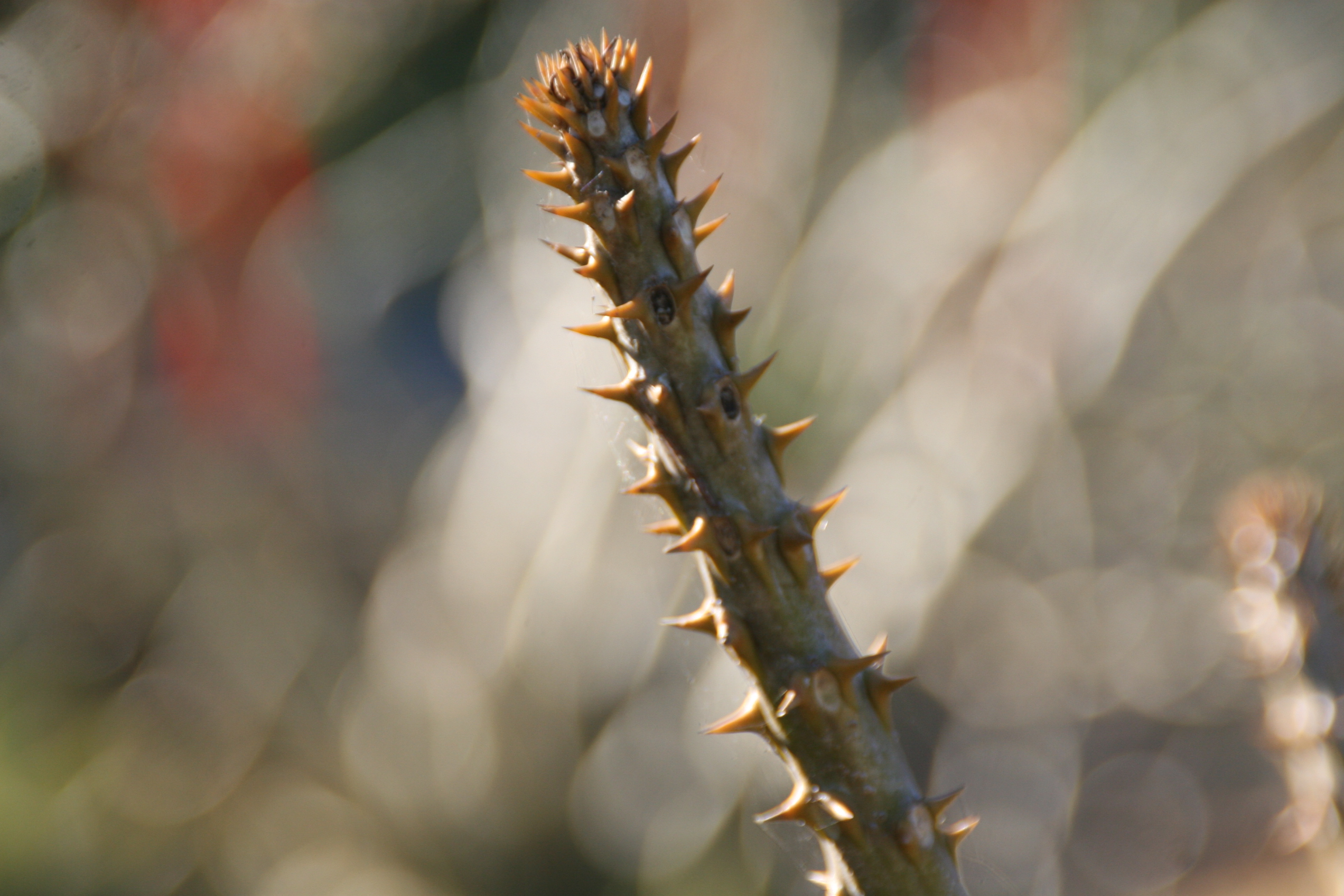
Pachypodium meridionale (Starflowering succulent)

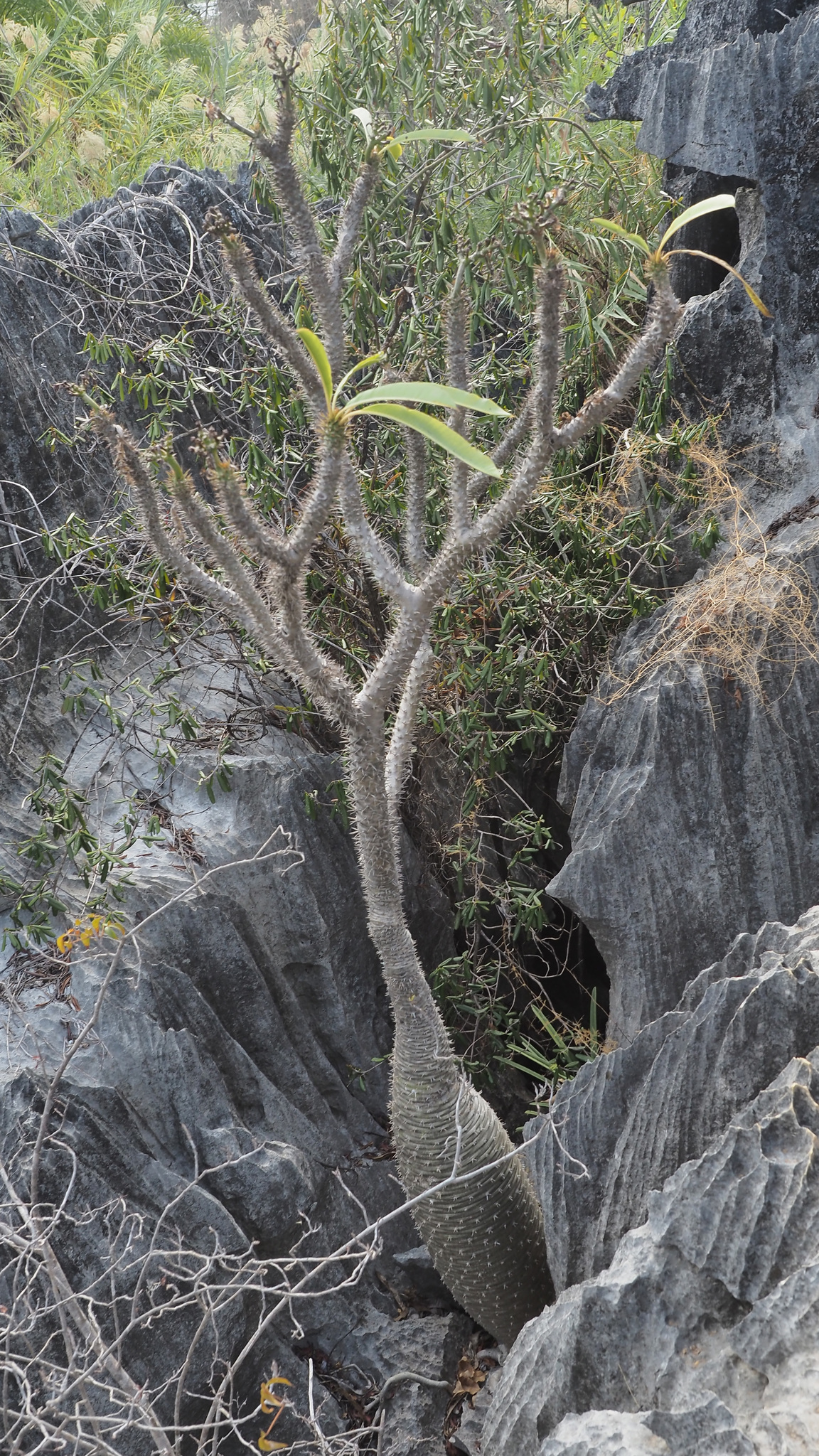
Pachypodium menabeum (Crevice Pachypodium)

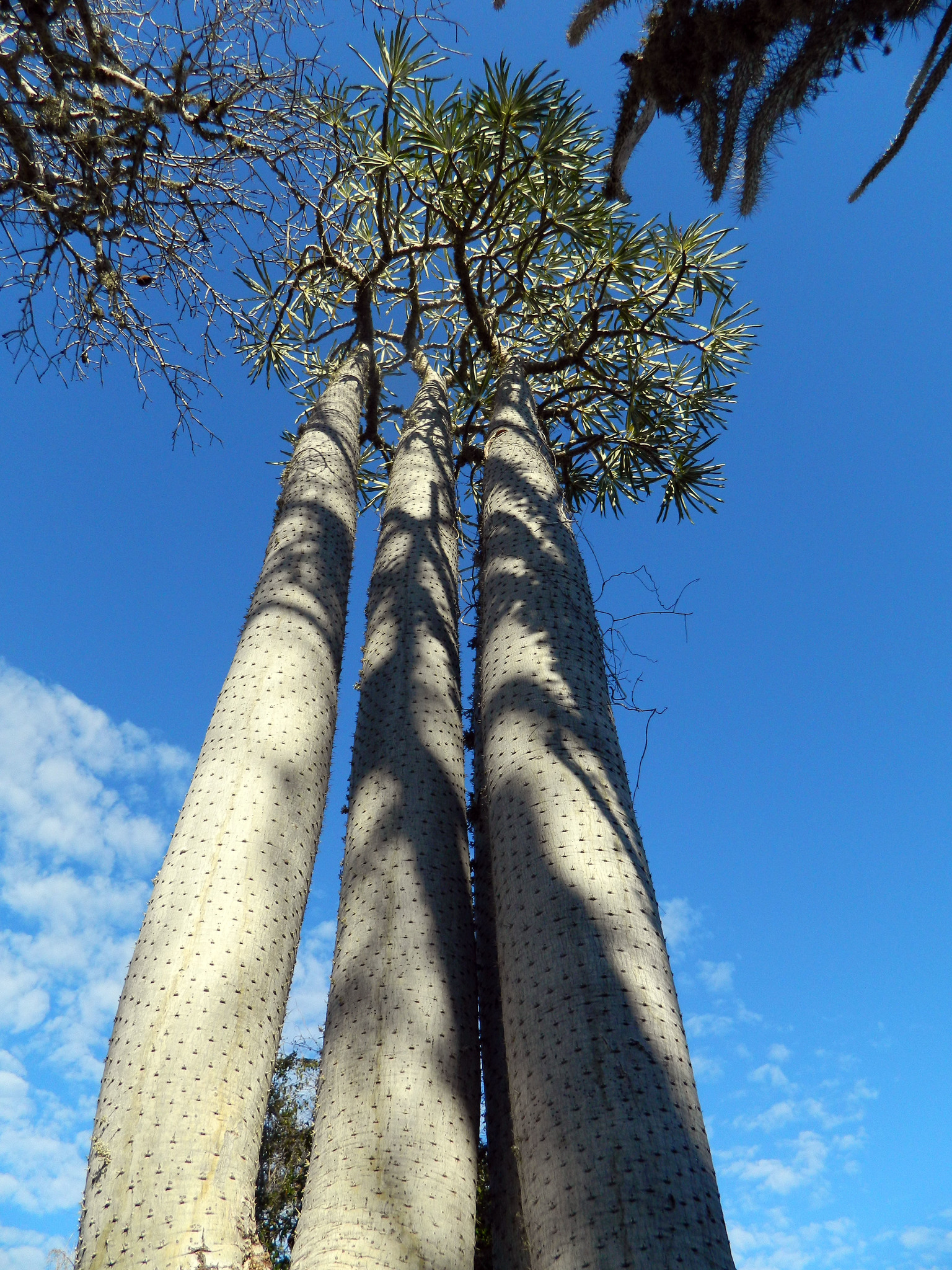
Pachypodium mikea (Bemaraha palm)

== See also ==
- Adenium - a caudiciform member of the Apocynaceae

== Bibliography ==
- Eggli, Urs. (1993) Glossary of botanical terms with special reference to Succulent Plants. with German Equivalents (British Cactus & Succulent Society: United Kingdom)
- Endress, Mary E.; Bruyns, Peter V. (2000). "A revised classification of the Apocynaceae s.l." (PDF). The Botanical Review. 66 (1): 1–56. Bibcode:2000BotRv..66....1E. doi:10.1007/BF02857781. S2CID 31739212.
- Endress, Mary: "The unification of Asclepiadaceae and Apocynaceae." Haseltonia: The Cactus and Succulent Society of America's Yearbook Vol. 8.
- Lavranos, John, J. (2004) "Pachypodium makayense: A New Species From Madagascar". Cactus and Succulent Journal: United States 76 (2) 85–88.
- Lüthy, Jonas M. "Another look at the pachypodiums of Madagascar." Bradleya: The British Cactus and Succulent Society Yearbook. (22/2004) ISBN 0-902099-74-4
- Mays, Harry. [European Union Honorary Representative] "The Huntington Botanical Gardens' 2005 offering of International Succulent Introductions for the European Union." [A Posting] (Woodsleigh, Moss Lane, St. Michaels on Wyre, Preston, PR3 0TY, UK: 2005)
- Rapanarivo, S.H.J.V., Lavranos, J.J., Leeuwenberg, A.J.M., and Röösli, W. Pachypodium (Apocynaceae): Taxonomy, habitats and cultivation "Taxonomic revision of the genus Pachypodium," S.H.J.V. Rapanarivo and J.J. Lavranos; "The habitats of Pachypodium species" S.H.J.V. Rapanarivo; "Cultivation" W. Röösli. (A.A. Balkema: Rotterdam, Brookfield, 1999) [Rapanarivo et al.]
- Rowley, Gordon, D. Cactus Handbook 5: Pachypodium and Adenium (British Cactus and Succulent Society, (1983) 1999)
- Rowley, Gordon. Didiereaceae: "Cacti of the Old World" (The British Cactus and Succulent Society [BSCS]: 1992)
- Rowley, G.D. "The Pachypodium rosulatum aggregate (Apocynaceae) - one species or several?" Bradleya: The British Cactus and Succulent Society Yearbook. (16/1998)
- Rapanarivo, S.H.J.V., Lavranos, J.J., Leeuwenberg, A.J.M., and Röösli, W. Pachypodium (Apocynaceae): Taxonomy, habitats and cultivation "Taxonomic revision of the genus Pachypodium," S.H.J.V. Rapanarivo and J.J. Lavranos; "The habitats of Pachypodium species" S.H.J.V. Rapanarivo; "Cultivation" W. Röösli. (A.A. Balkema: Rotterdam, Brookfield, 1999, p. 5) [The rest of the list is based on Rapanarivo et al.(1999)]
- Rapanarivo et al. (1999) p. 5.
