= Prisons in South Africa =

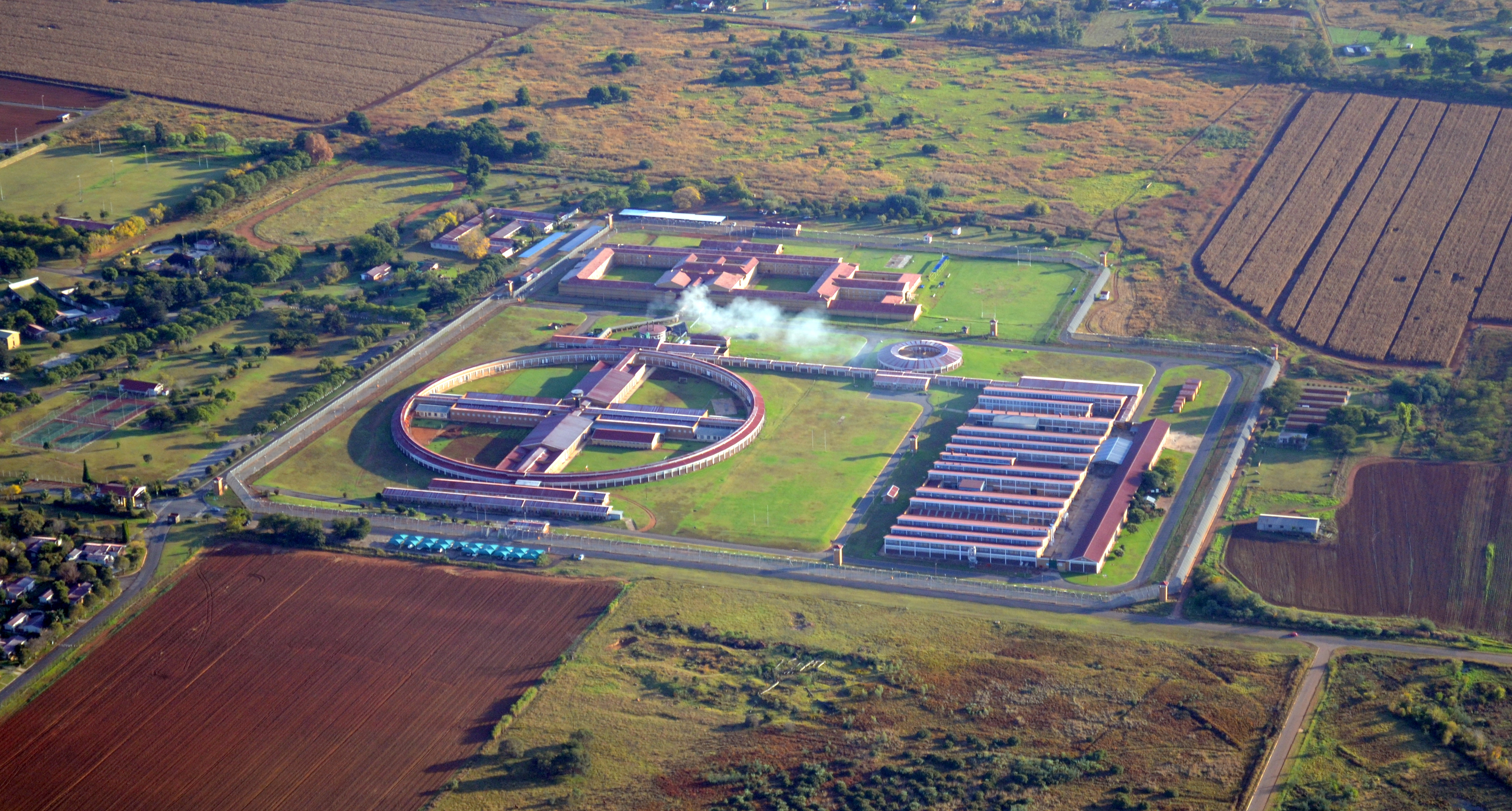
The Zonderwater Prison, Cullinan, Gauteng

Prisons in South Africa are run by the Department of Correctional Services. The department is divided into six administrative regions, each with its regional commissioner, and subdivided into multiple areas, each headed by an area commissioner.

As of March 2026, South Africa has a total of 443 correctional facilities, housing an inmate population of over 168,000. This constitutes around 0.26% of the country's population.

South Africa's prisons include minimum, medium, maximum and super-maximum security facilities. They may be entirely dedicated to a specific group of prisoners, such as women or children, or be divided into separate sections for each group. Since 2024, the Minister of Correctional Services has been Pieter Groenewald.

== Prison reform ==
The prison system in South Africa was first introduced by the European settlers. Even in the pre-apartheid era, racial factors played a major role, with white prisoners living in better conditions and receiving better treatment than their black counterparts. During the apartheid era, cultural norms afforded the subjectivity of guilt to the assessment of the whites, which led to Black South Africans being adversely affected. Prisons were segregated on the basis of race during this period. In the post-apartheid era, a number of reforms were initiated, and the irrelevant role that race had played until then was removed.

== Notable former prisoners ==
During the Apartheid era, many political activists were imprisoned for campaigning against the government. These include: ANC and PAC freedom fighters such as Robert Sobukwe (1960–1978), Jafta Masemola (1962–1989), Nelson Mandela (1962–1990), Raymond Mhlaba (1963–1989), Walter Sisulu (1963–1989), Govan Mbeki (1963–1987), Denis Goldberg (1963–1985), Tokyo Sexwale (1977–1990), and many others. A notable recent inmate was Annanias Mathe, a serial killer, the only person to escape from the maximum security prison C Max in Pretoria.

== Notable current and former prisons ==
Notable prisons include:

- Boksburg Prison in Boksburg, South Africa
- Brandvlei Correctional Centre in Worcester, Western Cape
- Drakenstein Correctional Centre, formerly Victor Verster Prison, near Paarl, Western Cape
- Grootvlei Prison near Bloemfontein, Free State
- Johannesburg Prison, also known as Sun City Jail, in Sun City, Johannesburg, Gauteng
- Kgosi Mampuru II Management Area, formerly Pretoria Central Prison, in Pretoria, Gauteng. C Max is its maximum security section.
- Kokstad Prison at Kokstad, KwaZulu-Natal
- Leeuwkop Maximum Correctional Centre in Bryanston, Gauteng
- Mangaung Prison in Bloemfontein, Free State
- Matatshe Prison at Thohoyandou, Limpopo
- Modderbee Prison in Benoni, Gauteng
- Old Gaol Building in Ingwavuma, KwaZulu-Natal
- Pollsmoor Prison in Tokai, Cape Town, Western Cape
- Robben Island off the coast of Cape Town, Western Cape
- Westville Prison at Westville, KwaZulu-Natal
- Zonderwater Prison near Cullinan, Gauteng
