= Ingwavuma =

Town in South Africa

- Location within KwaZulu-Natal Location within South Africa
- Coordinates: 27°8′S 32°0′E
- Country: South Africa
- Province: KwaZulu-Natal
- District: Umkhanyakude
- Municipality: Jozini

Area
  - Total: 1.74 km^{2} (0.67 sq mi)

Population (2011)
  - Total: 1,303
  - Density: 749/km^{2} (1,940/sq mi)

Racial makeup (2011)
  - Black African: 97.2%
  - Coloured: 0.2%
  - Indian/Asian: 1.6%
  - White: 1.0%

First languages (2011)
  - Zulu: 87.2%
  - English: 2.9%
  - S. Ndebele: 1.8%
  - Sign language: 1.6%
  - Other: 6.6%
- Time zone: UTC+2 (SAST)
- PO box: 3968
- Area code: 035

Ingwavuma is a town in the Umkhanyakude District Municipality of KwaZulu-Natal Province, South Africa. It is unclear where the name of the town came from; one theory is that it was named after the Ngwavuma River while another is that there was a leader called Vuma, the name then meaning "Vuma's place" in Zulu. Trees found on the river bank are also named Ngwavuma (Elaeodendron transvaalense or bushveld saffron) but it is unclear which entity was named after which (person, river, town or trees). It is over 700 metres (2,297 feet) above sea level in the Lebombo Mountains and boasts several highly scenic spots. The town is three kilometres (2 miles) from the country's border with Eswatini and overlooks the plains of Maputaland to the East.

== History ==
Zulu king Dingane was assassinated and buried in the nearby Hlatikhulu Forest in 1840. Ingwavuma was founded by Sir Charles Saunders of Eshowe in 1895 as a magistracy for the Ngwavuma region. During the Second Boer War in 1899 the settlement was razed to the ground by a Boer commando under the command of Joachim Ferreira. The serving magistrate, B. Colenbrander, escaped with his staff to the flats below and eventually found his way to Ubombo. Ingwavuma remained desolate until 1900 when it was re-established and the magistrate returned.

In the 1980s the Apartheid government planned to transfer the town and surrounding magisterial district to Swaziland as part of a land deal to give Eswatini access to the sea. This move was opposed by the then KwaZulu government and the Zulu King Goodwill Zwelethini established a residence near the town. The transfer was never executed. The surviving historic buildings of the town include the residency (now the municipal buildings), the police station and the Old Gaol Building.

== Services and facilities ==
- Mosvold Hospital is located within the centre of the town. The hospital was initially established by The Evangelical Alliance Mission as a mission hospital but has subsequently been taken over by the KwaZulu-Natal Department of Health.
- There are a number of schools in and around the town including Ingwavuma High School, Nansindlela School, Isicelosethu High School, Magugu Primary, Our Lady Primary, Lundini Primary, Mbalekelwa primary and Khethani Christian School.
- Local offices of the government departments of Social Development, Agriculture, Education and Home Affairs. There is also a police station, magistrate's court and prison.
- Several NGOs provide essential services in the area, including the Zisize (Ingwavuma) Educational Trust, which oversees the Ekukhanyeni Cluster Foster Care Scheme; the Ingwavuma Women's Centre and Embathisa, both of which offer income-generating activities for local women; Ingwavuma Orphan Care, which provides community hospice and orphan care; and Butterfly Palliative Home, a non-profit children's hospice caring for orphaned and abandoned children with life-limiting conditions.
- There is a small shopping centre consisting of a Spar, PEP, Ellerines, Ithala Bank and a petrol garage along with some Chinese-owned shops.
- In 1962, the town was made the seat of the Apostolic Prefecture of Ingwavuma.
- Ingwavuma has an access road to the border with Swaziland, known as Cecil max pas border post which was closed due to stolen vehicles being smuggled through there. Later it was renamed to Freedom dots border post. The road to this border post to Swaziland lies between a Lebombo mountain hillside and the Ngwavuma river.

== Geography ==
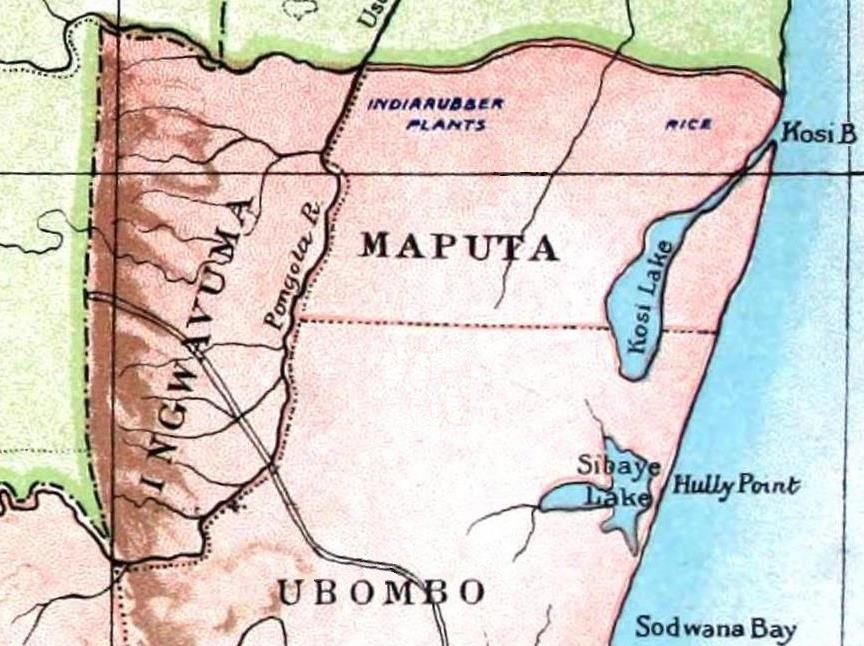
The former Ingwavuma county of Natal on a map of 1911

Ingwavuma is located on top of a mountain in the Lebombo mountain range with several caves in its vicinity. To the west it overlooks the plains of Eswatini. East the hills drop towards the Maputaland while the Lebombo mountain range continues north towards Mozambique and south towards Jozini.

The Ngwavuma River, one of five major rivers in Eswatini originates in this area.

== HIV/AIDS ==
The Ingwavuma Area has been decimated by HIV/AIDS since the 1990s. In 2002, in Jozini municipality, 57% of people were less than 19 years of age, one third of adults were thought to be HIV positive with uninfected adults having a 3% chance of contracting HIV in any particular year. Several Non-Governmental Organisations are addressing the problems caused by HIV/AIDS, led by Ingwavuma Orphan Care. A mobile voluntary counseling and testing unit (VCT) was started in 2008 by Ingwavuma Orphan Care. It tests around 5000 people a year, with its focus on youth. It found a prevalence rate of 8% among males and 18% among females. While antiretroviral treatment is now available through the government, there are already thousands of orphans who require support. The majority of these are cared for by their extended family with support from churches, NGOs and the government.

== See also ==
- Border Cave, archaeological site
- Cecil Macks Pass, a nearby mountain pass
