= Marshal Clarke =

British colonial administrator

Lieutenant-Colonel Sir Marshal James Clarke KCMG

1st Resident Commissioner in Southern Rhodesia
- In office 5 December 1898 – 1 April 1905
- Succeeded by: Richard Chester-Master

2nd Resident Commissioner in Zululand
- In office 1893–1898
- Governor: Sir Walter Hely-Hutchinson
- Preceded by: Sir Melmoth Osborn
- Succeeded by: Charles Saunders

1st Resident Commissioner in Basutoland
- In office 18 March 1884 – 18 September 1893
- Monarch: Victoria
- Succeeded by: Godfrey Yeatman Lagden

Personal details
- Born: 24 October 1841 Tipperary, Ireland
- Died: 1 April 1909 (aged 67) Enniskerry, Ireland
- Spouse: Annie Stacy Lloyd (m. 1880)
- Children: 3
- Education: Trinity College, Dublin; Royal Military Academy, Woolwich
- Awards: Twice mentioned in despatches; Order of the Medjidie

Military service
- Allegiance: British Empire
- Years of service: 1863–1883
- Rank: Lieutenant-Colonel
- Unit: Royal Artillery
- Battles/wars: First Boer War

Lieutenant-Colonel Sir Marshal James Clarke KCMG (24 October 1841 – 1 April 1909) was a British colonial administrator and an officer of the Royal Artillery. He was the first Resident Commissioner in Basutoland from 1884 to 1893; Resident Commissioner in Zululand from 1893 to 1898; and, following the botched Jameson Raid, the first Resident Commissioner in Southern Rhodesia from 1898 to 1905.

For his work in Basutoland, Clarke drew praise from the economist John A. Hobson in his treatise Imperialism for his devotion to the education and development of the native people, while Viscount Bryce noted that his approach fostered goodwill amongst native people towards Britain. In Zululand, Clarke granted considerable authority and special judicial functions to the hereditary chiefs; and was commended by Sir Walter Hely-Hutchinson, Governor of Natal, for his action in the face of potential famine. He recommended to the Imperial Government the return from exile of Dinuzulu, the paramount chief. While in Southern Rhodesia, he was appointed to protect the interests of native people against the overarching ambitions of the British South Africa Company.

He married Annie Stacy Lloyd, daughter of Major General Banastyre Pryce Lloyd in 1880 and had three children. He died suddenly of pneumonia in his home country of Ireland.

== Early life ==
Reverend Mark Clarke, the Rector and Vicar of Shronell, County Tipperary, married Maria Hill on 6 April 1837. Marshal James Clarke was their eldest son, born on 24 October 1841. He was born in Tipperary, educated at a private school in Dublin and studied at Trinity College, Dublin. He went on to study at the Royal Military Academy, Woolwich and was commissioned a Lieutenant in the Royal Artillery in February 1863.

He served in India, where he lost an arm to a tiger. Moving to Africa, he was Resident Magistrate of Pietermaritzburg in 1874. He was promoted to captain in December 1875. He was Aide-de-Camp to Sir Theophilus Shepstone, the Special Commissioner of South Africa in 1876 on his mission to the Transvaal. He was appointed Special Commissioner to South Africa in 1876. He was Political Officer and Special Commissioner of Lydenburg in 1877. During the First Boer War, Clarke was twice mentioned in despatches. He was brevetted Major in April 1880 in recognition of his services during operations in South Africa. He was Resident Magistrate of Basutoland in 1881. He was promoted to Major in November 1882. He was Commissioner of Cape Police in 1882. He was seconded to the Sultan of Turkey's army in command of a regiment of the Egyptian Gendarmerie in 1882.

He retired from the military in March 1883 with the honorary rank of Lieutenant-Colonel.

== Basutoland (1884–1893) ==
Clarke was appointed the first Resident Commissioner in Basutoland (today Lesotho) and took office on 16 March 1884. In the preceding years, Basutoland had become unruly. In 1879, an uprising by Chief Morosi was quelled but led to intertribal strife over the partition of his land. The Cape government sought to regain control in 1880 by extending the Cape Peace Preservation Act of 1878 to Basutoland, which provided for the disarmament of natives. Attempts to enforce the law resulted in the Basuto Gun War of 1880 to 1881. Unrest continued until it was agreed in 1884 to place the territory under direct British control.

Under Imperial Administration through Clarke, Basutoland once again demonstrated the loyalty seen under previous Imperial rule and returned to prosperity, supplying neighbouring territories with grain and livestock, as well as labour for the Kimberley Diamond Fields. James Bryce (later Viscount Bryce) noted in his Impressions, after his tour of Southern Africa in 1897, that Clarke combined tactfulness with firmness in order to inspire goodwill towards the British government. While he suppressed the more "noxious" customs of the native people, he did not allow Europeans to own land and mineral prospectors were forbidden: the only whites permitted to reside were officials, missionaries and certain traders. Clarke's policy was to reinstate the tribal institutions and to govern through the recognised chiefs, amongst whom Letsie, son of Moshesh, was paramount. An annual pitso (national assembly) was held to debate questions of welfare. The white authorities only intervened when disturbances occurred between natives.

Clarke served until 1893. John A. Hobson, in Imperialism, A Study (1902), summed up Clarke's work in Basutoland saying that, along with other administrators like Sir George Grey and Lord Ripon, he "...brought sympathy and knowledge to the establishment of careful experiments in self-government." Hobson compares the approach to imperialism in Basutoland with that in Rhodesia and the Cape Colony, noting that "in the former it is devoted to protecting and aiding the education and development of the native people, while in the latter two, the policy allows for the exploitation of the people and lands by white colonists." The Paris Evangelical Missionary Society honoured him in appreciation for his work to bring about peace and good governance.

== Zululand (1893–1898) ==
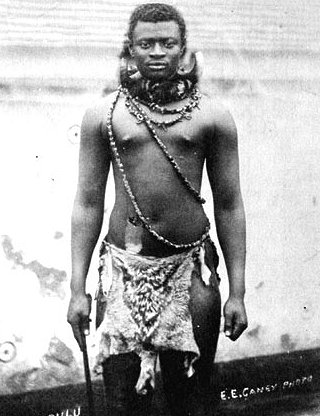
Dinuzulu c. 1883

Sir Marshal Clarke succeeded Sir Melmoth Osborn as Resident Commissioner and Chief Magistrate in Zululand in June 1893. Sir Walter Hely-Hutchinson was appointed successor to Sir Charles Mitchell as Governor of the colony in August 1893, as well as Governor of Natal, which was to gain responsible government two months later.

The conclusion of the Anglo-Zulu War in 1879 had resulted in the imprisonment of the Zulu king Cetshwayo on Robben Island and the division of the Zulu Kingdom into 13 chiefdoms. In 1883, after John Colenso, Bishop of Natal, appealed on his behalf, Cetshwayo was released and restored to power. Zibhebhu kaMaphitha, one of the 13 Zulu chiefs, led a force against Cetshwayo and on 22 July 1883 defeated him in Ulundi. Cetshwayo escaped injured but died in February 1884, leaving his son Dinuzulu to inherit the throne. He ultimately succeeded in driving out Zibhebhu with the help of Transvaal Boers.

Dinuzulu rebelled against the British in 1888 but was defeated and fled to the Transvaal. He gave himself up in November 1888, and he and his uncles Ndabuko and Tshingana were found guilty of high treason in April 1889 and exiled to St Helena. Bishop Colenso's daughter, Harriette, intervened on their behalf in London. On her return to Zululand in August 1893, Clarke invited her to his residence in Etshowe. While there, she was visited by Zulu from across the land. The Zulu people had great affection for Bishop Colenso and his daughter. She persuaded them that Clarke's appointment was beneficial to them and they gave Clarke the nickname 'uKwezi', meaning 'Keeper' or 'Protector'. A sign of this was the release of a number of Dinzulu's followers from prison.

In his first year in office, Clarke established good order in the colony. Unlike Osborn, who treated Colenso's presence at the trials in 1888 as an affront, Clarke took up Colenso's cause and recommended to the Colonial Office in London that Dinuzulu and his uncles be allowed to return from exile, having been sufficiently punished for his supposed offences. Clarke, persuaded by Colenso, argued that Dinuzulu would not cause further trouble so long as the policy of fomenting intertribal strife were discontinued and Dinuzulu be appointed induna. He began the process for the return of Dinuzulu and sought to harness the authority of the Zulu leader to the administration. In January 1895, the exiles received notice of their return to Zululand with an official position for Dinuzulu. Their departure was set for February 1895 but was delayed after Ministers in London recommended that Zululand first be annexed to Natal.

Clarke's tenure marked a difference in policy: instead of trying to divide and rule and undermine the power of the hereditary chiefs, he granted considerable authority to them. He applied a similar approach to that of his previous work in Basutoland. His view was that the native people were "better able to manage their own affairs than we can do it for them, though they need our help in international matters and in matters between white and black." He gave special judicial functions to Hlubi of the Basotho, Mehlokazulu of the Ngobese and Mpiyakhe of the Mdlalose, enabling them to try certain cases referred to them by Resident Magistrates. In 1895, according to Harriette Colenso, the Zulu people approved of direct rule with Clarke as Resident Commissioner. However, when Clarke was appointed Resident Commissioner in Rhodesia in 1898, Charles Saunders replaced him and he bowed to pressure from settlers and officials to minimise Dinuzulu's influence over the Zulu people, especially during the Second Boer War.

Clarke had to deal with four natural disasters during his tenure. An outbreak of smallpox in 1894 was the result of labour migration and men returning from working in Witwatersrand. When it proved too costly for the people, he waived the charge for the vaccination. Locust swarms in 1894 and 1895 caused damage to crops and resulted in famine in 1896. The government response was to offer the chief of each tribe a reward of 3 d for every muid of locusts collected as well as cattle to slaughter when a swarm was eradicated. At the same time, Clarke bought 1,090 muids of quick-growing mealies to be given on payment to families requiring immediate relief, a measure of which Sir Walter Hely-Hutchinson, Governor of Natal, approved: "It is better to err on the side of unnecessary expenditure than to run the risk of exposing the people to starvation." Finally, in 1897, an outbreak of rinderpest killed many cattle and the government responded with a programme of inoculation.

== Southern Rhodesia (1898–1905) ==
As a result of the debacle of the Jameson Raid in the winter of 1895–1896, the imperial government determined by order in council to appoint a permanent Resident Commissioner to supervise the affairs of the British South Africa Company in Southern Rhodesia. Joseph Chamberlain, Secretary of State for the Colonies, offered the role to Clarke, whose impressive prior administrative career was an indication of the importance being placed on the role. Graham Bower, the imperial secretary, wrote recommending him for the role: "Clarke is far and away the best man in this country". Clarke was in post from 1898 to 1905, reporting directly to Alfred Milner, the High Commissioner for Southern Africa based in Johannesburg, who in turn reported to the Colonial Office in London. His role was to safeguard the interests of the natives and to call on the High Commissioner for interference where he saw fit. The Aborigines Protection Society in London approved of his appointment, stating in its annual report of 1900 that he had a "rare capacity for dealing justly with native communities".

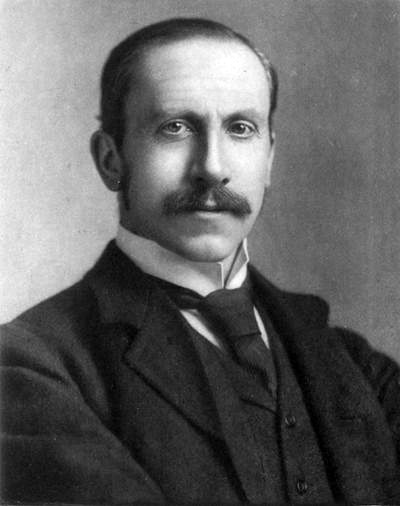
Alfred Milner, 1st Viscount Milner

From the outset of his posting, Clarke had to deal with issues regarding land and labour. The latter was of major significance at this time in Southern Rhodesia. In response to questioning by the African Association and the Manchester Society for the Protection of Native Races, Chamberlain in 1898 responded that forced labour was not permitted. A year later, Chamberlain was concerned by a chief native commissioner instructing chiefs at an indaba that it was their duty to supply labour. Clarke's subsequent report accused officials of the administration of requisitioning labour by 'pressure only short of force', causing 'discontent amongst the natives'. Clarke's view was that a mutually beneficial relationship between capital and labour was possible through market forces alone, without additional pressure. Chamberlain agreed, although Milner was in favour of compulsory labour even to the extent of 'recommending the corvée'.

Towards the end of 1899, the Second Boer War gave Clarke cause for concern and he requested aid from Britain for the defence of Rhodesia. He was particularly concerned with the possibility of Africans avenging their recent defeat in the Second Matabele War by joining forces against the government. So, along with the native commissioners, he summoned and addressed indabas around the country to reassure the Africans that they would be protected and would not be called to fight, so could continue to pursue their peaceful occupations as normal. During this time, Africans deserted the mines, keeping their options open and "watching events".

The administration in 1901 proposed a scheme similar to that of the Glen Grey Act, imposing a tax of £2 to induce natives to work. In 1903, Rhodesian capitalists even proposed a £4 tax but Chamberlain preferred the lower rate of £2 and sought Clarke's opinion on its potential to cause trouble. Clarke argued that even £2 was too high. Milner disagreed and wrote to Sir William Milton, the company administrator, saying: 'I am embarrassed by a report form the Resident Commissioner in which he utterly condemns the proposed Native Tax Ordinance'. In 1904, finally, Alfred Lyttelton, Chamberlain's successor refused assent, citing Clarke's reports and an ordinance limited the tax to £1.

In the meantime, in 1902, Scott, a native commissioner, brought to Clarke's attention that many work-seekers were suffering great privation yet were unable to find work while some businesses were short of labour. Clarke took up the cause: 'This indicates the necessity of the organisation of an Association for bringing those wanting labour and those seeking employment into contact and prevent, what I have myself seen, gangs of destitute natives wandering about the country.' In 1903, a Rhodesian Native Labour Bureau was proposed.

Clarke was a critic of migrant labour schemes, which were designed to attract foreign labour to Rhodesia, and in 1900 he defended the rights of indigenous labour against infringement by foreign Africans from Mozambique, Nyasaland, Zambia and South Africa. As early as 1900, the BSAC came to the Colonial Office with a proposal regarding Chinese labour. In London, the Land and Mine Owners Association was formed in 1902 to lobby the Colonial Office and continued to press throughout 1903. The Colonial Office postponed its decision saying that the question concerned not only Rhodesia but all of southern Africa. Milner was lobbied by the BSAC and he promised his support. Clarke, however, dismissed the demands, arguing that 'the introduction of large numbers of Asiatics... will subject the aboriginal natives to unfair competition'. He forecast that the labour shortage was temporary and that the new bureau would satisfy demand. Clarke also argued that most Rhodesians were opposed to the introduction of Chinese labour. The Duke of Marlborough, then Permanent Under-Secretary of State for the Colonies, recorded that he found Clarke's argument more convincing than Milner's, and the Colonial Office refused the proposal.

After serving in office for an extra year to 1905, Clarke retired, having helped to create a better system for the benefit of all. While the Colonial Office sought to mediate conflicts of interest, its impact was varied due to its desire to avoid expense. Milner was preoccupied with his vision of a new South Africa incorporating Southern Rhodesia, for which he needed the support of the BSAC. He appears to have had respect for Clarke, although he seems to have resented his influence at the Colonial Office, denying him an increase in salary or an official secretary. On Clarke's retirement, Milner wrote 'Personally I hardly think the office of Resident Commissioner any longer necessary'.

Arthur Cripps, the Anglican missionary and supporter of the rights of natives, said at the end of the BSAC era:

Southern Rhodesian natives have surely had much in past years to thank a succession of Imperial Representatives for, Resident Commissioners, to whom the first of their number, Sir Marshal Clarke, handed on a fine tradition.

== Honours ==
He was invested as a Companion of the Order of St Michael and St George in April 1880, and promoted to Knight Commander in 1886.

He was granted authority to wear the insignia of the Third Class of the Order of the Medjidieh in November 1883 conferred on him by Tewfik Pasha, Khedive of Egypt, as authorised by Abdul Hamid II, Sultan of the Ottoman Empire, in recognition of his services in the employ of the Khedive.

== Personal life ==
Clarke married Annie Stacy Lloyd, eldest daughter of Major General Banastyre Pryce Lloyd in 1880 and had three children: Elizabeth Clarke (17 June 1885 – 26 July 1952), Admiral Sir Marshal Llewelyn Clarke KBE CB DSC (9 May 1887 – 8 April 1959) and Captain Brian Lloyd Clarke (30 September 1888 – 19 April 1915).

H. Rider Haggard was a friend of Clarke's and he dedicated Swallow, his story of the Boer Great Trek of 1836, to him: "...I hope that you will accept these pages in memory of past time and friendship, and more especially for the providential events connected with a night-long ride which once we took on duty together..."

Clarke died suddenly on 1 April 1909 of pneumonia at The Lodge, Enniskerry, County Wicklow, Ireland.

== See also ==
- Company rule in Rhodesia
- British South Africa Company
- Administrative posts of the British South Africa Company in Southern Rhodesia
- Basutoland
- Zulu Kingdom

Political offices
Preceded by new post	Resident Commissioner in Southern Rhodesia; 1898 – 1905	Succeeded by Richard Chester-Master
Preceded by Sir Melmoth Osborn	Resident Commissioner in Zululand; 1893 – 1898	Succeeded by Charles Saunders
Preceded by new post	Resident Commissioner in Basutoland; 1884 – 1893	Succeeded by Godfrey Yeatman Lagden
