= Mkuze =

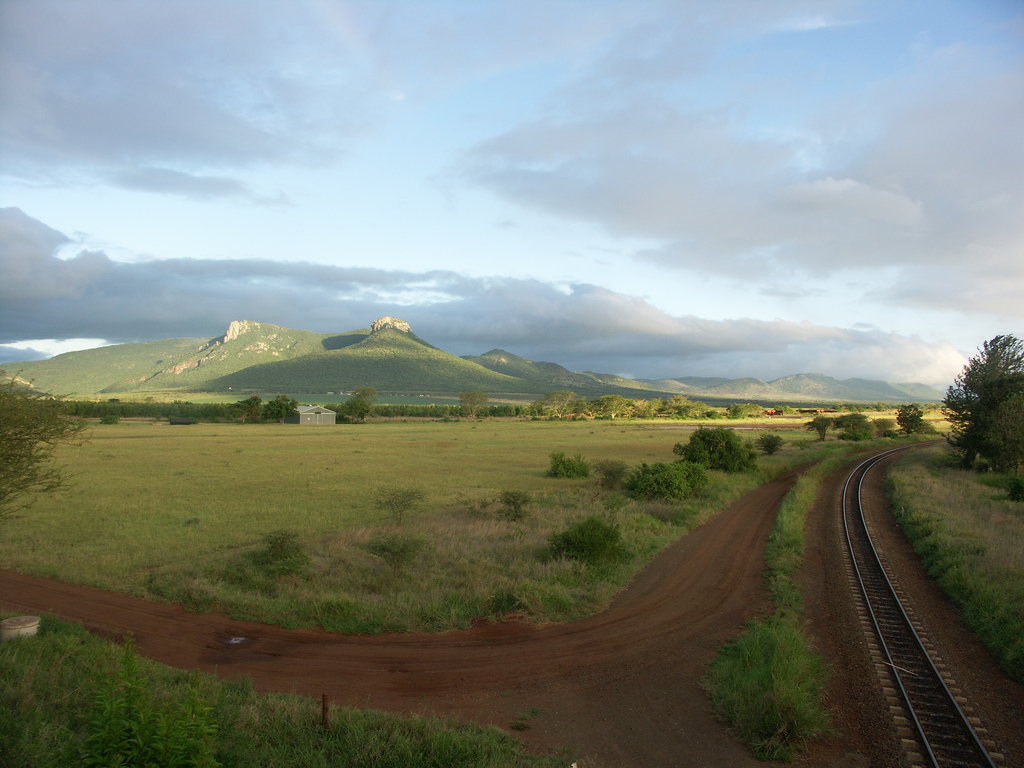
- Ghost Mountain, overlooking Mkuze. In the foreground is Mkuze airstrip (ICAO: FAMU).

- Location within KwaZulu-Natal Location within South Africa
- Coordinates: 27°37′S 32°02′E
- Country: South Africa
- Province: KwaZulu-Natal
- District: uMkhanyakude
- Municipality: Jozini

Area
  - Total: 4.96 km^{2} (1.92 sq mi)

Population (2023)
  - Total: 32,637
  - Density: 6,580/km^{2} (17,000/sq mi)

Racial makeup (2011)
  - Black African: 92.8%
  - Coloured: 0.5%
  - Indian/Asian: 1.1%
  - White: 4.5%
  - Other: 1.1%

First languages (2011)
  - Zulu: 91.2%
  - English: 3.1%
  - Other: 5.7%
- Time zone: UTC+2 (SAST)
- PO box: 3965
- Area code: 035

Mkuze, also named Mkhuze or uMkhuze is a small town in Northern KwaZulu-Natal, South Africa. It is located approximately 350 km from the city of Durban. It is along the N2 road en route to Ermelo; between the Mkuze River and Intaba Yemikhovu (Ghost Mountain). Mkuze is some distance from other small towns such as Hluhluwe (50 km), Nongoma (76 km), Pongola (65 km), and Jozini (25 km). Mkuze is the seat of Umkhanyakude District Municipality.

== Population and culture ==
About 50,000 people reside in the small town of Mkuze. As part of the KwaZulu-Natal province, the two official languages of Mkuze (which means "Chorus master" in isiZulu) are Zulu and English.

== Mkuze (uMkhuze) Game Reserve ==
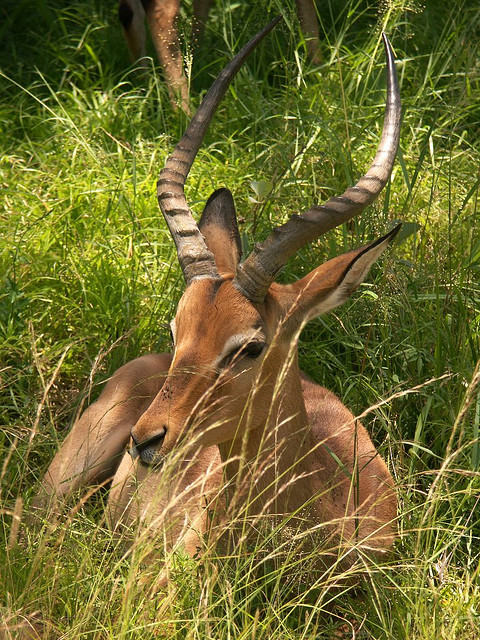
An impala, in Mkuze game reserve

Mkuze Game Reserve has a large variety of natural habitats: from the eastern slopes of the Lebombo Mountains along its eastern boundary, to broad stretches of acacia savannah, swamps and a variety of woodlands and riverine forest. A rare type of sand forest also occurs in the reserve. It is renowned among ornithologists, with more than 420 different bird species on record. The Mkuze River curves along the Mkuze Game Reserve's northern and eastern borders with a stretch of fig forest along its banks. Fish eagles swoop over the pans, snatching prey spotted from their perches in the fever trees.

== Ghost Mountain ==
Mkuze is overlooked by Ghost Mountain, which is also the site of Dinuzulu's 1884 battle with rival Usibepu. This mountain is said to be the tombs of the previous chiefs of the mountain and, according to legend, it has been the scene of a number of bloody fights. It is said that Intaba Yemikhovu is where the King Dingaan was killed by the King Shaka's son Mhlophekazi who was known as Mbophe's son, even though it is believed he died near Tugela river. With its dramatic silhouette, in the shape of an old woman or witch head, it is not difficult to understand why the mountain is said to be haunted and to be the theatre of paranormal activities.

== Economy ==
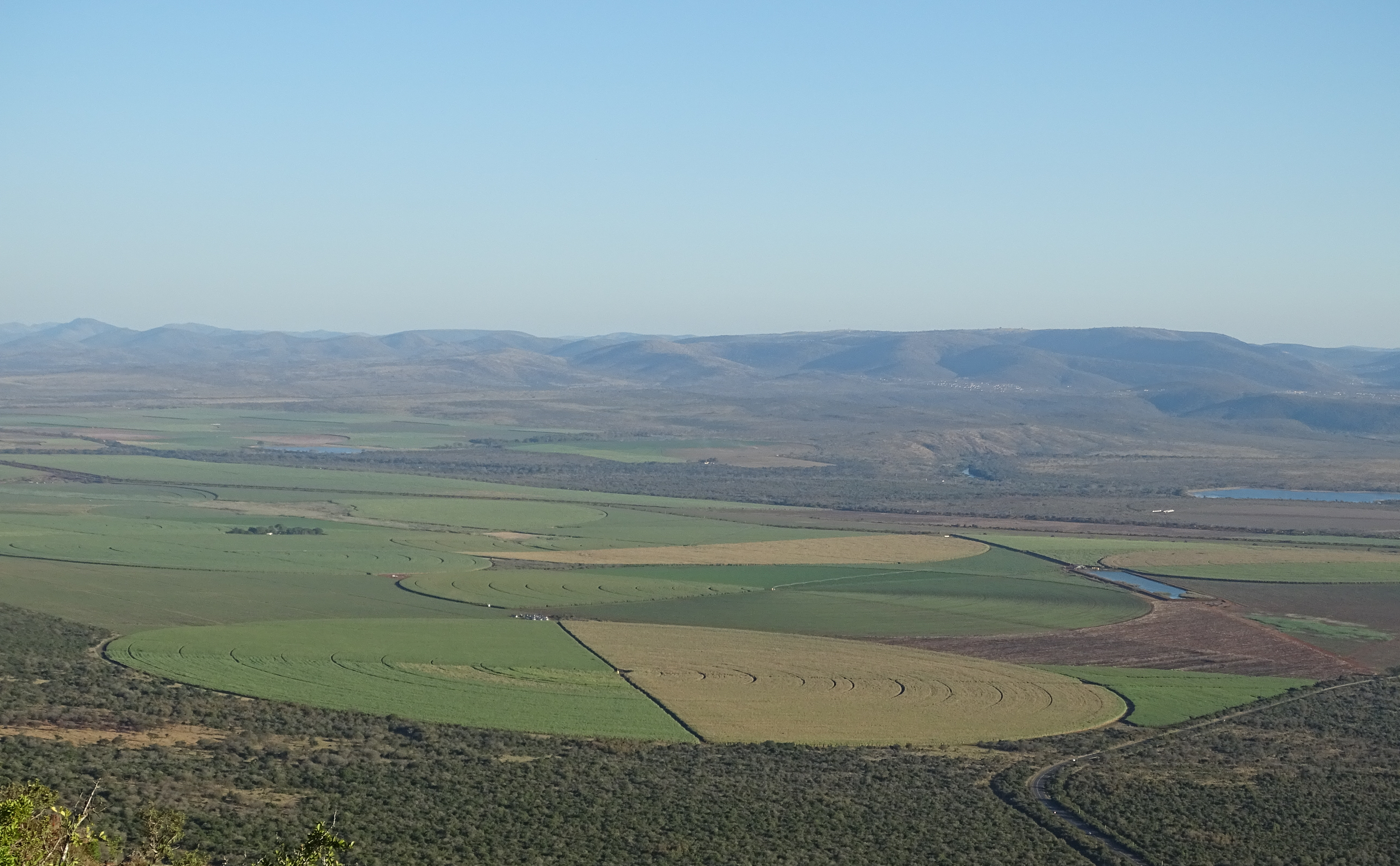
Sugar cane plantation in Mkuze

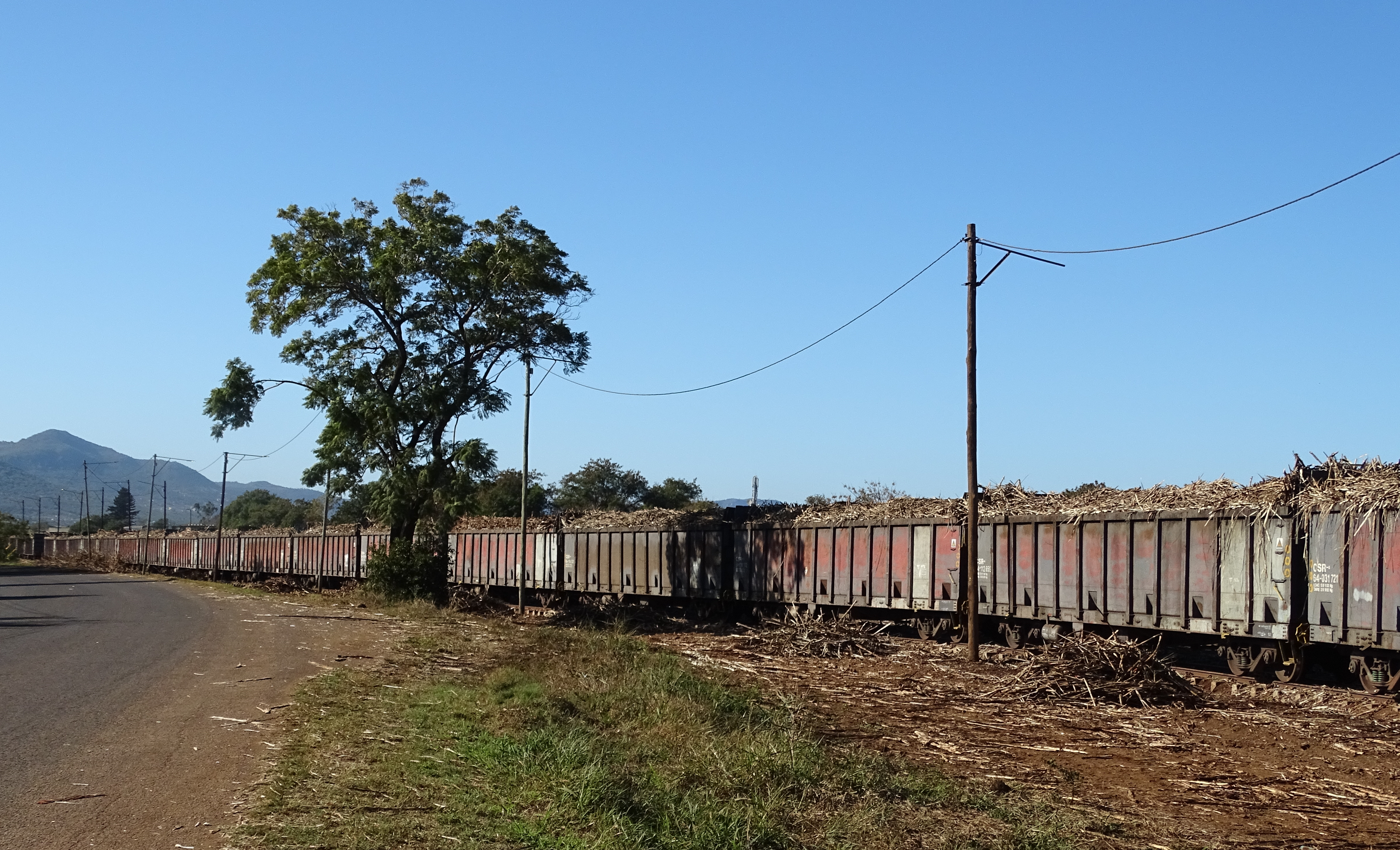
Sugar train in Mkuze

Mkuze is a farming community with concentrated sugar cane crops as well as isolated forest plantations. In the 1980s cotton farming was a source of employment to villages around the town. With cotton processing firms ceasing to operate, some of these farms have been converted to cattle farming.

The Mkuze Game Reserve and its associated businesses are found near Mkuze.

Mkuze is on the freight railway line which runs from Eswatini to Durban. Its airfield is approximated to be 2.5 km long. Villagers commute mainly by vans (or bakkies) to and from town.

There are several game parks such as the Thanda Private Game Reserve, Nsubane Pongola Transfrontier Conservation Area and the Phinda Resource Reserve close to Mkuze. Visitors to Mkuze can also find accommodation at Banghoek, Msunduze, Baobab (Bayala) and Inyala Game Lodge.

== Communities ==
There are not many townhouses or other accommodation available in Mkuze. Communities that Mkuze supports includes villages at Ubombo, Enkukhwini, Tshaneni, Mhlekazi, Enhlohlela, Ezimbidleni (of which the furthest is approximately 35 km), as well as the surrounding farms. Umlingo Village is a low cost housing development in town.

The most popular senior secondary schools around the town includes Mmemezi High (Mhlekazi), Mdolomba (Ezimbidleni), Mangwazana (Ubombo), Madlaka High (Tshaneni), Sandlasenkosi (Tshaneni) and Mthwazi High which is in town. Popular primary schools includes Tshaneni (Tshaneni), Sambulo (Tshaneni), Ezimbidleni (Ezimbidleni), Mhlekazi (Mhlekazi), Bhekimkhonto (Mhlekazi South of Mpungamlilo), Velakukhanya (Ezimbidleni West or Ehlanzeni), and Mkuze Primary School is the only multi-racial school in town.

The Mkuze Country Club provides examination facilities for long distance education institutions such as the University of South Africa (Unisa).
