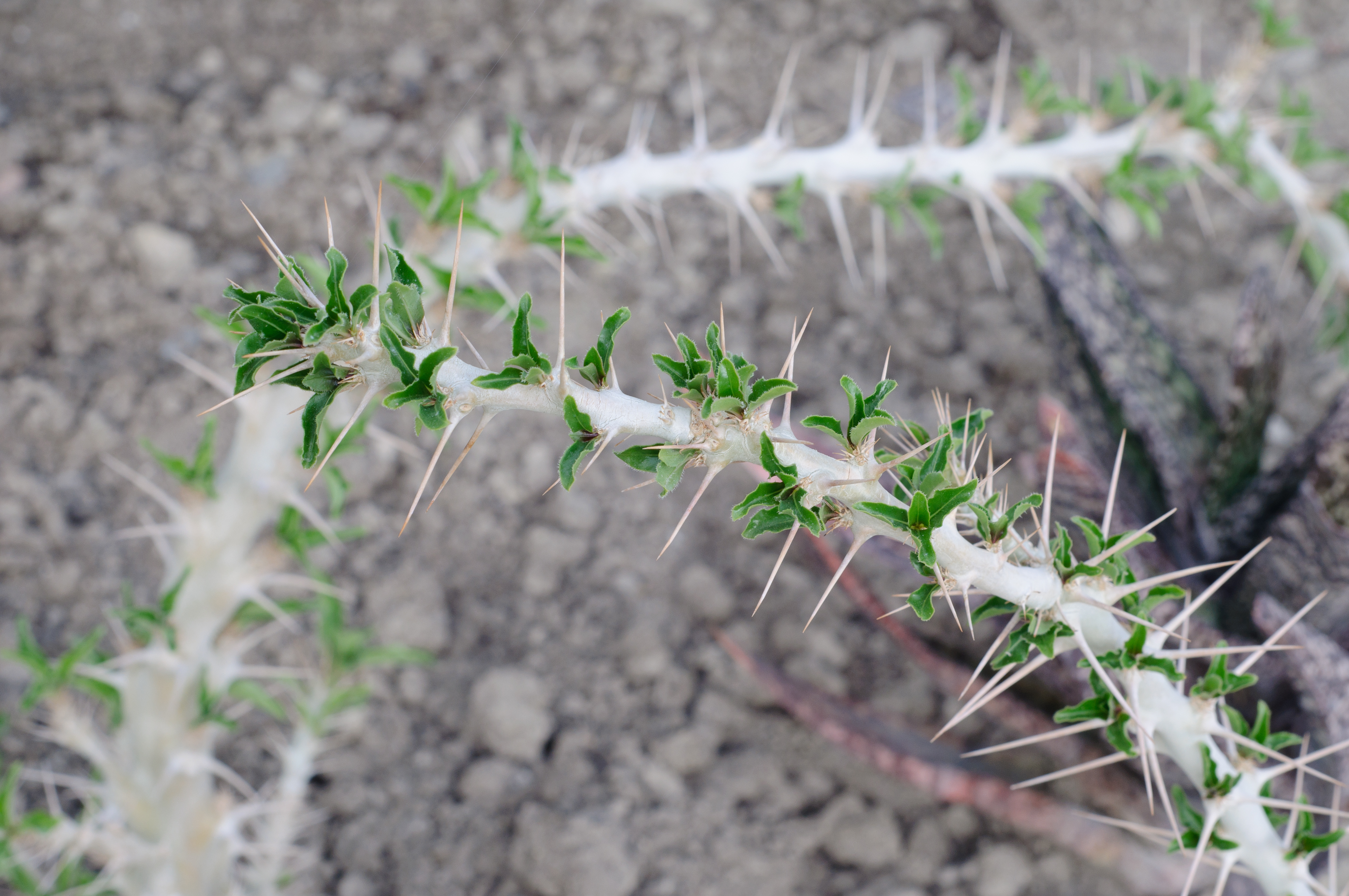

Scientific classification
- Kingdom: Plantae
- Clade: Embryophytes
- Clade: Tracheophytes
- Clade: Spermatophytes
- Clade: Angiosperms
- Clade: Eudicots
- Clade: Asterids
- Order: Gentianales
- Family: Apocynaceae
- Genus: Pachypodium
- Species: P. saundersii

Binomial name
- Pachypodium saundersii N.E.Br.
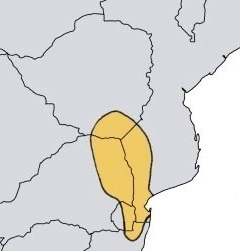
- range of P. saundersii

= Pachypodium saundersii =

Kudu lily

Species of succulent

Pachypodium saundersii, the kudu lily, is a succulent plant of the family Apocynaceae. It was named in honour of Sir Charles James Renault Saunders (1857–1931), the Natal Province civil servant and casual plant collector.

It is found naturally in Southern Africa, on the Lebombo Mountains and adjacent lowveld areas of Zimbabwe, Mozambique, Eswatini, and South Africa (Limpopo, Mpumalanga and KwaZulu-Natal provinces).

It is usually a small, shrubby bush, but can grow up to 1.5m tall. The plant is covered in paired, sharp spines (modified stipules), and dark green shiny leaves, and it flowers annually producing masses of white flowers that have a pinkish/purplish tinge to them.

== Gallery ==
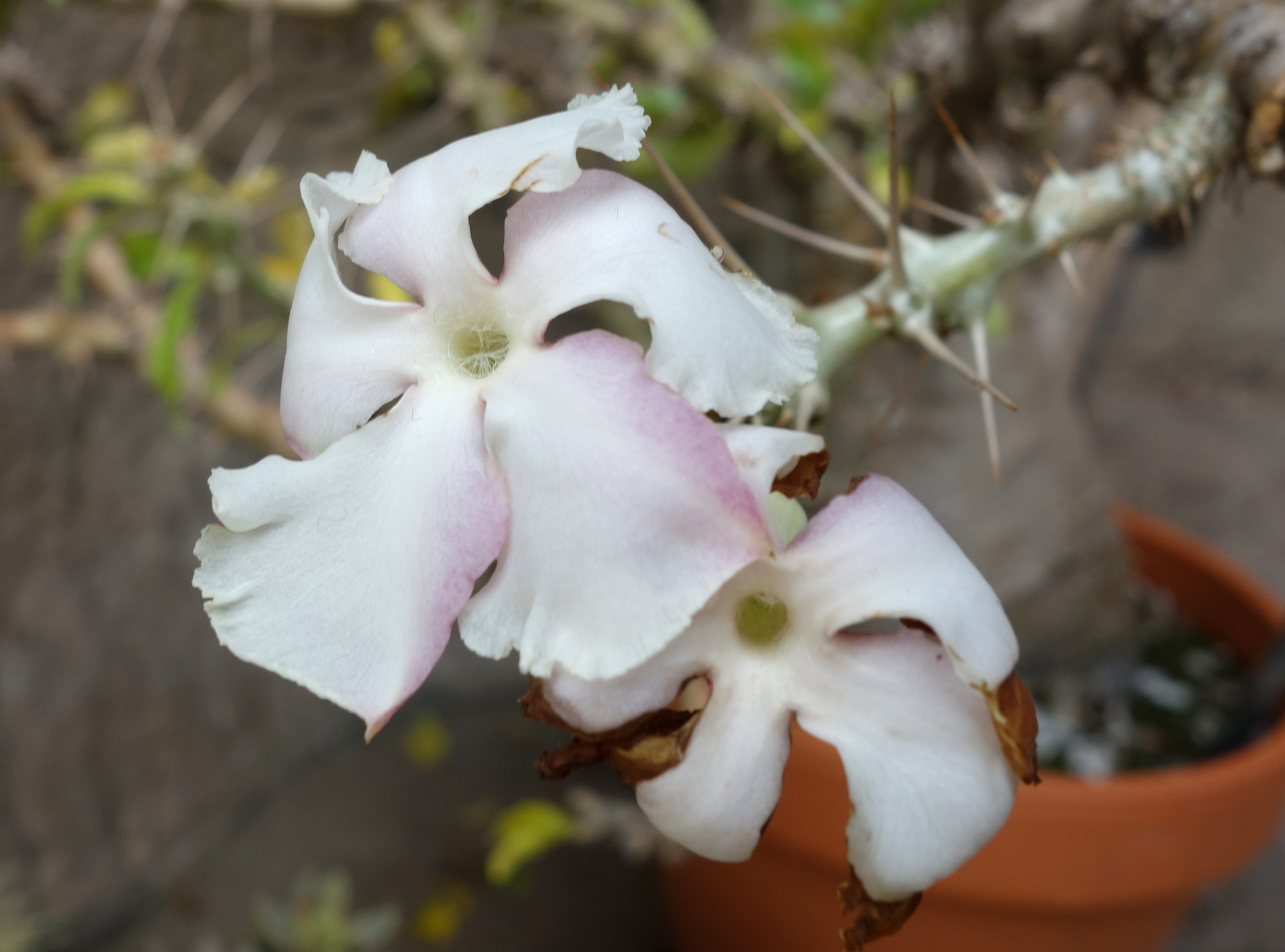
flowers in cultivation

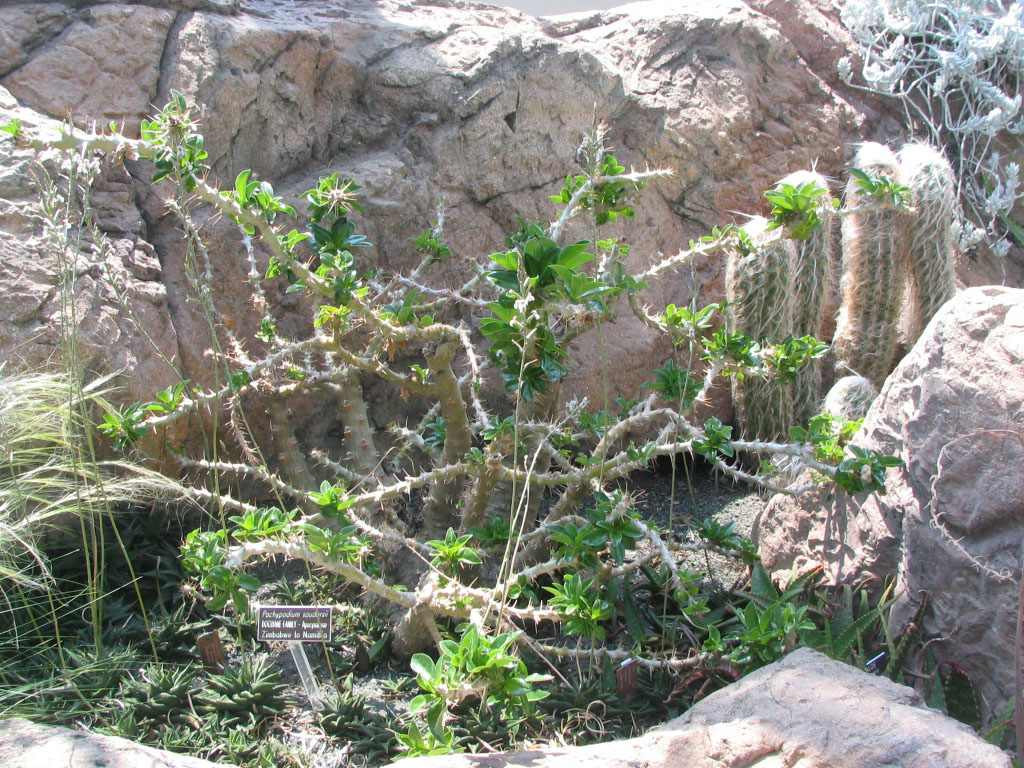
habit in cultivation
