= Charles Saunders (colonial administrator) =

South African colonial civil servant

Sir Charles Saunders
- Born: Charles James Renault Saunders; 17 October 1857; Tongaat, Colony of Natal
- Died: 11 January 1931 (aged 73); Melmoth, Natal, South Africa
- Other names: uMashiqela
- Occupation: Civil servant

Sir Charles James Renault Saunders KCMG (17 October 1857 – 11 January 1931) was a South African colonial civil servant who served as the Resident Commissioner and Chief Magistrate of Zululand. He was responsible for the annexation of the territory in Southern Africa then called Maputaland or Tongaland (now called Southern Maputaland or the Elephant coast of KwaZulu-Natal). He set up magistracies in Ubombo and Ingwavuma.

He was the son of James Renault Saunders, an important sugar plantation owner of Tongaat in Natal and of Katharine Saunders, plant collector and botanical artist in the Colony of Natal. Like his mother, Sir Charles collected plants and a number of species are named after him, including Pachypodium saundersii and Ornithogalum saundersiae. 426 plants were contributed to Kew Gardens between 1881 and 1889. 16 plant species were named in honour of Katherine Saunders and family members by Kew Gardens.

"Sir Charles was among the important public servants in Natal, a Zulu linguist of note and an authority on Zulu law and custom. 1876 Saunders became and administrator of native law. In 1887 he went to Tongoland and there ratified a treaty between the ruler and the British government. In the following years he was directed to define the boundary between Tongaland and Zululand, and in 1895 he took over the Ingwavuma district for the British crown. When Zululand was annexed to Natal in 1897 he became chief magistrate of the territory. He was Knighted in 1907 and retired from the public service before the Union. The Zulus called him uMashiqela, meaning the autocrat, and by his work over thirty years he was one of the men who made Natal."

Kathleen Carola (died 1945), only daughter of the Lady Saunders of Melmoth and Sir Charles Saunders, married Philip Edward Laughton of Dundee.

Sir Charles Saunders is buried in Eshowe.
