= Jozini Local Municipality elections =

Local elections in KwaZulu-Natal, South Africa

The Jozini Local Municipality council, in the KwaZulu-Natal province of South Africa, consists of forty-nine members elected by mixed-member proportional representation. Twenty-five councillors are elected by first-past-the-post voting in twenty-five wards, while the remaining twenty-four are chosen from party lists so that the total number of party representatives is proportional to the number of votes received.

In the election of 4 November 2026 no party obtained a majority. The Inkatha Freedom Party (IFP) received the most seats with eighteen.

== Results ==
The following table shows the composition of the council after past elections.

Event	ANC	DA	EFF	IFP	MKP	Other	Total
2000 election	5	—	—	27	—	0	32
2006 election	8	1	—	24	—	0	33
2011 election	20	0	—	16	—	4	40
2016 election	19	1	1	18	—	1	40
2021 election	16	0	2	24	—	3	45
2026 election	13	0	1	18	15	2	49

== December 2000 election ==
The following table shows the results of the 2000 election.

Party	Ward			List			Total seats
Party	Votes	%	Seats	Votes	%	Seats	Total seats
Inkatha Freedom Party	25,182	84.78	15	25,244	84.84	12	27
African National Congress	4,442	14.95	1	4,511	15.16	4	5
Independent candidates	79	0.27	0				0
Total	29,703	100.00	16	29,755	100.00	16	32
Valid votes	29,703	97.47		29,755	97.58		
Invalid/blank votes	772	2.53		738	2.42		
Total votes	30,475	100.00		30,493	100.00		
Registered voters/turnout	55,910	54.51		55,910	54.54		

== March 2006 election ==
The following table shows the results of the 2006 election.

Party	Ward			List			Total seats
Party	Votes	%	Seats	Votes	%	Seats	Total seats
Inkatha Freedom Party	26,652	73.37	16	26,662	73.43	8	24
African National Congress	8,828	24.30	1	9,012	24.82	7	8
Democratic Alliance	659	1.81	0	637	1.75	1	1
Independent candidates	186	0.51	0				0
Total	36,325	100.00	17	36,311	100.00	16	33
Valid votes	36,325	98.06		36,311	98.14		
Invalid/blank votes	720	1.94		688	1.86		
Total votes	37,045	100.00		36,999	100.00		
Registered voters/turnout	64,953	57.03		64,953	56.96		

== May 2011 election ==
The following table shows the results of the 2011 election.

Party	Ward			List			Total seats
Party	Votes	%	Seats	Votes	%	Seats	Total seats
African National Congress	24,448	49.57	13	24,704	50.11	7	20
Inkatha Freedom Party	19,618	39.78	7	19,413	39.38	9	16
National Freedom Party	4,874	9.88	0	4,689	9.51	4	4
Democratic Alliance	59	0.12	0	278	0.56	0	0
African Christian Democratic Party	218	0.44	0	96	0.19	0	0
Federal Congress	53	0.11	0	80	0.16	0	0
South African Democratic Congress	6	0.01	0	39	0.08	0	0
Independent candidates	43	0.09	0				0
Total	49,319	100.00	20	49,299	100.00	20	40
Valid votes	49,319	98.86		49,299	98.74		
Invalid/blank votes	569	1.14		630	1.26		
Total votes	49,888	100.00		49,929	100.00		
Registered voters/turnout	79,143	63.04		79,143	63.09		

== August 2016 election ==
The following table shows the results of the 2016 election.

Party	Ward			List			Total seats
Party	Votes	%	Seats	Votes	%	Seats	Total seats
African National Congress	28,352	46.76	10	29,676	48.99	9	19
Inkatha Freedom Party	27,774	45.81	9	28,201	46.56	9	18
Economic Freedom Fighters	1,242	2.05	0	1,173	1.94	1	1
Independent candidates	2,303	3.80	1				1
Democratic Alliance	935	1.54	0	886	1.46	1	1
Isithunzi Som-Afrika Econo Fighters				420	0.69	0	0
Christian Democratic Party	27	0.04	0	215	0.35	0	0
Total	60,633	100.00	20	60,571	100.00	20	40
Valid votes	60,633	98.51		60,571	98.37		
Invalid/blank votes	920	1.49		1,001	1.63		
Total votes	61,553	100.00		61,572	100.00		
Registered voters/turnout	95,445	64.49		95,445	64.51		

=== August 2016 to November 2021 by-elections ===
The IFP, DA and EFF later gained an outright majority following a by-election held on 4 April 2018 in which a ward previously held by an ANC councillor was won by the IFP candidate. Council composition was reconfigured as seen below:

Party	Ward	PR list	Total
Inkatha Freedom Party	10	9	19
African National Congress	9	9	18
DA	0	1	1
Economic Freedom Fighters	0	1	1
Independent	1	–	1
Total	20	20	40

== November 2021 election ==
The following table shows the results of the 2021 election.

Party	Ward			List			Total seats
Party	Votes	%	Seats	Votes	%	Seats	Total seats
Inkatha Freedom Party	31,073	50.56	19	32,556	53.64	5	24
African National Congress	20,739	33.74	2	22,253	36.66	14	16
Economic Freedom Fighters	2,617	4.26	0	2,884	4.75	2	2
Independent candidates	5,485	8.92	2				2
Academic Congress Union				981	1.62	1	1
Democratic Alliance	340	0.55	0	348	0.57	0	0
National Freedom Party	290	0.47	0	356	0.59	0	0
United Christian Democratic Party	264	0.43	0	244	0.40	0	0
Independent Alliance	56	0.09	0	421	0.69	0	0
African Transformation Movement	190	0.31	0	224	0.37	0	0
Abantu Batho Congress	123	0.20	0	138	0.23	0	0
United Democratic Movement	103	0.17	0	105	0.17	0	0
African Christian Democratic Party	64	0.10	0	94	0.15	0	0
National People's Front	78	0.13	0	48	0.08	0	0
Black First Land First	31	0.05	0	21	0.03	0	0
Democratic Union Plus	9	0.01	0	20	0.03	0	0
Total	61,462	100.00	23	60,693	100.00	22	45
Valid votes	61,462	98.74		60,693	97.83		
Invalid/blank votes	784	1.26		1,344	2.17		
Total votes	62,246	100.00		62,037	100.00		
Registered voters/turnout	103,712	60.02		103,712	59.82		

== November 2026 election ==
The following table shows the results of the 2026 election.

Party	Ward			List			Total seats
Party	Votes	%	Seats	Votes	%	Seats	Total seats
Inkatha Freedom Party	24,281	34.88	8	24,650	35.62	10	18
uMkhonto weSizwe Party	19,999	28.73	11	20,349	29.41	4	15
African National Congress	18,334	26.34	6	18,088	26.14	7	13
Jozini Congress	3,266	4.69	0	3,110	4.49	2	2
Economic Freedom Fighters	1,278	1.84	0	1,176	1.70	1	1
Independent candidates	1,078	1.55	0				0
Democratic Alliance	231	0.33	0	290	0.42	0	0
National Community Liberation	255	0.37	0	239	0.35	0	0
Afrika Mayibuye Movement	204	0.29	0	184	0.27	0	0
South African Communist Party	170	0.24	0	201	0.29	0	0
Service Delivery Party	76	0.11	0	226	0.33	0	0
African Economic Freedom	77	0.11	0	106	0.15	0	0
Gods Justice and Development Party	64	0.09	0	110	0.16	0	0
United Democratic Movement	64	0.09	0	56	0.08	0	0
Pan Africanist Congress of Azania	65	0.09	0	51	0.07	0	0
United Christian Democratic Party	63	0.09	0	52	0.08	0	0
National Freedom Party	27	0.04	0	85	0.12	0	0
African Renaissance Unity	6	0.01	0	98	0.14	0	0
African Transformation Movement	22	0.03	0	74	0.11	0	0
African Christian Democratic Party	1	0.00	0	53	0.08	0	0
African Congress for Transformation	51	0.07	0				0
Total	69,612	100.00	25	69,198	100.00	24	49
Valid votes	69,612	98.82		69,198	98.70		
Invalid/blank votes	833	1.18		911	1.30		
Total votes	70,445	100.00		70,109	100.00		
Registered voters/turnout	121,222	58.11		121,222	57.84		
