= Cecil Macks Pass =

Mountain pass in KwaZulu-Natal

Coordinates: 27°04′24.3″S 32°00′03.5″E

Cecil Macks Pass is a mountain pass in the KwaZulu-Natal province of South Africa in the vicinity of Ingwavuma. It is located near the eSwatini border and is a known route for smuggling.

The pass is part of a "false poort" formed in the Lebombo Mountains by erosion from the Ngwavuma River.
