= Border Cave =

Rock shelter in South Africa

Border Cave, South Africa
- Border Cave
- Location within South Africa
- Length: 48 kilometres (30 mi)

Geography
- Coordinates: 27°01′30″S 31°59′20″E
- Interactive map of Border Cave, South Africa

Border Cave is an archaeological site located in the western Lebombo Mountains in Kwazulu-Natal. The rock shelter has one of the longest archaeological records in southern Africa, which spans from the Middle Stone Age to the Iron Age.

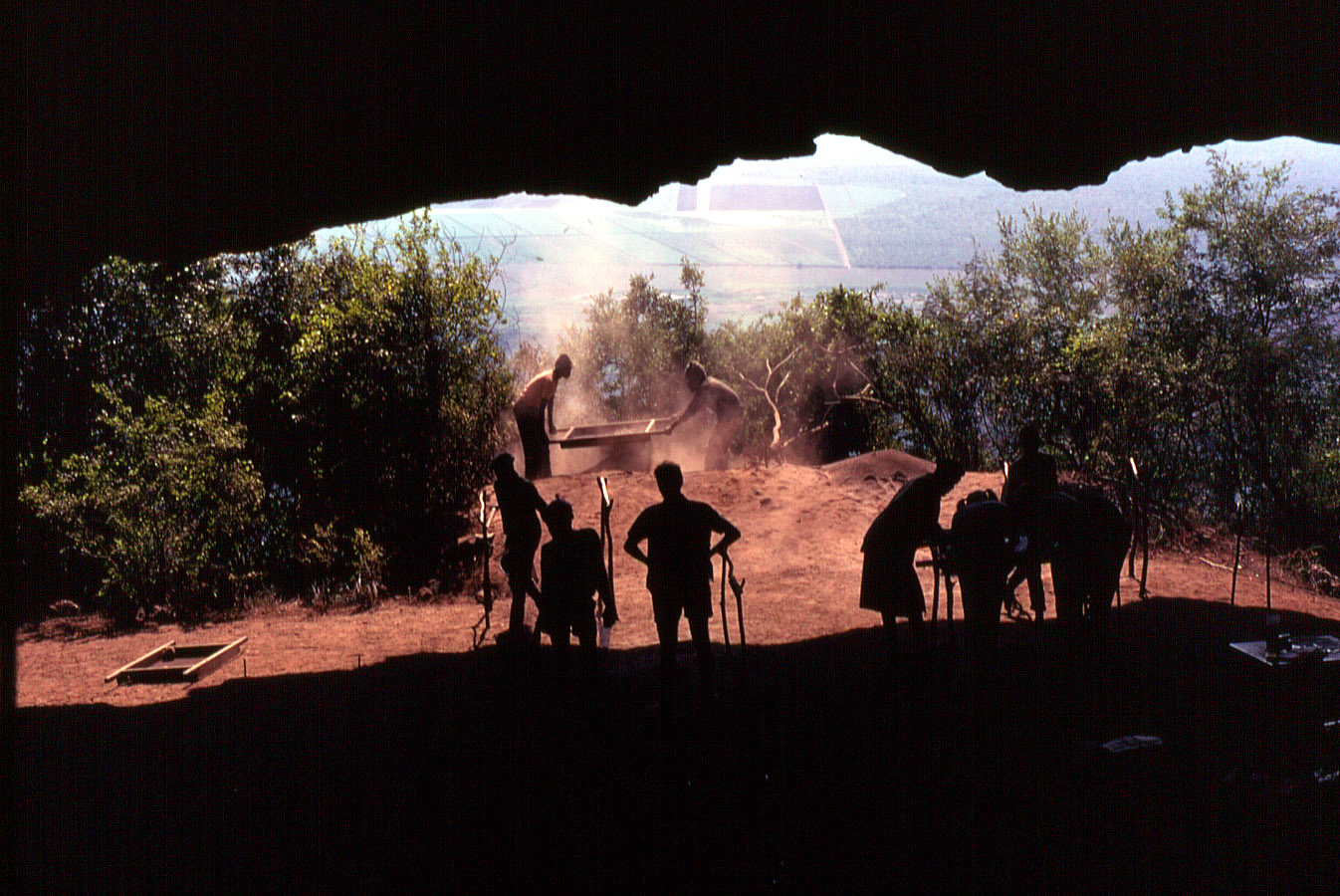
Border Cave Excavations

The west-facing cave is located about 100 m below the crest of the Lebombo mountain range. The variable rates of weathering of the Lebombo's Jurassic rocks led to the cave's formation.

Researchers have excavated at Border Cave since 1934. In chronological order, excavations occurred in 1934 (Raymond Dart), 1940 (W.E. Horton, non-scientific), 1941–1942 (Cooke, Malan and Wells), 1970–1975, and 1987 (Peter Beaumont). Lucinda Backwell and colleagues reopened the site in 2015, and are currently excavating and analyzing more archaeological materials. Researchers have used a combination of carbon-14 dating, amino acid racemisation, luminescence, and electron spin resonance to date the site's oldest deposits to ~250,000 years before present. Border Cave's remains include human remains, lithics, bone tools, botanical remains (i.e. grass bedding) and animal bones.

Border Cave's long occupational sequence makes the site an important location for studying prehistoric hunter-gatherer behavior and the causes and timing of the Middle to Later Stone Age transition. The site's human remains have led to debates on the timing of modern human origins in southern Africa. Some of the cave's other artifacts (i.e. bone points) have also played into researchers' debates on the origins of hunter-gatherer cultural adaptations and the appropriateness of ethnographic analogy in interpreting the archaeological record.

== Regional setting ==
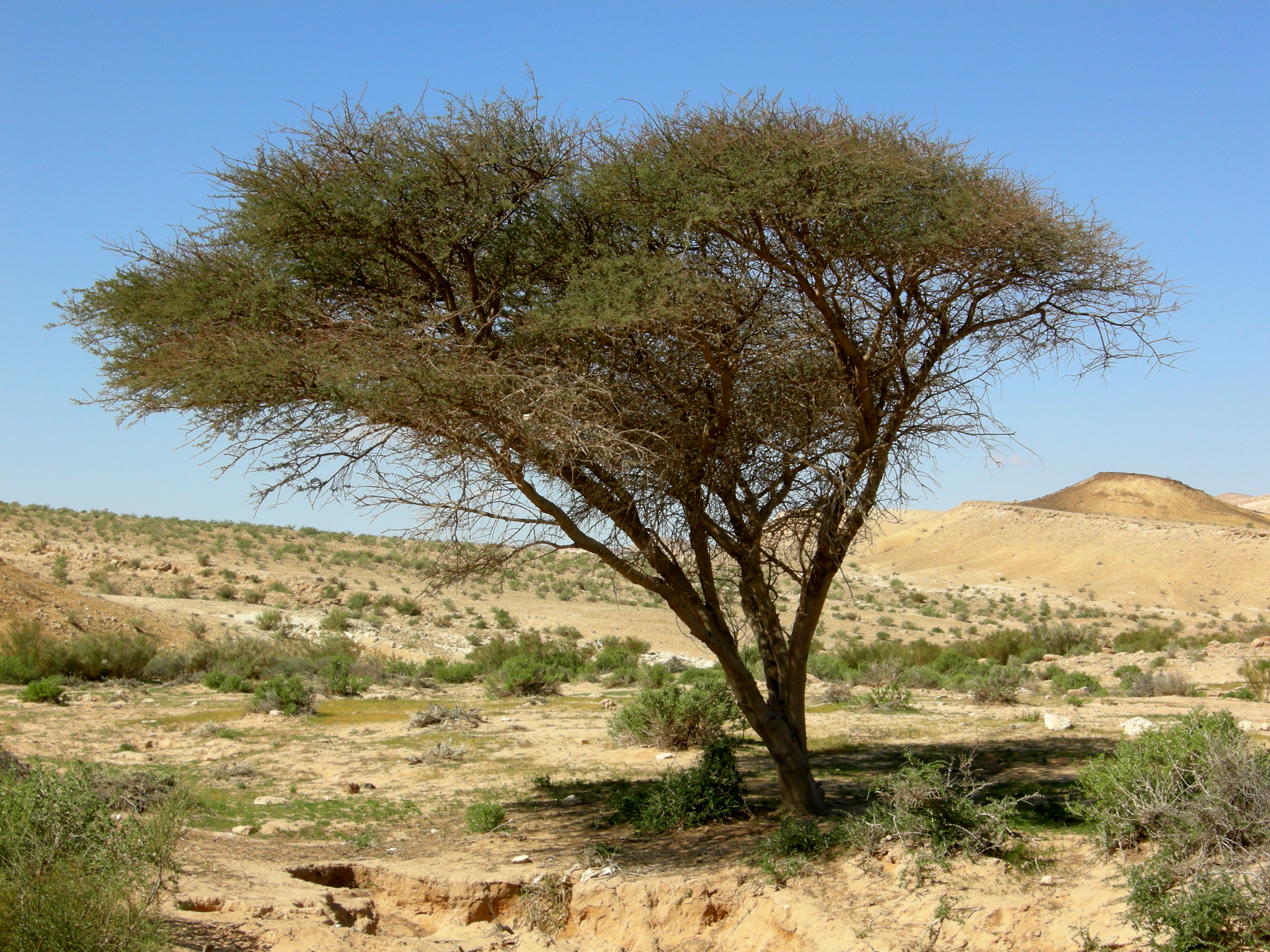
Acacia spp.

Border Cave is located at 27°01′19″S, 31°59′24″E within the Kwazulu region. The site is near the Eswatini/South Africa border at an altitude of 600 meters above sea level (masl). The mouth of the cave faces west over the Eswatini lowveld biome. The Jozini Rock Formation's Jurassic age rocks (182.1 ± 2.9 million years old) are the main types that make up the cave.

The main rivers near Border Cave include Usuthu, Ngwavuma, and Pongolo Rivers, which all flow from West to East. They all cut through the mountains and flow over horizontal beds of faulted rock. These rivers converge into Delagoa Bay. These rivers also erode certain areas of the Lebombo Mountains and cause differential weathering among the Karoo rocks (i.e. the Stormberg basalts and Ecca shales). Rhyolites, feldspar and quartz are common to the Border Cave region.

=== Modern environment ===
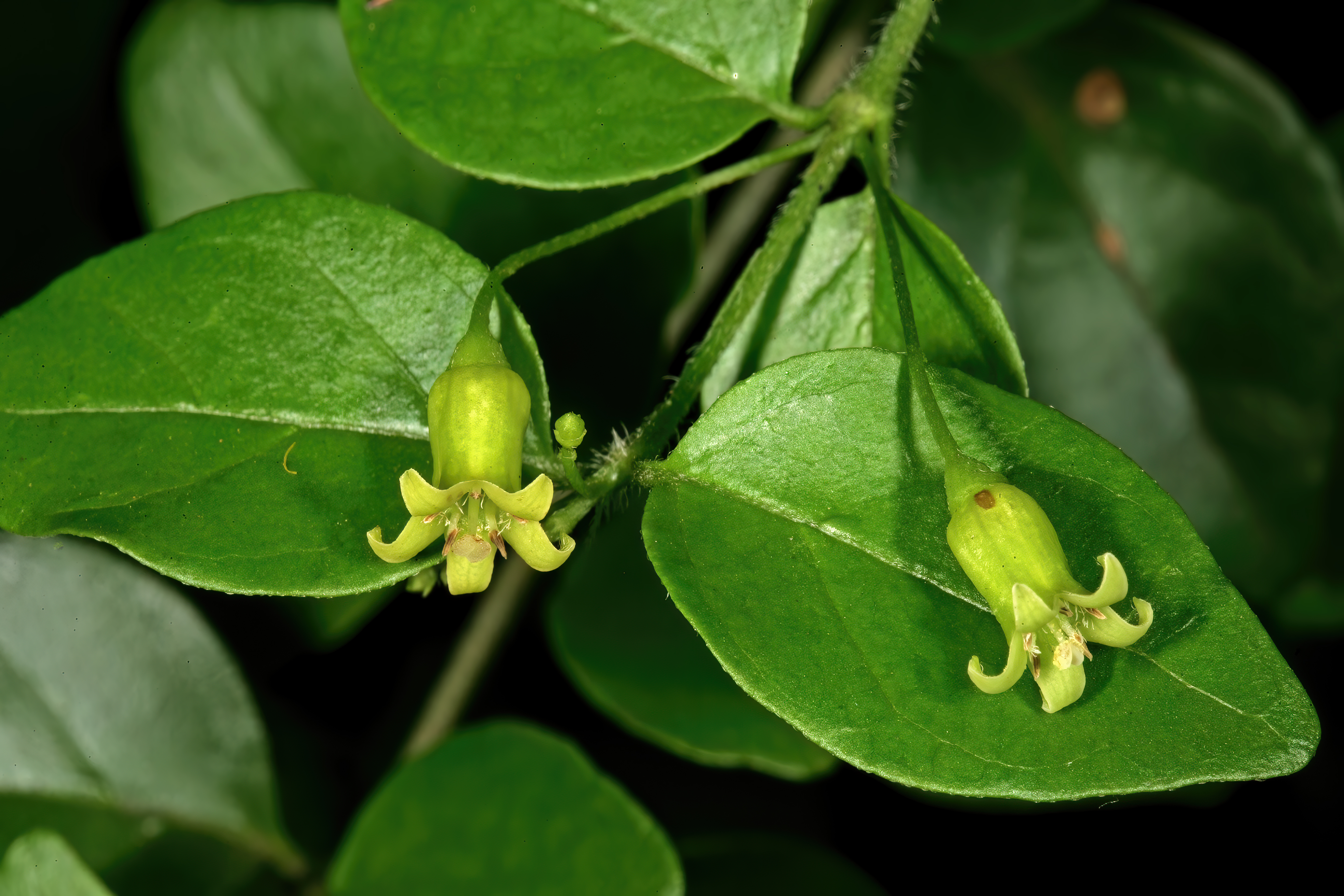
Canthium spp.

Current annual rainfall is approximately 820 millimetres (32 in) at the town Ingwavuma, which is roughly 12 kilometres (7.5 mi) south of Border Cave. The cave resides in a biodiversity hotspot called the Maputoland Center of Endemism, which has abundant riverine and lowveld vegetation. The specific vegetation zones that occur near Border Cave include Lebombo Summit Sourveld, and Northern and Southern Lebombo Bushveld. Vegetation surveys indicate that the main plants common to Border Cave include Androstachys johnsonii, Acacia spp., Combretum spp., Olea europaea subsp. africana, Canthium spp., Dichrostachys cinerea, Diospyros dichrophylla, Eretia rigida, Euclea divinorum, Euphorbia tirucalli, Maytenus spp., Eragrostis, Spirostachys africana, Strychnos henningsii and Vitex wilmsii.

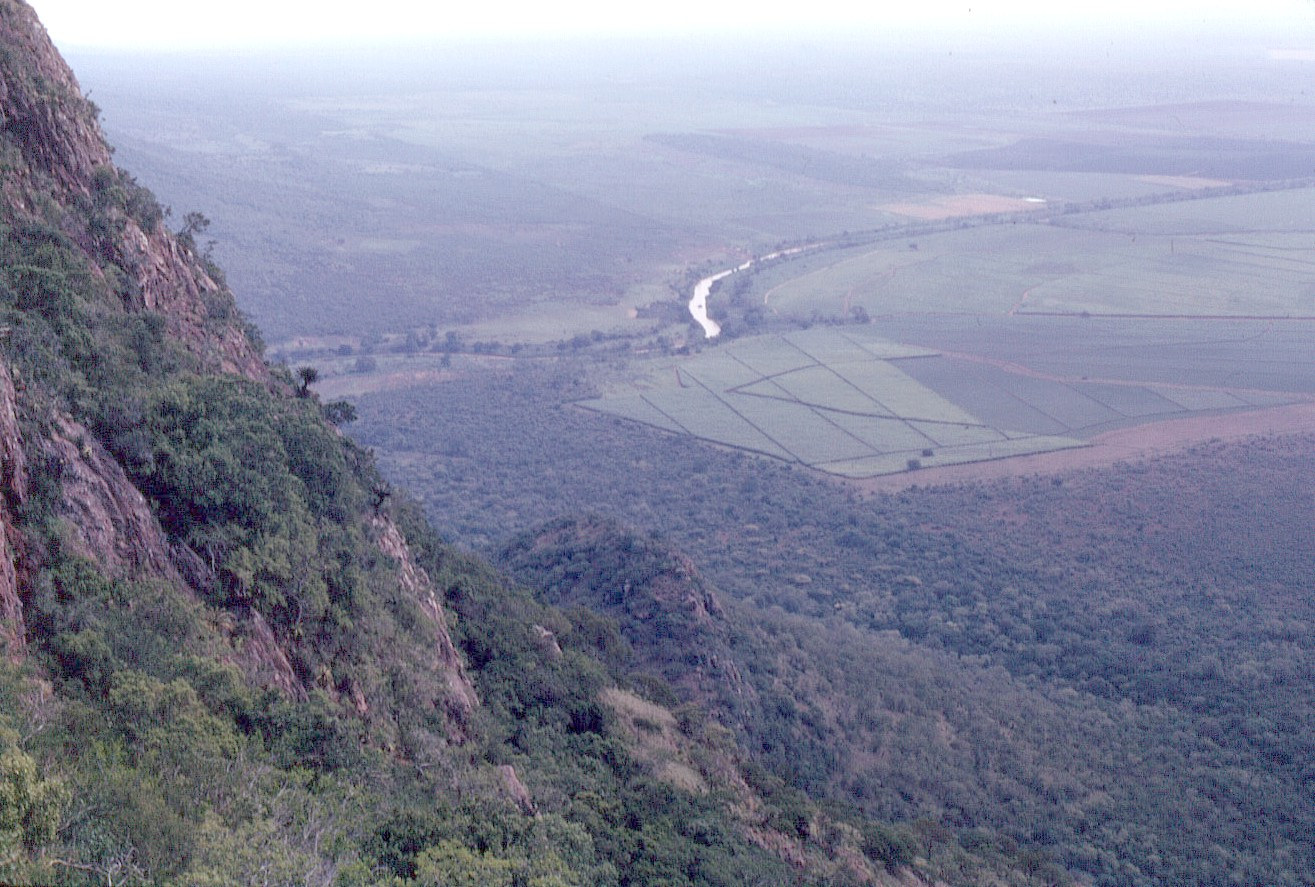
Overview of Ngwavuna River from Border Cave

=== Paleoenvironment ===
Rodent and insectivore remains (primarily from Angoni vlei rat, pygmy mouse, and least dwarf shrew) suggest that Border Cave vegetation communities changed multiple times during the Late Pleistocene. These communities include miombo savanna woodland (heavily wooded environment, ~250,000–100,000 years BP), Zululand Thornveld (predominantly grasses, ~100,000–50,000 years BP), Mopane, and Lowveld/arid Lowveld (savanna woodland type environment, ~50,000–24,000 years BP). Annual rainfall was at least 25–100% higher during the miombo savanna woodland period than today, but less than 10% of rainfall occurred during the winter. The replacement of miombo woodland by Zululand Thornveld would have likely meant a 20% to 30% increase in precipitation, and a change to Lowveld would have meant a 15% decrease in precipitation. In sum, mean annual rainfall would have decreased from 200% of present-day rainfall to 60% of present-day mean annual rainfall from the beginning to end of Border Cave's sequence.

== Excavation history ==
Raymond Dart directed preliminary excavations at Border Cave in 1934. He dug an exploratory trench east–west trench close to Border Cave's entrance. Although Dart found Middle Stone Age artifacts, he did not publish any of his findings.

W.E. Horton dug at Border Cave in 1940, though only for agricultural purposes. Horton excavated for bat guano, and exposed artifacts and human remains in the process. However, he displaced these artifacts and remains from their original context and left his excavated sediment at the site (what some researchers call "Horton's Pit").

Cooke and colleagues re-excavated Horton's sediment during 1941–1942 and recovered the human remains. These remains included a partial adult cranium and other human remains fragments (individuals BC1 and BC2). Cooke and colleagues also discovered a mostly intact infant skeleton (BC3) at the site alongside some Conus shells.

Peter Beaumont excavated the site between 1970 and 1975. Beaumont, Todd and Miller jointly excavated more material in 1987. During these excavations, Beaumont and colleagues excavated two areas in the North and South parts of the cave. They recovered enamel samples from a human mandible (specimen BC5) for electron spin resonance dating. The sample returned a date of 74,000 ± 4,000 years BP. Beaumont analyzed the site's stratigraphy (consisting mostly of alternating Brown Sand and White Ash layers) and material culture (particularly the lithics) to a greater degree of detail than previous researchers. Beaumont suggested that four cultural layers at Border Cave existed, which included MSA 1 (Pietersberg), MSA 2b (Howiesons Poort), MSA 3 (post-Howiesons Poort) and ELSA (Early Later Stone Age).

Lucinda Backwell's team from the University of the Witswatersrand reopened the site in 2015 and are currently excavating more deposits. These current excavations have focused on redefining the excavation grid and determining precise proveniences of artifacts larger than 2 cm using a total station. The team is also trying to update faunal and lithic analyses of Border Cave's newly excavated material.

=== Site dating ===
Researchers have used electron spin resonance and radiocarbon dating to date Border Cave's oldest deposits to 227,000 ± 11,000 years BP and the youngest deposits to 41,100–24,000 years BP. Luminescence dates extend the oldest age of the site to ~250,000 years BP, though the rest of these luminescence dates roughly align with the electron spin resonance and radiocarbon dates.

== Paleoanthropological findings ==
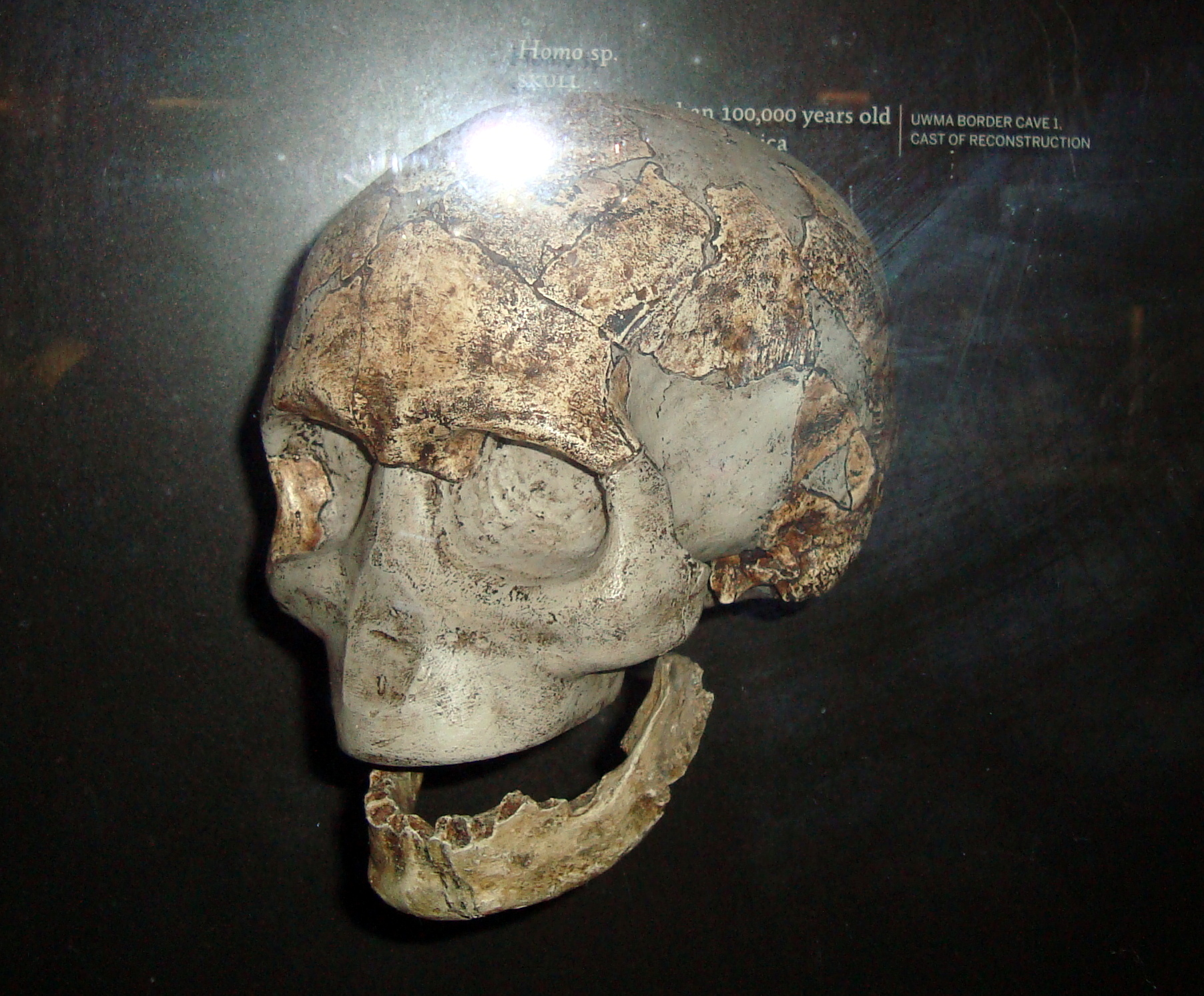
Border cave Homo sapiens skull

Researchers have documented anatomically modern human remains from nine different individuals at Border Cave (BC1, BC2, BC3, BC4, BC5, BC6, BC7, BC8a, and BC8b), though researchers have lost the remains from four of those individuals (BC 6, BC 7, BC8a, and BC8b). Researchers have used electron spin resonance (ESR) to directly date some of these remains.

BC1 is an incomplete cranium that W.E. Horton found during his 1940 excavation. BC1's ages remains uncertain, though ESR returned dates of 77,000 ± 2,000 years BP and 161,000 ± 10,000 to 144,000 ± 11,000 years BP. Amelie Beaudet and colleagues' analysis of BC1 states that the cranial vault is similar in shape to anatomically modern humans, but also shares some traits in the bony labyrinth with fossil hominins such as Homo erectus (which are also found in modern humans but not in Neanderthals).

BC2 is a partial mandible from W.E. Horton's excavation. The provenance and date for this individual remain unknown.

BC3 is a nearly complete infant skeleton that Cooke and colleagues found in 1941. Cooke and colleagues found perforated Conus bairstowi shells with the infant, which likely came from the eastern Cape coast. Carbon-14 dating of the shell returned an age of ~ 33,570 ± 120 years BP. Some suggest that the infant burial represents one of the earliest southern African examples of burial ornamentation.

BC4 is an Iron Age skeleton with a missing skull. Researchers dated BC4 to 340 ± 45 years BP and 480 ± 45 years BP using radiocarbon dating.

BC5 is a nearly complete mandible that researchers dated to 74,000 ± 5,000 years BP with ESR.

Researchers lost BC6 (humerus), BC7 (proximal ulna) and BC8a and BC8b (two metatarsals), and lack adequate provenance information to accurately date these remains.

== Archaeological findings ==
=== Middle Stone Age (MSA) ===
==== Botanical remains ====
Border Cave preserves botanical remains dating back to ~227,000 years BP, which are older than those of previous findings in southern Africa (i.e. grass bedding from Sibudu Cave dating to 77,000 years BP). The oldest plant remains are grass beds from layers dating to 227,000-179,000 years BP. Panicoideae grasses, occasional sedges and dicotyledenous leaves make up the bedding. The grass beds are located near the rear of the cave. The burnt charcoal within the grass bedding and alternating stratigraphic layers of brown sand and white ash represent multiple burning events over time. Burn marks on Border Cave's grass bedding tend to only occur near the edges, rather than throughout the beds, which may indicate that these edges may have accidentally been burned. In total, there are 48 bedding layers. There are also Hypoxis rhizomes within Border Cave's hearths, which has led some to suggest that Border Cave's inhabitants cooked plants for food. Regular burning occurred by 170,000 years BP according to the phytolith record. Other phytolith remains include Chloridoideae and Pooideae grasses.

==== Lithics ====
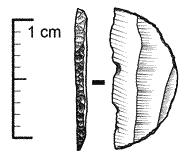
Backed stone tool (one edge blunted to ~90 degrees)

Raymond Dart uncovered "Middle Stone Age" lithics in his preliminary excavations of Border Cave, though he did not formally analyze them. Peter Beaumont performed one of the first comprehensive lithic analyses of Border Cave's material, and he recognized two distinct stone tool industries for Border Cave's MSA layers: Howiesons Poort (HP) (from layers dating 81–65 kya) and MSA 3/post-Howiesons Poort (post-HP) (from layers dating 64–44 kya). Beaumont found many punched blades, backed pieces and triangular retouched pieces in the HP layers. The MSA 3/post-HP layers had very few backed pieces, and instead had more prepared cores.

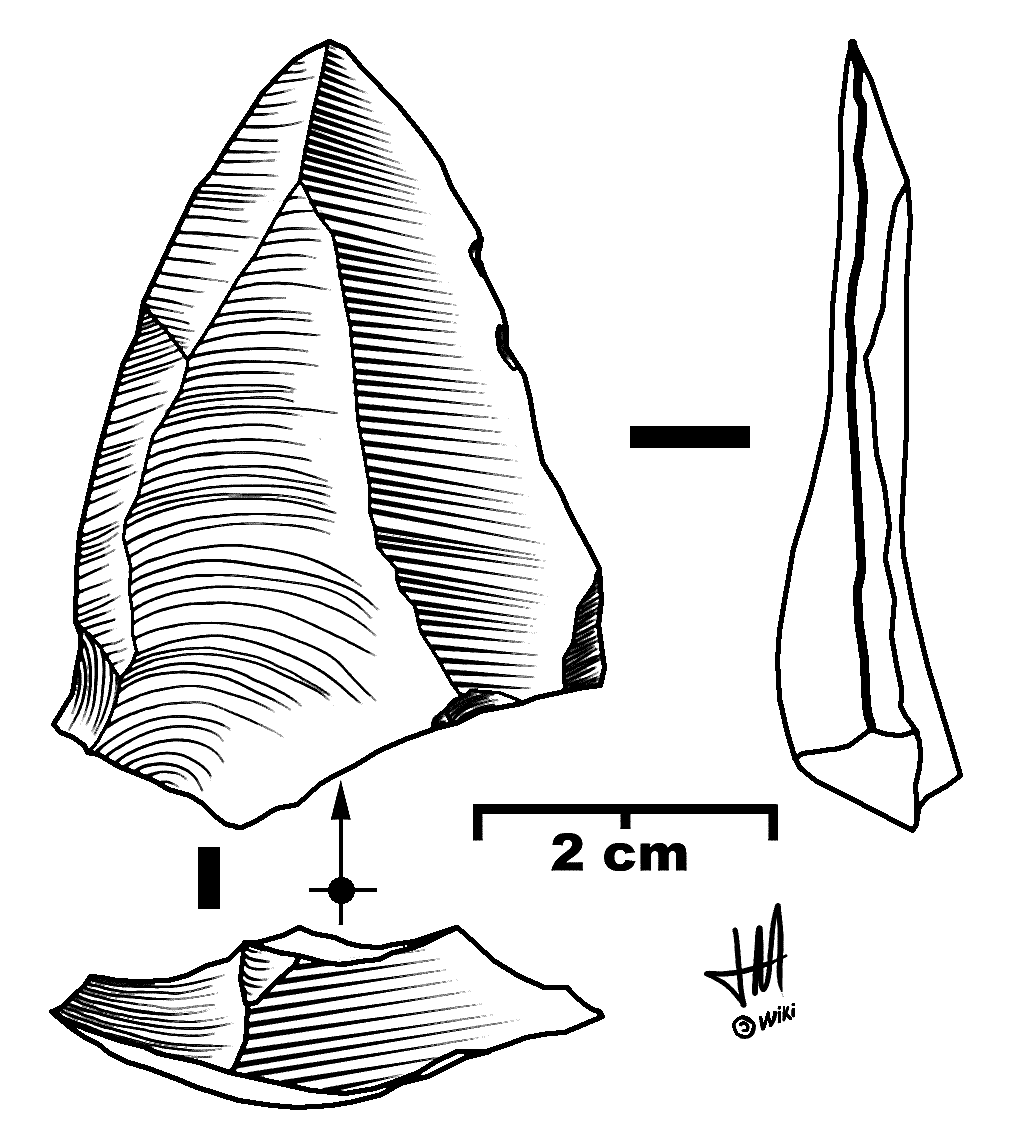
Unretouched Levallois point

Paloma de la Peña and colleagues later analyzed lithics from the same layers at Border Cave. A majority of these lithic raw materials were rhyolite or basalt, though quartz, chalcedony, agate and chert also occur within this assemblage. Backed pieces occur in the HP layers, but are absent in the MSA 3/post-HP layers. Other retouched tools such as notched pieces, and denticulates occur in the MSA 3/post-HP layers, though in lesser quantities.

The MSA 3/post-HP layers contain mostly unretouched triangular points. Lithic analysis suggests that hunter-gatherers used both Levallois and discoidal reduction techniques to produce these points. These points' morphologies (particularly the discoidal ones) are very different from one another, which has led some to believe that there was a lack of planning in lithic reduction strategies. Lucy Timbrell and colleagues hypothesize that the lack of retouch of the MSA 3/post-HP points may be due to low site occupation intensity, raw material abundance, point hafting requirements, or the sufficiency of unretouched tools in accomplishing tasks. This is in contrast with assemblages from other sites (i.e. Sibudu Cave), which preserve a greater abundance of retouch debris. Small platform bladelet cores and bipolar cores and flakes also occur in the MSA 3/post-HP layers.

==== Fauna ====
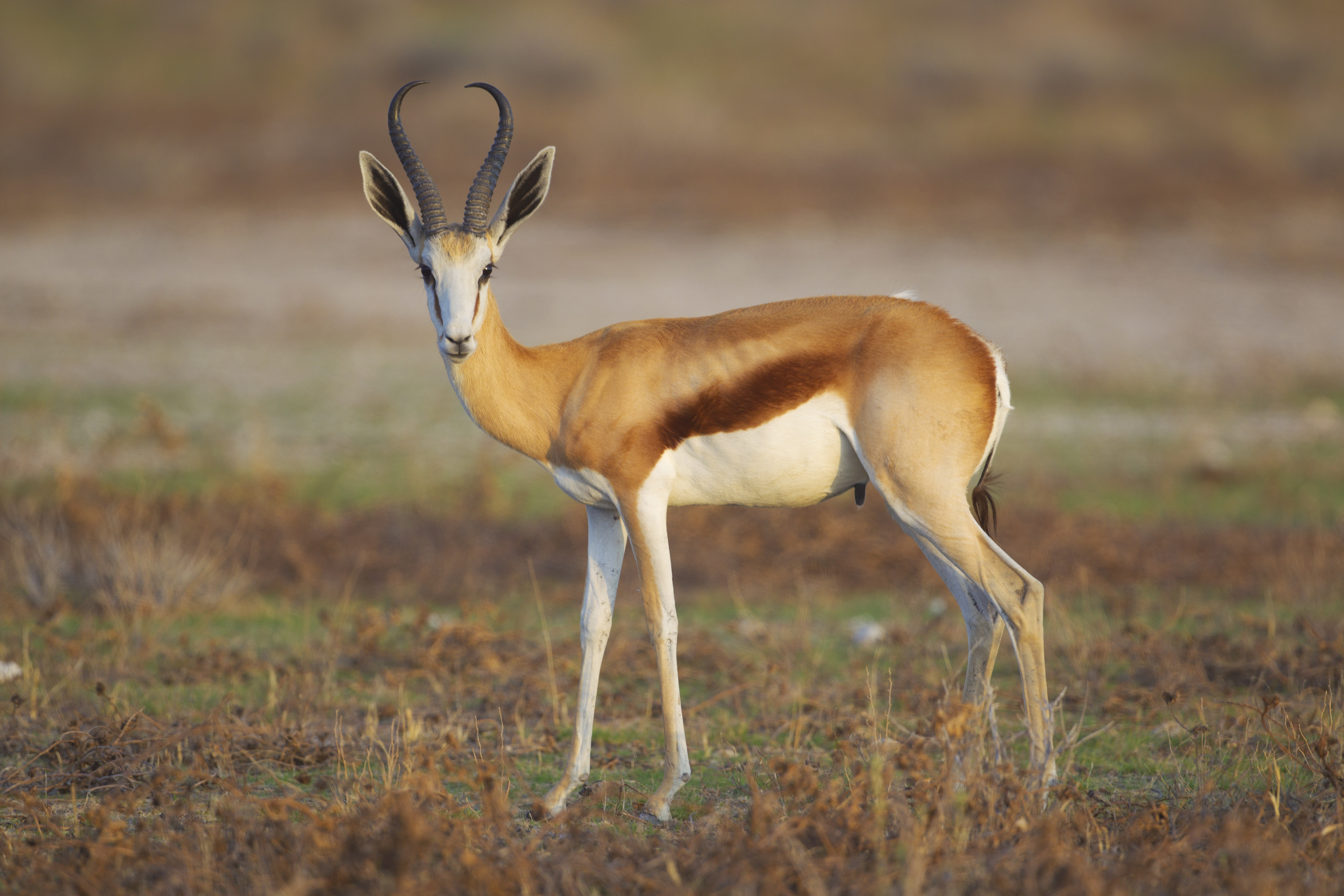
springbok

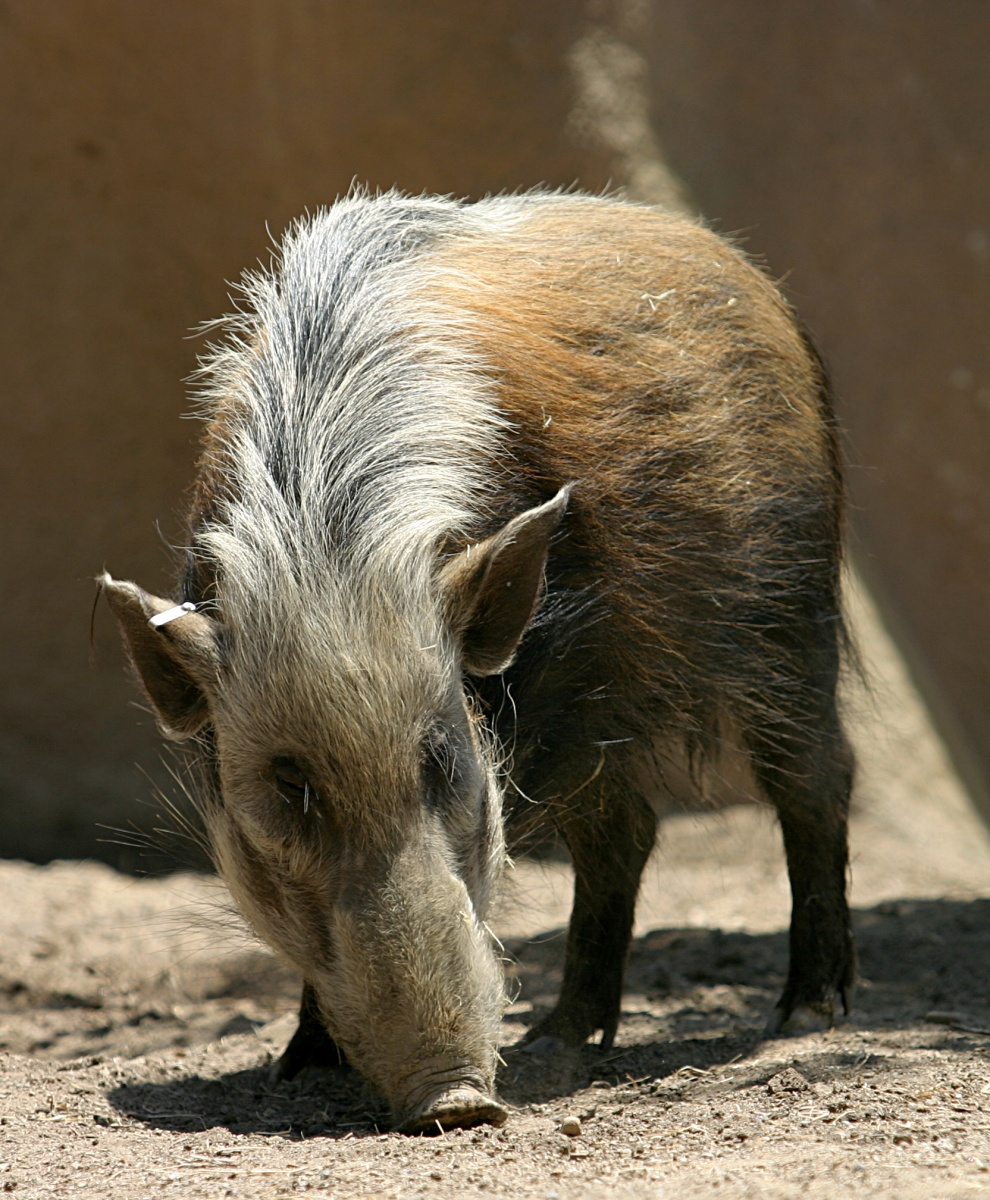
bushpig

Border Cave's Middle Stone Age fauna were primarily mammals, though there are a few bird types represented in the assemblage. The most abundant mammals were hares and small-large bovids (i.e. grysbok, oribi, klipspringer, mountain reedbuck, impala, bushbuck, springbok, hartebeest, wildebeest). Other animals such as bushpig, warthog, chacma baboons, vervet monkeys, honey badgers, and Burchell's zebra also occur in the assemblage. At least three currently extinct species are also present in the faunal assemblage (one of which is Bond's springbok). Even more recently excavated faunal material from the MSA layers is heavily fragmented, likely due to taphonomic damage. Faunal analysis suggests that hunter-gatherers transported the whole small animal carcasses back to the site, but only parts of larger animals back. Border Cave's faunal remains also do not show evidence of carnivore tooth marks. Some researchers suggest that this evidence is enough to claim that humans were the main individuals who brought these materials back to the site.

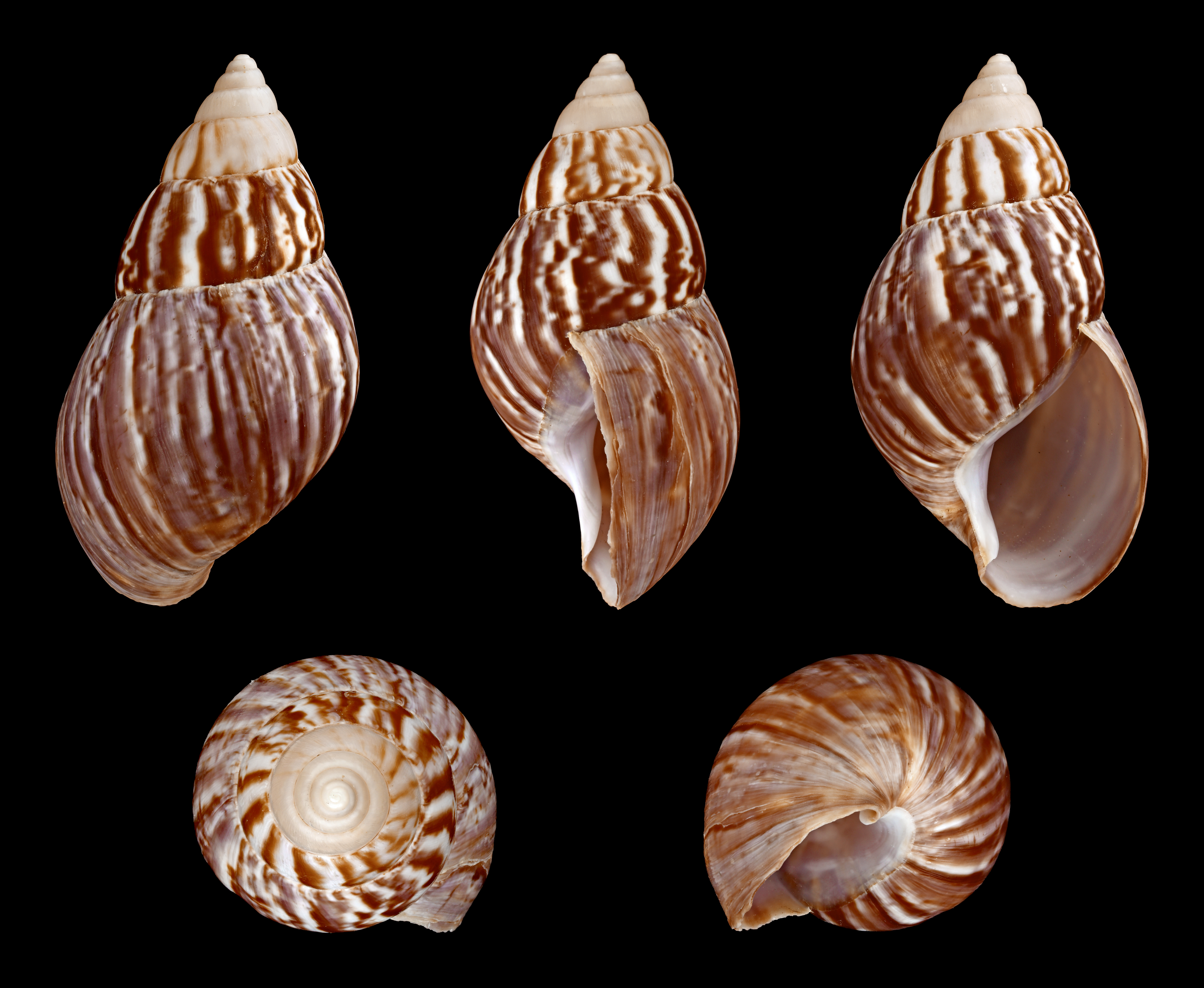
land snail shell

From 170 to 60 kya, beige, brown and grey land snail shell fragments also appear in the Middle Stone Age sequence (i.e. Metachatina kraussi – brown lipped agate snail). Experiments show that land snail shell color changes in response to heat application, and have led researchers to believe that Border Cave occupants cooked and ate land snails. The presence of heated shell fragments and absence of any modifications on the shells have led researchers to suggest that Border Cave inhabitants primarily cooked land snails and did not use them for tool manufacture.

=== Early Later Stone Age (ELSA) ===
==== Fauna and organic tools ====
Border Cave experienced generally very little change in faunal composition from the MSA to the LSA. However, Border Cave occupants made organic artifacts dating to 44,000–42,000 years BP during the ELSA. These artifacts include notched bones, wooden digging sticks, and pointed bones (some of which have ochre) made from warthog, bushpig and baboon. The functions of these tools remain speculative. Francesco d'Errico and colleagues in particular interpret pointed bone tools to be awls and bone points, and suggest that an incised baboon fibula from the site is a number-keeping device. One of the notched sticks contains poison residues composed of ricinoleic and ricinelaidic acids, and d'Errico and colleagues assume this item to be a poison applicator.

==== Lithics and groundstone ====
Border Cave's lithic assemblage features comparatively more bipolar knapped pieces and fewer blades than the MSA (precisely the MSA 3/Post-HP layers). Raw material changes also occurred during the ELSA. In particular, chalcedony, milky quartz and crystal quartz become more prominent in the assemblage, and rhyolite becomes less so. Other lithics include small, unretouched tools, some of which have traces of resin (possibly from Podocarpaceae plants). Bored stones also occur at the site, which some presume to have been digging stick weights.

==== Ostrich eggshell and marine shell ====
Ostrich eggshell and marine beads, which some suggest as evidence of ornamentation amongst Later Stone Age hunter-gatherer groups, occur in Border Cave's ELSA sequence. Marine beads were of Nassarius kraussianus, Conus ebraeus, and Conus bairstowi, the last of which is endemic to the Eastern Cape coast. The Conus shells were in close association with an infant burial (BC3), which have led to speculation that these shells were ornaments.

== Debates surrounding the site ==
=== Debates on human remains ===
Border Cave is one of the only southern African archaeological sites (another is Klasies River Caves) that contains human remains dating to the MSA. A particular debate surrounding these remains relates to whether they belong to anatomically modern Homo sapiens or not. This debate has implications for the timing of modern Homo sapiens' evolution in southern Africa. A large part of the uncertainty stems from the fact that the provenance of some of the human remains is still unknown. The dating of Border Cave's human remains has played a role in this debate.

Researchers originally dated BC3 and BC 5 to the MSA, but others have questioned the age of these remains due to variance in Infrared Splitting Factors and nitrogen levels in Border Cave's animal and human remains. However, the most recent dating efforts date BC3 to ~ 33,570 ± 120 years BP and BC5 to 74,000 ± 5,000 years BP. Comparative analyses of Border Cave's human remains and those of other modern humans have also contributed to the debate on whether Border Cave's remains belong to anatomically modern Homo sapiens.

Herta De Villiers' analysis of BC3 (infant skeleton) body dimensions suggests that the human remains represent a precursor to modern African humans. Philip Rightmire on the other hand performed a discriminant analysis on BC1 (adult cranium), which revealed that Border Cave's human remains were similar to modern-day African populations. Researchers have criticized Rightmire for improperly using discriminant analysis and for considering BC1's relation only to African populations and not others. Other studies have reassessed BC1's similarities and differences with African and non-African populations, and suggest that BC1 is dissimilar from modern African humans as well as from modern non-African groups. The most recent analysis of Border Cave's human remains suggests that BC1 possesses a similar cranial vault morphology to anatomically modern humans, and has bony labyrinth features that are similar to other hominins (i.e. Homo erectus), as well as to modern humans, but unlike those of Neanderthals.

In 2016, a San delegation approached the Evolutionary Studies Institute at the University of the Witwatersrand where the remains are deposited, expressing their wish to pay tribute to BC3 in a traditional San ceremony at Border Cave. The delegates considered themselves to be the descendants of the original Border Cave population which had been displaced during the Mfecane. An application to obtain support from the government failed; as of November 2024, there is no further information about the progress of the claim.

=== Applicability of ethnographic analogy to the archaeological record ===
One anthropological question concerns whether ethnographic models are appropriate for making inferences about the archaeological record. In particular, there has been disagreement on whether analyzing modern hunter-gatherer behavior is appropriate for understanding prehistoric hunter-gatherer behavior. One particular example of this is the Kalahari Debate, in which researchers disagreed whether present-day Kalahari San hunter-gatherers have lifeways reminiscent of prehistoric hunter-gatherers or not. Richard Borshay Lee and Irven DeVore believed that San hunter-gatherers have remained in isolation from non-hunter-gatherer groups (and thus have lifeways reminiscent of prehistoric hunter-gatherers), while Edwin Wilmsen and James Denbow suggested that sustained contact with pastoralists and other groups refute the view that San populations have a pure hunter-gatherer way of life. The viewpoints of the Kalahari Debate have shaped the ways that researchers conduct archaeological research and interpret site findings (i.e. finding material evidence for pastoralist interactions with hunter-gatherers). These views have also influenced archaeological and ethnographic interpretations. One instance of this concerns researchers' interpretations of Border Cave's ELSA artifacts.

A point of contention amongst archaeologists is whether Border Cave's organic ELSA artifacts represent the evolution of a San hunter-gatherer culture in southern Africa during the Pleistocene. Francesco d'Errico and colleagues propose that the similarities between Border Cave's ELSA organic tools and contemporary San tools indicate the evolution of a Pleistocene San adaptation ~44,000–42,000 years BP. In particular, they propose that Border Cave's bone points, digging sticks, bone awls, poison residues, and shell beads are roughly indistinguishable from those of modern San hunter-gatherers, and suggest that Border Cave inhabitants may have used these tools in the same ways as modern San populations.

However, Pargeter and colleagues dispute these claims on the basis that these tools are not uniquely 'San', and occur in the toolkits of other hunter-gatherers as well (i.e. the Mbuti, Inuit, Chumash). Secondarily, Pargeter and colleagues suggest that the function of the Border Cave tools is speculative (i.e. people may have used pointed bones as awls, needles, or projectile points), and that Border Cave's occupants may not have used tools in similar ways to modern San hunter-gatherers. Pargeter and colleagues also suggest that simply referring to archaeological populations as 'San' oversimplifies the variation between hunter-gatherer populations. As such, Pargeter and colleagues challenge Francesco d'Errico and colleagues for using modern San hunter-gatherers as direct ethnographic analogs to reconstruct the behaviors of Border Cave hunter-gatherers.

=== Middle to Later Stone Age (MSA-LSA) transition ===
A prominent point of discussion in the African prehistoric record concerns the timing of the MSA-LSA transition. Researchers are interested in the behavioral changes that occur from the MSA-LSA and typically use technological changes to determine the date of the transition. MSA sites preserve tools such as prepared cores, retouched and unretouched points, and retouched tools such as denticulates and scrapers. LSA sites, on the other hand, primarily tend to contain bipolar bladelet technologies. Researchers have tracked these technological shifts over time to determine when the MSA/LSA transition occurred. The MSA/LSA transition occurred at different times throughout Africa ~30,000–60,000 years BP.

There is debate regarding when the MSA/LSA transition first occurred in southern Africa. Border Cave's technological transition occurs ~44,000–42,000 years BP, which is to date one of the oldest instances of the MSA/LSA transition in southern Africa. Paola Villa and colleagues suggest that Border Cave's shift from post-Howiesons Poort technology (blades and retouched points) to bipolar flakes and bladelets indicate the occurrence of the MSA-LSA transition. This has led Paola Villa and colleagues to believe that Border Cave shows the earliest evidence for the MSA-LSA transition in southern Africa. Researchers have questioned whether technological changes began at Border Cave and then later spread to other archaeological sites. Since LSA technology does not occur prior to ~27,000 years BP in localities surrounding Border Cave (i.e. Sibebe in Eswatini, Niassa in Mozambique), some dispute the claim that Border Cave represents a true origin locality for the MSA/LSA transition, and instead propose that shows an independent event of cultural and behavioral change. The debate as to whether Border Cave is the origin point for the MSA-LSA transition still remains unresolved.
