= William Lloyd (archdeacon of Durban) =

British priest (1802–1881)

William Henry Cynric Lloyd (13 January 1802 – 3 January 1881) was a Welsh Anglican clergyman, Archdeacon of Durban from 1869.

== Life ==
He was the son of Bell Lloyd, brother to Edward Lloyd, 1st Baron Mostyn, and Anne Anson (see George Anson (1731–1789)), sister of Thomas Anson, 1st Viscount Anson and niece of Edward Venables-Vernon-Harcourt, Archbishop of York. He was brought up at the Anson seat, Shugborough Hall and at Lord Mostyn's castle in Flintshire, Wales.

Lloyd entered Jesus College, Oxford, with a scholarship in 1819 (which he held until 1829), obtaining his B.A. degree in 1822 and a M.A. degree in 1825. He became chaplain to his cousin Thomas Anson, 1st Earl of Lichfield and was also rector of Norbury, Staffordshire.

Accompanied by his family, Lloyd arrived in Durban, South Africa in 1849 as the first colonial chaplain appointed by the Secretary of State for War and the Colonies, Henry Grey, 3rd Earl Grey. With the arrival of John William Colenso, the first bishop of Natal in 1854 Lloyd was involved in the 'Colenso Controversy'.

Lloyd was rector of St. Paul's Church, Durban. Subsequently, from 1869 for the rest of his life, he was Archdeacon of Durban. His cousin Major-General Banastyre Pryce Lloyd joined him in Durban, that year. He was military chaplain at the Fort in Durban during the Anglo-Zulu War of 1879.

== Family ==
Lloyd married firstly Lucy Jeffreys (died 1843) the daughter of the Rev. John Jeffreys, and secondly married Ellen Norman (died 1903), daughter of the Revd Henry Norman. His children remained in Natal and gained various distinctions;

- Jemima Charlotte Lloyd (1837–1909) married philologist and librarian Wilhelm Bleek.
- Lucy Lloyd (1834–1914) renowned traveller and African linguist.
- William Llewelyn Lloyd married Baroness Maria von Gross-Zauche, daughter of the German consul to Namibia.
- Alfred Norman Mostyn Lloyd (1868–1941), registrar of deeds, Pietermaritzburg, and father of Anson Lloyd (b. 1914), chairman of the board of governors of Michaelhouse, a school the men of the family traditionally have attended.
