= Marshal Llewelyn Clarke =

Royal Navy Admiral (1887-1959)

Admiral Sir Marshal Llewelyn Clarke, KBE, CB, DSC (9 May 1887 – 8 April 1959) was a Royal Navy officer.

The second child and elder son of the artillery officer and colonial administrator Sir Marshal James Clarke, Marshal Llewelyn Clarke was born in Basutoland, where his father was serving as its first Resident Commissioner.

He was Admiral-superintendent, Portsmouth, from 1940 to 1945.
