= Old Gaol Building (Ingwavuma) =

The Old Gaol Building is a historic wood and iron building dating from the 1900s in Ingwavuma, KwaZulu-Natal Province, South Africa. The building is located near the welfare buildings. In 2004, the building was restored as part of a project run by Nansindlela School. H.C. Lugg, Chief Native Commissioner of Natal in the 1930s, described the Old Gaol as it was in 1920 in his book A Natal Family Looks Back as follows:

"The gaol, like the court house, was also constructed of wood and iron. One day its walls were blown down, but soon re-erected by the convicts. Any attempt by a prisoner to escape, was followed by a hue and cry in which the convicts took part, never failing to get their man."
