= Banastyre Pryce Lloyd =

- Born: 1824
- Died: 21 November 1882 (aged 57–58)
- Spouse: Anna Grimes Stacey
- Military career
- Allegiance: United Kingdom
- Branch: East India Company
- Rank: Major-general

Major-General Banastyre Pryce Lloyd (1824 – 21 November 1882) was a British officer, linguist and civil servant.

== Biography ==
Lloyd was the son of Llewelyn Lloyd, younger brother to Edward Lloyd, 1st Baron Mostyn, and of Jane Falkner. He was a cousin of William H. C. Lloyd, Archdeacon of Durban.

He received a commission in the East India Company and participated in several campaigns including the Gwalior Campaign. In 1846 he was civil commissioner of an Indian district and was there at the time of the Indian Mutiny. After being made a lieutenant-colonel he left India for Natal, South Africa to escape the unhealthy climate.

Lloyd's knowledge of Hindustani made him invaluable to the colonial government who were responsible for a large minority of Indian immigrants. By 1872 he was Protector of Indian Immigrants under Law. In 1874 he was acting Colonial Secretary of Natal and was given a seat on the Natal Legislative Council. He was promoted to the rank of major-general in 1875.

=== Marriage and children ===
He married Anna Grimes Stacey.

== Sources ==
- Burke's Peerage Baronetage & Knightage, 107th edition (ISBN 0971196621)
- Who's Who: South Africa
