= Grootvlei Prison =

- Location within Free State (South African province) Location within South Africa
- Coordinates: 29.228°S 26.296°E
- Country: South Africa
- Province: Free State
- Municipality: Mangaung
- Main Place: Bloemfontein

Government

Area
  - Total: 3.04 km^{2} (1.17 sq mi)

Population (2011)
  - Total: 5,586
  - Density: 1,840/km^{2} (4,760/sq mi)

Racial makeup (2011)
  - Black African: 85%
  - Coloured: 11%
  - White: 4%

First languages (2011)
  - Sotho: 47.3%
  - Afrikaans: 27.2%
  - Xhosa: 12.5%
  - Tswana: 5.0%
  - Other: 8.0%
- Time zone: UTC+2 (SAST)
- PO box: 9323
- Area code: 051

Grootvlei Prison is situated just southwest of the city of Bloemfontein in South Africa.
