= Natal (province) =

Province of South Africa, 1910 to 1994

Coordinates: 29°S 30°E

Province of Natal Natalprovinsie (Afrikaans)
- Province of South Africa
- 1910–1994
- Coat of arms

- Natal as it was by 1994
- Capital: Pietermaritzburg
- Demonym: Natalian
- Area
- Population
  - 1991: 2,430,753
- Legislature: Natal Provincial Council
- History
  - Established: 31 May 1910
  - Disestablished: 27 April 1994
Preceded by	Succeeded by
Colony of Natal	KwaZulu-Natal

The Province of Natal (Afrikaans: Natalprovinsie), commonly called Natal, was a province of South Africa from May 1910 until May 1994. Its capital was Pietermaritzburg. During this period rural areas inhabited by the black African population of Natal were organised into the Bantustan of KwaZulu, which was progressively separated from the province, becoming partially autonomous in 1981. For the significant population of Indian South Africans residing in Natal, the third-largest city of Durban was organised for them. Of the white population, the majority were English-speaking people of British descent, causing Natal to become the only province to vote "No" to the creation of a republic in the referendum of 1960, due to very strong monarchist, pro-British Commonwealth, and anti-secessionist sentiment. In the latter part of the 1980s, Natal was in a state of violence between the Inkatha Freedom Party and the African National Congress, with violence subsiding soon after the first non-racial election in 1994.

In 1994, the KwaZulu Bantustan was reincorporated into the territory of Natal and the province was redesignated as KwaZulu-Natal.

== Districts in 1991 ==
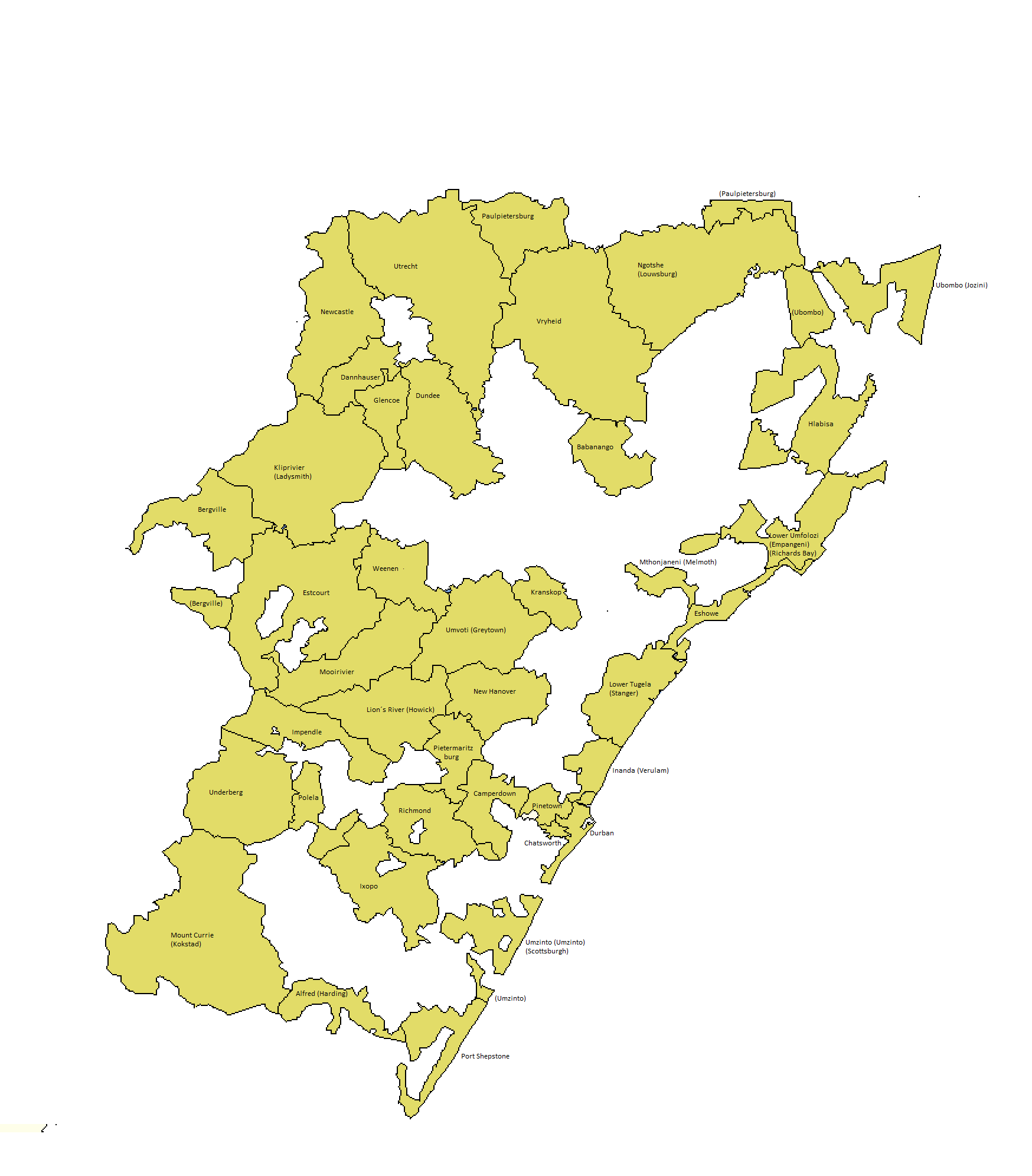

Districts of the province and population at the time of the 1991 census.

District	Population
Mount Currie (main town Kokstad)	41,564
Alfred (main town Harding)	8,794
Port Shepstone	67,239
Umzinto	46,919
Ixopo	22,626
Polela	4,364
Underberg	9,584
Impendle	2,815
Richmond	23,476
Camperdown	36,315
Pietermaritzburg	228,549
Lions River	43,060
New Hanover	38,207
Mooirivier	25,061
Estcourt	49,493
Weenen	12,485
Bergville	22,552
Umvoti (main town Greytown)	41,160
Kranskop	7,565
Durban	473,826
Inanda (main town Verulam)	299,379
Pinetown	184,216
Chatsworth	179,957
Kliprivier	64,782
Glencoe	17,265
Dundee	31,613
Dannhauser	14,154
Newcastle	53,584
Utrecht	27,798
Paulpietersburg	21,072
Vryheid	85,518
Ngotshe	26,382
Lower Tugela (main town Stanger)	96,702
Mtunzini	18,455
Eshowe	13,355
Mtonjaneni (main town Melmoth)	10,577
Babanango	3,069
Lower Umfolozi (main town Empangeni)	56,082
Hlabisa	18,211
Ubombo (main town Jozini)	2,929

== Politics ==
The province was a strong hold of the United party.

Province	National	United/New Republic/Progressive/Democratic	Labour	Other	Total
1943 South African general election	0	6	2	8	15
1948 South African general election	1	11	2	2	
1953 South African general election	2	11	2	0	15
1958 South African general election	2	14	0	0	16
1961 South African general election	2	14	0	0	16
1966 South African general election	5	13	0	0	18
1974 South African general election	5	15	0	0	20
1981 South African general election	7	13	0	0	20
1989 South African general election	10	10	0	0	20
align=left					

== See also ==
- Coat of arms of Natal
- Mtetwa Empire (c. 1750–1817)
- Zululand (1816–1897)
- Natalia Republic (1839–1843)
- Colony of Natal (1843–1910)
- KwaZulu-Natal (1994–)
