= Ngwavuma River =

Ngwavuma River Inguavuma, Ingwavuma or Nggwavuma
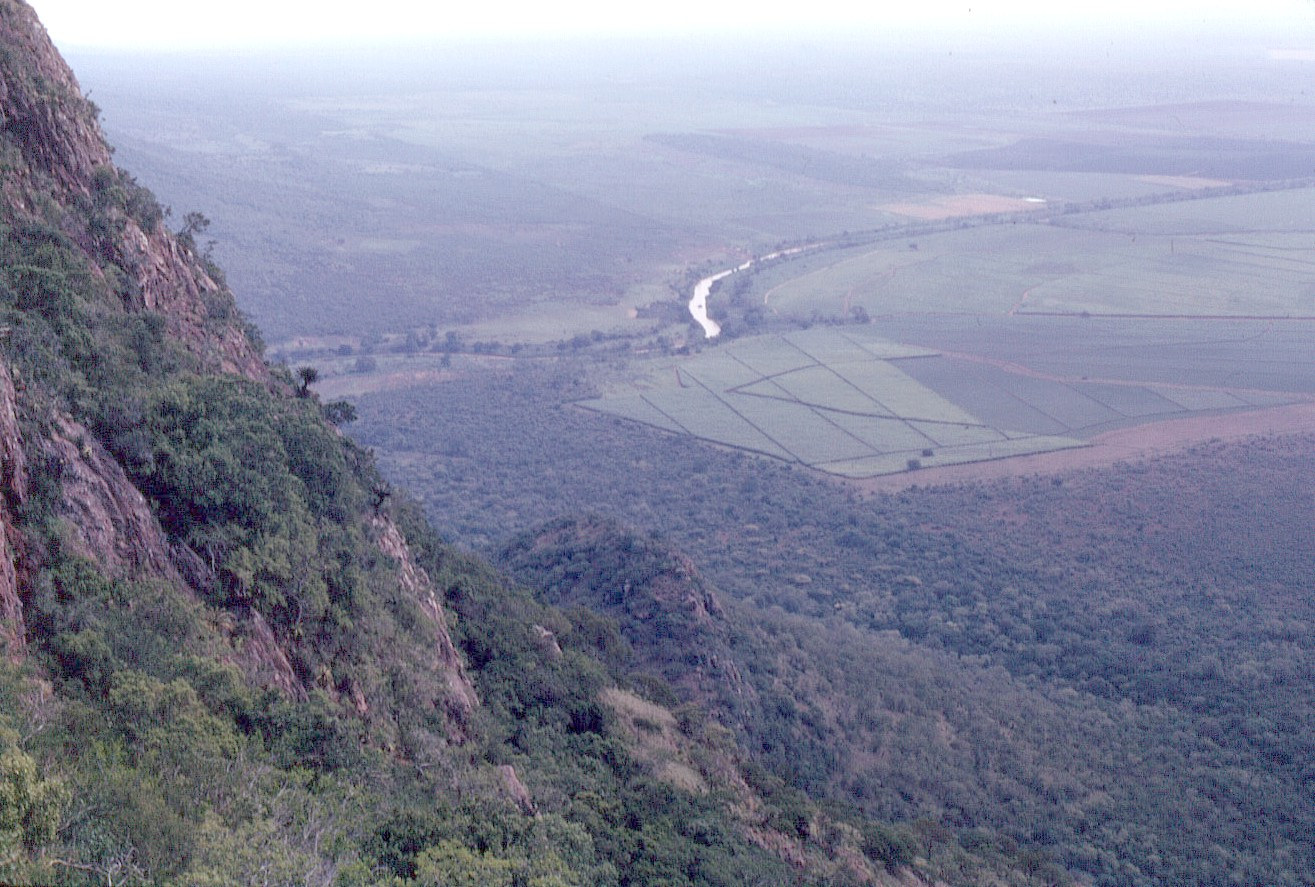
- View from Border Cave over Ingwavuma River

- Location of the Ngwavuma River mouth
- Etymology: From the Zulu name for Elaeodendron transvaalense, a tree whose bark is a fever remedy; possibly also 'the growling one' referring to the sound the river makes when passing through a ravine.

Location
- Country: Eswatini, South Africa

Physical characteristics
- Source
  - location: SW Eswatini
- Mouth: Phongolo River
  - location: Kwazulu-Natal, South Africa
  - coordinates: 26°57′42″S 32°17′39″E
  - elevation: 34 m (112 ft)

The Ngwavuma is a river in Eswatini and KwaZulu-Natal Province in southern Africa. It is also known as the Inguavuma, Ingwavuma, Ingwovuma, and Nggwavuma, and is one of the five major rivers in Eswatini. It arises in southwestern Eswatini and flows eastward. It is a tributary of the Pongola River.

The principal towns in Eswatini along the Ngwavuma are Nhlangano and Nsoko.
