= Jozini Local Municipality =

Coordinates: 27°25′45″S 32°04′00″E

Jozini
- Local municipality
- Seal

- Location in KwaZulu-Natal
- Country: South Africa
- Province: KwaZulu-Natal
- District: uMkhanyakude
- Seat: Jozini
- Wards: 25

Government
  - Type: Municipal council

Area
  - Total: 3,442 km^{2} (1,329 sq mi)

Population (2011)
  - Total: 186,502
  - Density: 54.18/km^{2} (140.3/sq mi)

Racial makeup (2011)
  - Black African: 99.2%
  - Coloured: 0.1%
  - Indian/Asian: 0.2%
  - White: 0.3%

First languages (2011)
  - Zulu: 95.1%
  - English: 1.2%
  - Southern Ndebele: 1.1%
  - Other: 2.6%
- Time zone: UTC+2 (SAST)
- Municipal code: KZN272

Jozini Municipality (Zulu: UMasipala wase Jozini) is a local municipality within the Umkhanyakude District Municipality, in the KwaZulu-Natal province of South Africa. Significant portions of the municipality have been neglected in terms of economic development. There is a great disparity between the level of service and infrastructure provision between settlement nodes, such as the towns of Mkuze and Jozini, and the surrounding rural areas. Most of the rural area is associated with a lack of development, poverty and poor service provision.

== Main places ==
The 2001 census divided the municipality into the following main places:

Place	Code	Area (km^{2})	Population
Ingwavuma	53301	1.72	1,089
Jozini	53312	0.45	543
Manukuza/Jobe	53303	280.65	18,277
Mathenjwa	53304	435.13	26,332
Mkuze	53305	1.04	1,834
Mngomezulu	53306	277.82	18,676
Myeni/Ngwenya	53307	138.34	10,146
Myeni/Ntsinde	53308	172.91	16,524
Ndumu Game Reserve	53309	110.43	72
Nyawo	53310	909.85	68,148
Sqakatha	53311	238.22	19,818
Remainder of the municipality	53302	523.02	2,628

== Politics ==
The municipal council consists of 49 members elected by mixed-member proportional representation. Twenty-five councillors are elected by first-past-the-post voting in twenty-five wards, while the remaining twenty-four are chosen from party lists so that the total number of party representatives is proportional to the number of votes received.

In the election of 4 November 2026 no party obtained a majority. The Inkatha Freedom Party (IFP) received the most seats with eighteen.

The following table shows the results of the election.

Party	Ward			List			Total seats
Party	Votes	%	Seats	Votes	%	Seats	Total seats
Inkatha Freedom Party	24,281	34.88	8	24,650	35.62	10	18
uMkhonto weSizwe Party	19,999	28.73	11	20,349	29.41	4	15
African National Congress	18,334	26.34	6	18,088	26.14	7	13
Jozini Congress	3,266	4.69	0	3,110	4.49	2	2
Economic Freedom Fighters	1,278	1.84	0	1,176	1.70	1	1
Independent candidates	1,078	1.55	0				0
15 other parties	1,376	1.98	0	1,825	2.64	0	0
Total	69,612	100.00	25	69,198	100.00	24	49
Valid votes	69,612	98.82		69,198	98.70		
Invalid/blank votes	833	1.18		911	1.30		
Total votes	70,445	100.00		70,109	100.00		
Registered voters/turnout	121,222	58.11		121,222	57.84		
