= Ubombo =

Ubombo Obonjeni
- Location within KwaZulu-Natal Location within South Africa
- Coordinates: 27°34′S 32°05′E
- Country: South Africa
- Province: KwaZulu-Natal
- District: uMkhanyakude
- Municipality: Jozini

Area
  - Total: 9.44 km^{2} (3.64 sq mi)

Population (2011)
  - Total: 1,220
  - Density: 129/km^{2} (335/sq mi)

Racial makeup (2011)
  - Black African: 93.0%
  - Coloured: 2.9%
  - Indian/Asian: 2.0%
  - White: 2.0%
  - Other: 0.2%

First languages (2011)
  - Zulu: 91.3%
  - English: 6.8%
  - Other: 1.9%
- Time zone: UTC+2 (SAST)
- PO box: 3970
- Area code: 035

Ubombo, is a small town in northern KwaZulu-Natal, South Africa about 17 km north-east of Mkuze. It takes its name from the Lebombo Mountain range, on which it is situated. Derived from Zulu Lumbombo, ‘high mountain ridge’. The Zulu name for this village is Obonjeni, ‘on the ridge of the nose’, i.e. ‘ridge’.

The site and remains believed to be those of the camp where Sir David Bruce and his wife Mary worked between 1894 and 1897, and where Bruce discovered the causative agent of nagana, African trypanosomiasis ("sleeping sickness") and its transmission by the tsetse fly were discovered here.

Bethesda district hospital, founded by the Methodist Church is in this village. It started in 1932 and was initially built by Dr Robert Albert Turner who was the medical superintendent after being the District Surgeon and was a mission training hospital.

From the early 1950s, three prominent business families engaged in trade and transportation in Ubombo. Bob (Robert) Ueckermann and his wife Hazel and Bob's stepson David Irons operated a trading store and a bus transportation company. Percy and Sybil Hoff operated the Tradewinds Store which still exists, while Herbert (Sonny) Hoff and his wife Nina operated a store and butchery next door to the Hoff business. Percy Hoff was a respected politician and member of the Council for Coloured Affairs, and was well known for his fight for social justice and rights of the coloured people.

Percy Hoff eventually acquired Herbert Hoff's business and amalgamated the stores when Herbert's family left for present day Zimbabwe in the late 1960s. Tradewinds was eventually sold to Nelson Thring when Percy Hoff moved his family to Swaziland and ultimately to Canada.
