= Jozini =

- Location within KwaZulu-Natal Location within South Africa
- Coordinates: 27.430°S 32.067°E
- Country: South Africa
- Province: KwaZulu-Natal
- District: Umkhanyakude
- Municipality: Jozini

Area
  - Total: 4.16 km^{2} (1.61 sq mi)

Population (2011)
  - Total: 2,267
  - Density: 545/km^{2} (1,410/sq mi)

Racial makeup (2011)
  - Black African: 90.6%
  - Coloured: 0.3%
  - Indian/Asian: 4.3%
  - White: 3.2%
  - Other: 1.6%

First languages (2011)
  - Zulu: 84.2%
  - English: 5.8%
  - Afrikaans: 1.9%
  - Other: 8.1%
- Time zone: UTC+2 (SAST)
- PO box: 3969
- Area code: 035

Jozini is a settlement in Umkhanyakude District Municipality in the KwaZulu-Natal province of South Africa.

Jozini is a small town on the main route to Mozambique, and it is close to the Jozini or Pongolapoort Dam. Lake Jozini, as the dam is called, has become very popular as a Tiger fishing destination.
