= Urban sprawl =

Expansion of auto-oriented, low-density development in suburbs

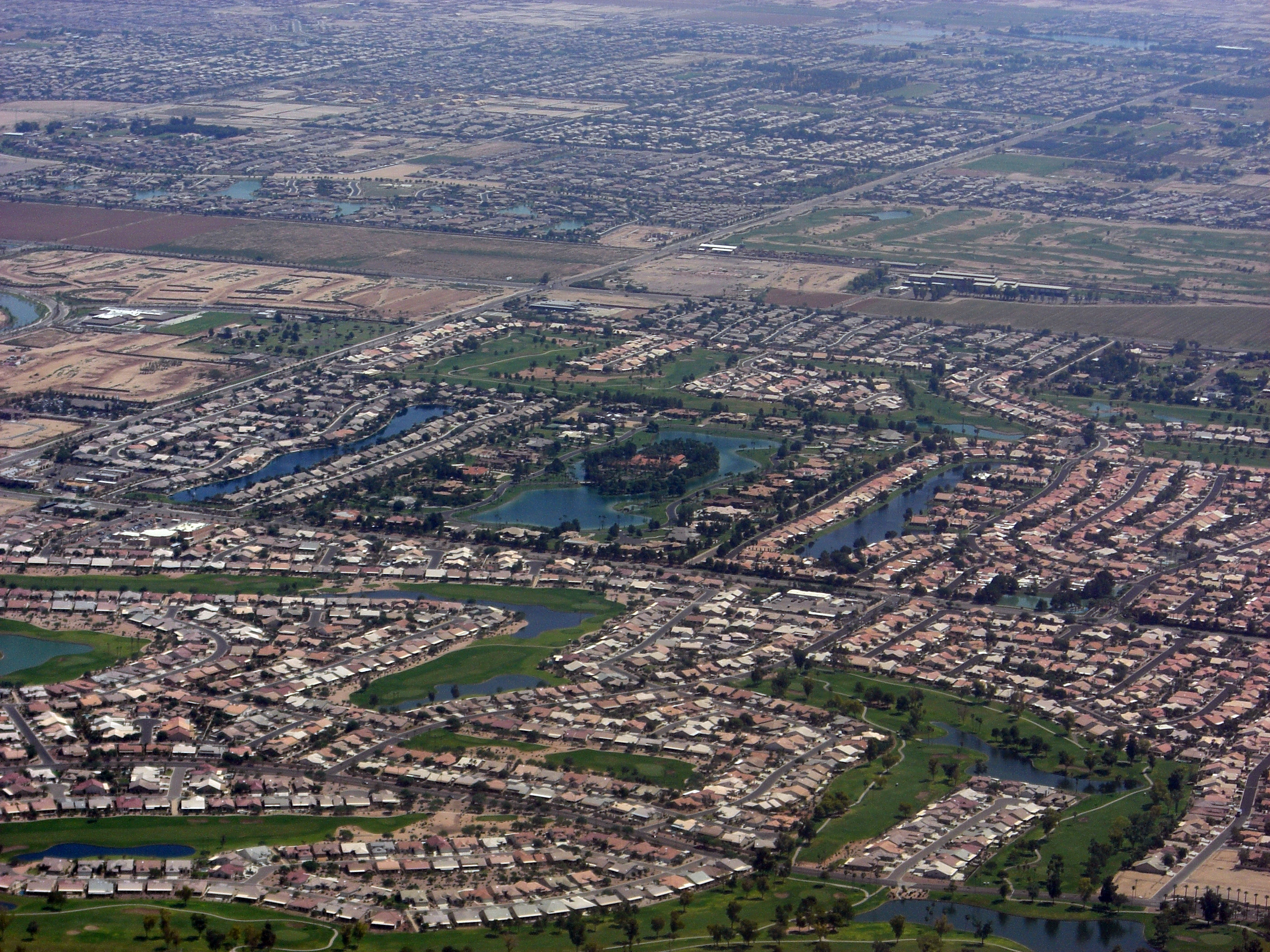
A typical suburban development in the United States, located in Chandler, Arizona

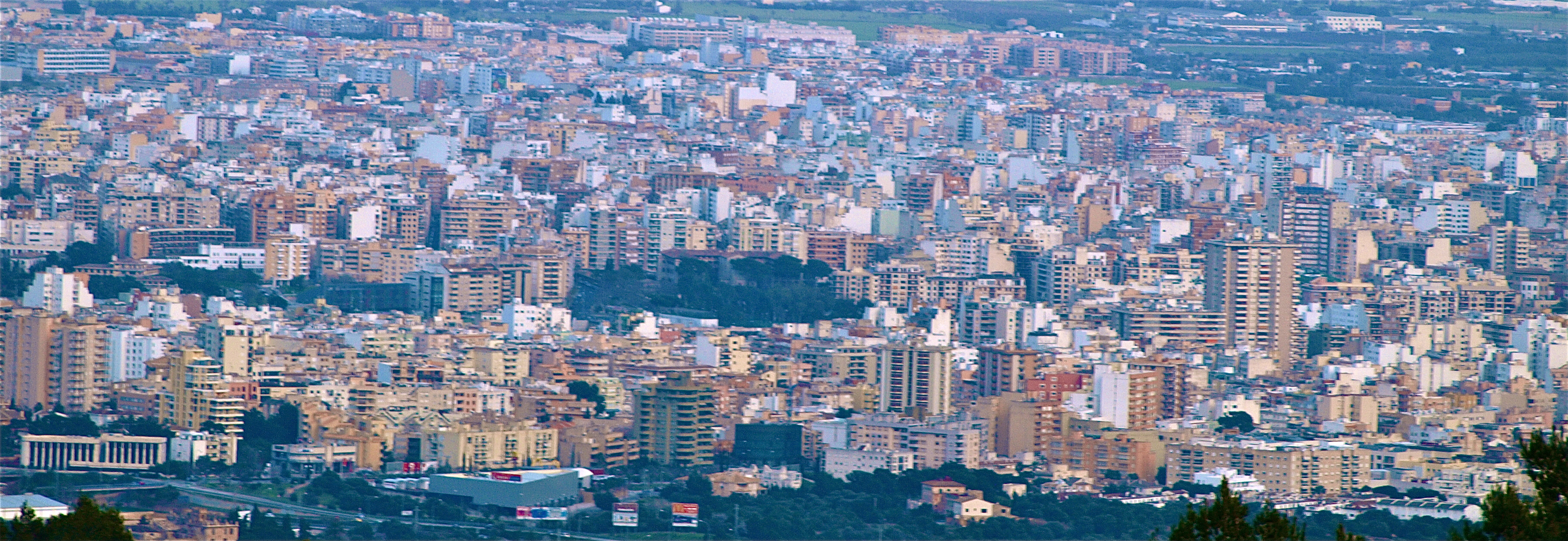
An urban development in Palma, Mallorca

Urban sprawl (also known as suburban sprawl or urban encroachment) is defined as "the rapid expansion of the geographic extent of cities and towns, often characterized by low-density residential housing, single-use zoning, and increased reliance on the private automobile for transportation". Urban sprawl has been described as the unrestricted spread over large expanses of land around an urban area of housing, commercial development, and roads, with little concern for very dense urban planning.

Urban sprawl refers to a special form of urbanization, and it relates to the social and environmental consequences associated with such development. In modern times some suburban areas described as "sprawl" have less detached housing and higher density than the nearby core city. Medieval suburbs suffered from the loss of protection of city walls, before the advent of industrial warfare. Sometimes the urban areas described as the most "sprawling" are the most densely populated.

The modern disadvantages and costs of urban sprawl include increased travel time, transport costs, pollution, and destruction of the countryside. The revenue for building and maintaining urban infrastructure in these areas is gained mostly through property and sales taxes. Most jobs in the US are now located in suburbs generating much of the revenue.

In Europe, the term peri-urbanisation is often used to denote similar dynamics and phenomena, but the term urban sprawl is currently being used by the European Environment Agency. There is widespread disagreement about what constitutes sprawl and how to quantify it. For example, some commentators measure sprawl by residential density, using the average residential units per acre in a given area. Others associate it with decentralization (spread of population without a well-defined centre), discontinuity (leapfrogging development, as defined below), segregation of uses, and so forth.

The term urban sprawl is highly politicized and almost always has negative connotations. It is criticized for causing environmental degradation, intensifying segregation, and undermining the vitality of existing urban areas, and is attacked on aesthetic grounds. Few people openly support urban sprawl as such, due to the pejorative connotations of the term. The term has become a rallying cry for managing urban growth.

== Definition ==
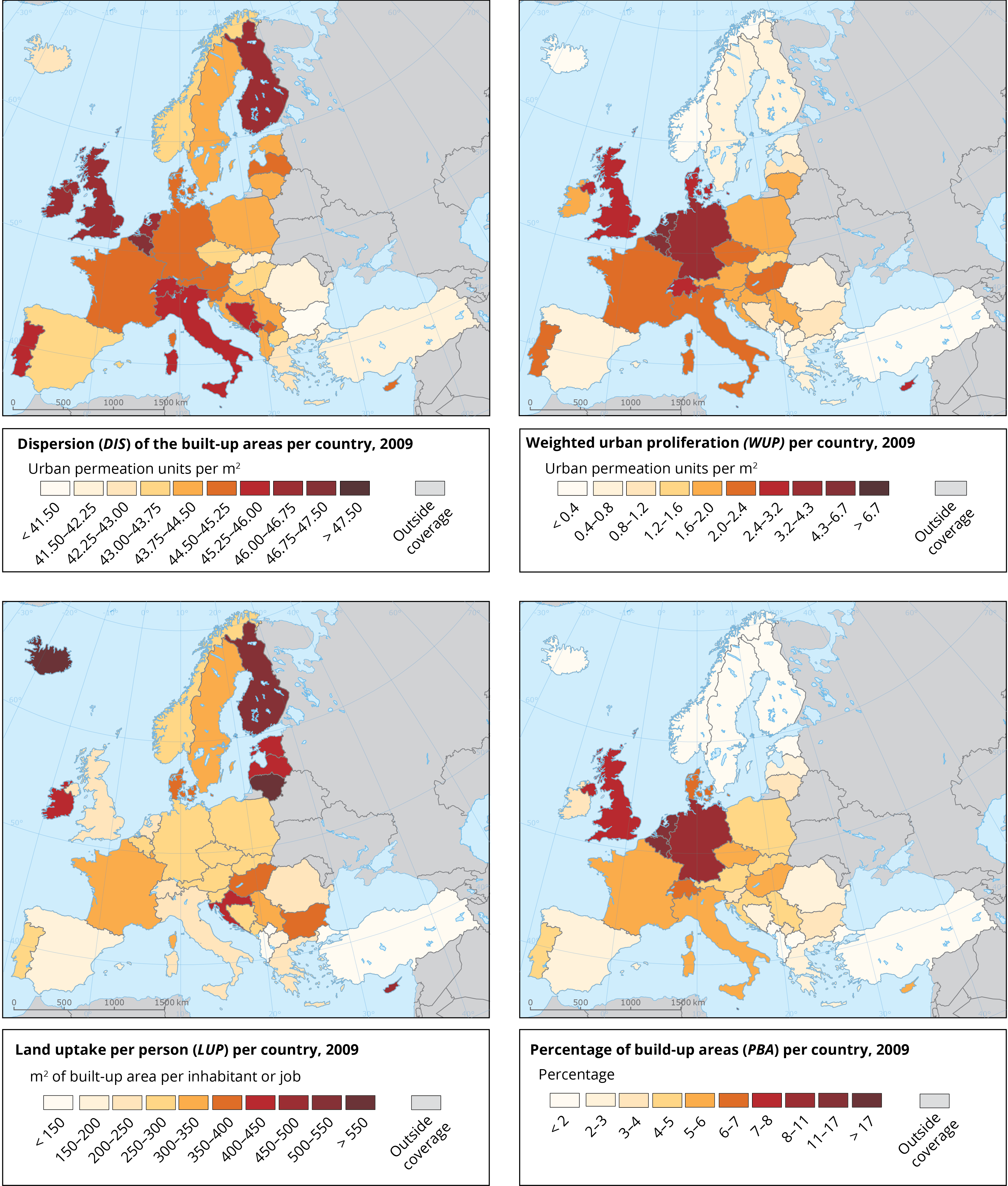
Measures for urban sprawl in Europe: upper left the Dispersion of the built-up area (DIS), upper right the weighted urban proliferation (WUP)

The term urban sprawl was often used in the letters between Lewis Mumford and Frederic J. Osborn, firstly by Osborn in his 1941 letter to Mumford and later by Mumford, generally condemning the waste of agricultural land and landscape due to suburban expansions. The term was used in an article in The Times in 1955 as a negative comment on the state of London's outskirts. Definitions of sprawl vary; researchers in the field acknowledge that the term lacks precision. Batty et al. defined sprawl as "uncoordinated growth: the expansion of community without concern for its consequences, in short, unplanned, incremental urban growth which is often regarded unsustainable". Bhatta et al. wrote in 2010 that despite a dispute over the precise definition of sprawl, there is a "general consensus that urban sprawl is characterized by [an] unplanned and uneven pattern of growth, driven by a multitude of processes and leading to inefficient resource utilization".

Reid Ewing has shown that sprawl has typically been characterized as urban developments exhibiting at least one of the following characteristics: low-density or single-use development, strip development, scattered development, and/or leapfrog development (areas of development interspersed with vacant land). He argued that a better way to identify sprawl was to use indicators rather than characteristics because this was a more flexible and less arbitrary method. He proposed using "accessibility" and "lack of functional open space" as indicators. Ewing's approach has been criticized for assuming that sprawl is defined by negative characteristics.

What constitutes sprawl may be considered a matter of degree and will always be somewhat subjective under many definitions of the term. Ewing has also argued that suburban development does not, per se, constitute sprawl depending on the form it takes, although Gordon & Richardson have argued that the term is sometimes used synonymously with suburbanization in a pejorative way.

=== Examples and counterexamples ===
According to the National Resources Inventory (NRI), about 44 million acres (69,000 sq mi; 180,000 km^{2}) of land in the United States was developed between 1982 and 2017. Presently, the NRI classifies approximately 100,000 more square kilometres (40,000 square miles) (an area approximately the size of Kentucky) as developed than the Census Bureau classifies as urban. The difference in the NRI classification is that it includes rural development, which by definition cannot be considered to be "urban" sprawl. According to the 2010 Census, approximately 3% of the U.S. land area is urban. As of 2010, 80.7% of the United States total population of 308,745,538 live within Urban areas.

Nonetheless, some urban areas like Detroit have expanded geographically even while losing population. But it was not just urbanized areas in the U.S. that lost population and sprawled substantially. According to data in "Cities and Automobile Dependence" by Kenworthy and Laube (1999), urbanized area population losses occurred while there was an expansion of sprawl between 1970 and 1990 in Amsterdam, Netherlands; Brussels, Belgium; Copenhagen, Denmark; Frankfurt, Hamburg and Munich, Germany; and Zürich, Switzerland, albeit without the dismantling of infrastructure that occurred in the United States.

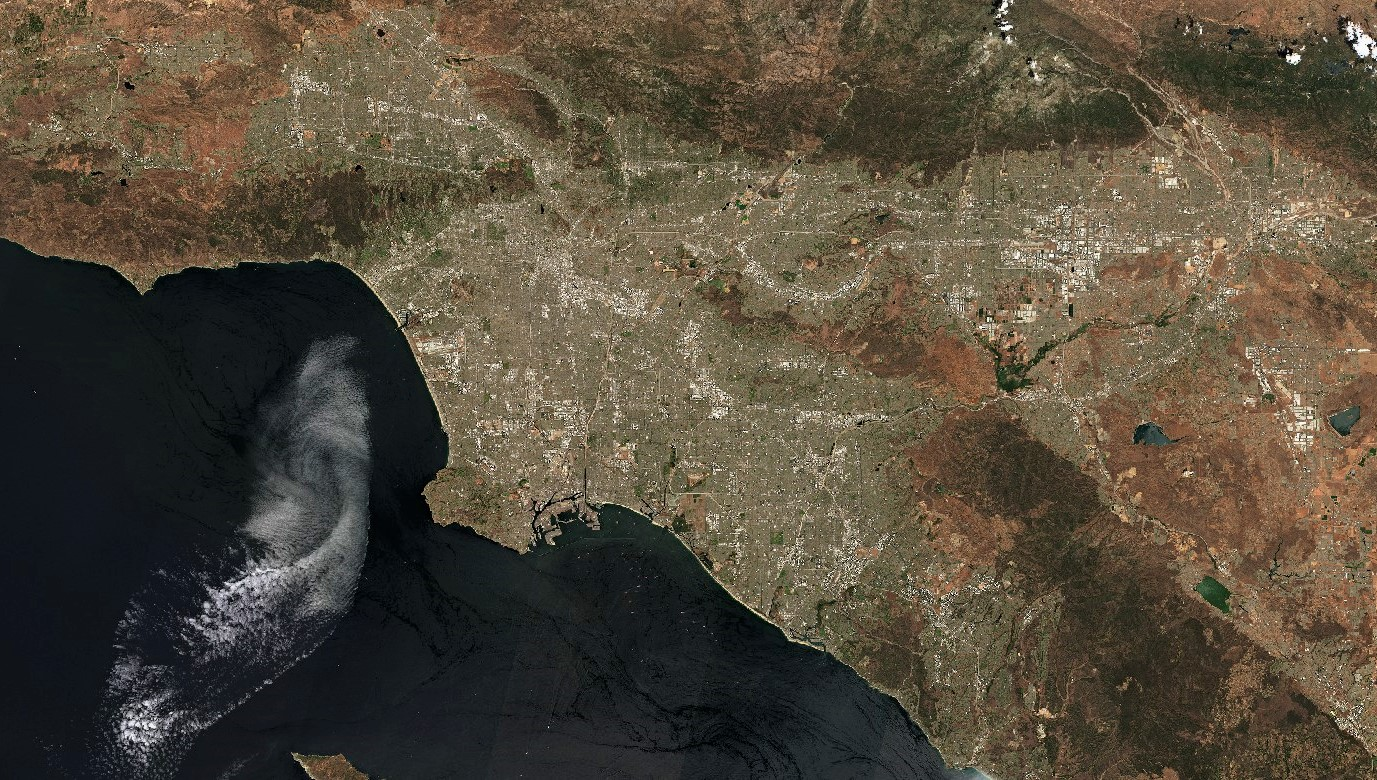
Despite its urban sprawl and car culture, Los Angeles is the densest major built-up urban area in the United States.

Despite its sprawl, Metropolitan Los Angeles is the densest major urban area (over 1,000,000 population) in the US, being denser than the New York urban area and the San Francisco urban area. Most of metropolitan Los Angeles is built at more uniform low to moderate density, leading to a much higher overall density for the entire region. This is in contrast to New York, San Francisco or Chicago which have compact, high-density cores surrounded by areas of very low-density suburban periphery, such as eastern Suffolk County in the New York metro area and Marin County in the San Francisco Bay Area.

Some cases of sprawl challenge the definition of the term and what conditions are necessary for urban growth to be considered sprawl. Metropolitan regions such as Greater Mexico City, Delhi National Capital Region Beijing, and the Greater Tokyo Area are often regarded as sprawling despite being relatively dense and mixed use.

== Causes ==
Many theories speculate as to the reason for the creation of urban sprawl and urban flight. The theory of "flight from blight" explains that aspects of living in urban areas, such as high taxes, crime rates, poor infrastructure and school qualities lead to many people moving out of urban areas and into surrounding suburban areas. According to The Limits to Growth, reasons why people move to suburbs include noise, pollution, crime, drug addiction, poverty, labor strikes, and breakdown of social services. One study found that on average each crime leads to about one additional person fleeing. Decreases in crime statistics tend to contribute to a reversal.

Others suggest that urban sprawl is a natural product of population increases, higher wages, and therefore better access to housing. Improvement in transportation also means that individuals are able to live further from large cities and industrial hubs, thus increasing demand for better housing further from the noise of cities. This leads to the creation of sprawling residential land development surrounding densely packed urban areas.

== Characteristics ==
Despite the lack of a clear agreed upon description of what defines sprawl most definitions often associate the following characteristics with sprawl.

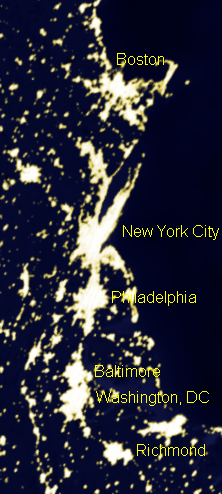
This picture shows the metropolitan areas of the Northeast Megalopolis of the United States demonstrating urban sprawl, including far-flung suburbs and exurbs illuminated at night.

=== Single-use development ===
This refers to a situation where commercial, residential, institutional and industrial areas are separated from one another. Consequently, large tracts of land are devoted to a single use and are segregated from one another by open space, infrastructure, or other barriers. As a result, the places where people live, work, shop, and recreate are far from one another, usually to the extent that walking, transit use and bicycling are impractical, so all these activities generally require a car. The degree to which different land uses are mixed together is often used as an indicator of sprawl in studies of the subject.

According to this criterion, China's urbanization can be classified as "high-density sprawl", a seemingly self-contradictory term coined by New Urbanist Peter Calthorpe. He explains that despite the high-rise buildings, China's superblocks (huge residential blocks) are largely single-use and surrounded by giant arterial roads, which detach different functions of a city and create an environment unfriendly to pedestrians.

=== Job sprawl and spatial mismatch ===
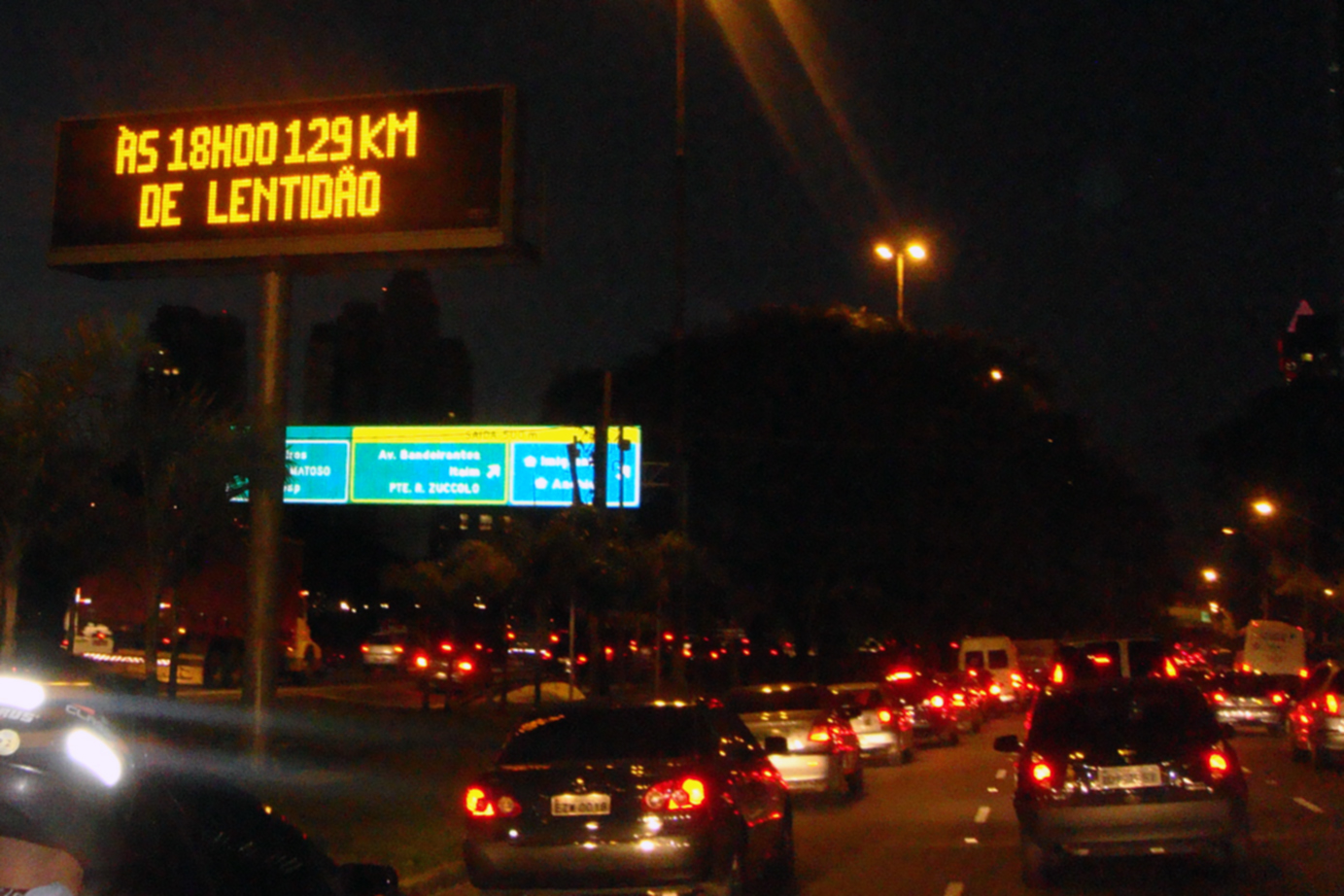
Traffic congestion in sprawling São Paulo, Brazil, which, according to Time magazine, has the world's worst traffic jams

Job sprawl is another land use symptom of urban sprawl and car-dependent communities. It is defined as low-density, geographically spread-out patterns of employment, where the majority of jobs in a given metropolitan area are located outside of the main city's central business district (CBD), and increasingly in the suburban periphery. It is often the result of urban disinvestment, the geographic freedom of employment location allowed by predominantly car-dependent commuting patterns of many American suburbs, and many companies' desire to locate in low-density areas that are often more affordable and offer potential for expansion. Spatial mismatch is related to job sprawl and economic environmental justice. Spatial mismatch is defined as the situation where poor urban, predominantly minority citizens are left without easy access to entry-level jobs, as a result of increasing job sprawl and limited transportation options to facilitate a reverse commute to the suburbs.

Job sprawl has been measured and documented in various ways. It has been shown to be a growing trend in America's metropolitan areas. The Brookings Institution has published multiple articles on the topic. In 2005, author Michael Stoll defined job sprawl simply as jobs located more than 5-mile (8.0 km) radius from the CBD, and measured the concept based on year 2000 U.S. census data. Other ways of measuring the concept with more detailed rings around the CBD include a 2001 article by Edward Glaeser and Elizabeth Kneebone's 2009 article, which show that sprawling urban peripheries are gaining employment while areas closer to the CBD are losing jobs. These two authors used three geographic rings limited to a 35-mile (56 km) radius around the CBD: 3 miles (4.8 km) or less, 3 to 10 miles (16 km), and 10 to 35 miles (56 km). Kneebone's study showed the following nationwide breakdown for the largest metropolitan areas in 2006: 21.3% of jobs located in the inner ring, 33.6% of jobs in the 3–10 mile ring, and 45.1% in the 10–35 mile ring. This compares to the year 1998 – 23.3%, 34.2%, and 42.5% in those respective rings. The study shows CBD employment share shrinking, and job growth focused in the suburban and exurban outer metropolitan rings.

=== Low-density ===
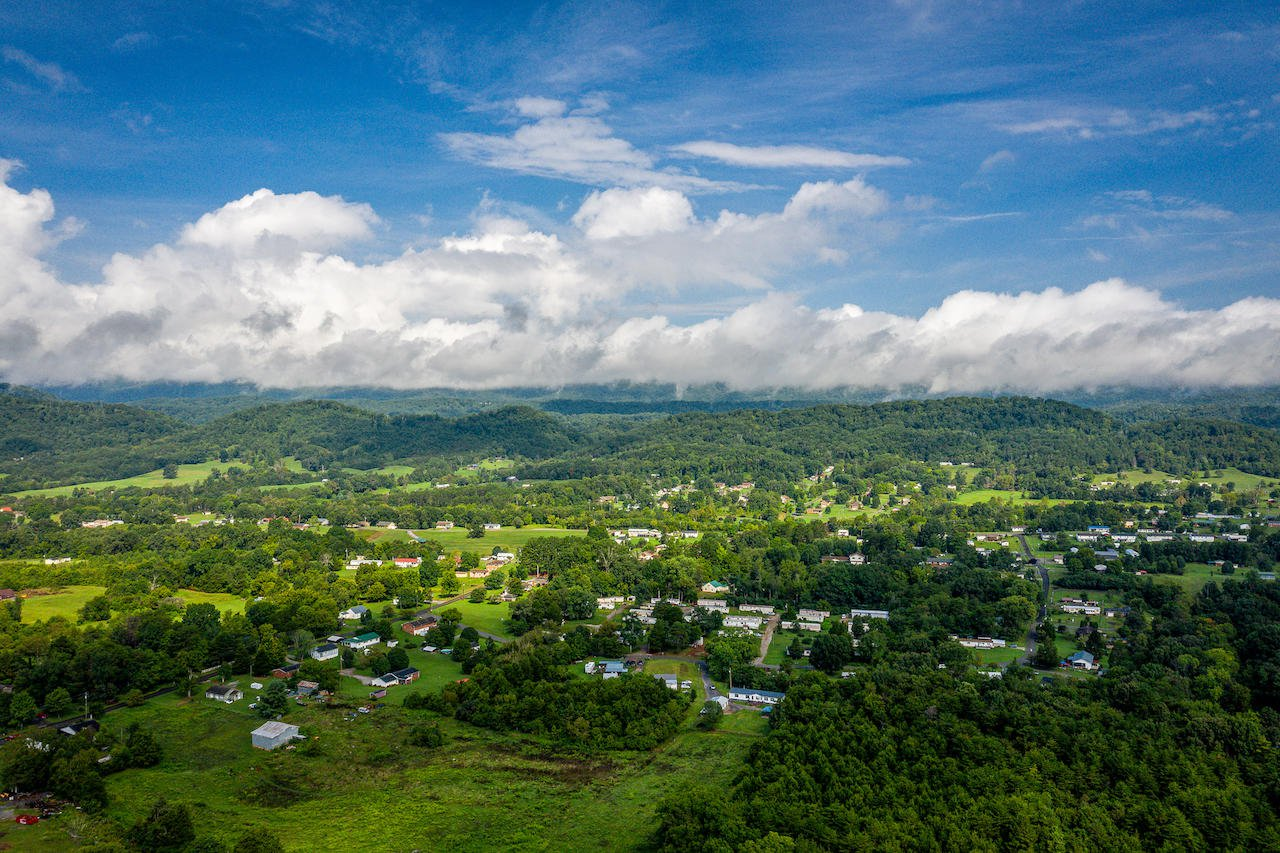
Low-density housing placed between large farms in an exurban community in Tennessee

Sprawl often refers to low-density development. There is no precise definition of "low density", but it might commonly mean single-family detached homes on large lots. Such buildings usually have fewer stories and are spaced farther apart, separated by lawns, landscaping, roads or parking lots. In the United States 2–4 houses per acre (5–10 per hectare) might be considered low-density while in the UK 8–12 per acre (or 20–30 per hectare) would still be considered low-density. Because more automobiles are used in the USA, much more land is designated for parking. The impact of low density development in many communities is that developed or "urbanized" land is increasing at a faster rate than the population is growing.

Overall density is often lowered by "leapfrog development". This term refers to the relationship, or lack of it, between subdivisions. Such developments are typically separated by large green belts, i.e. tracts of undeveloped land, resulting in an overall density far lower even than the low density indicated by localized per-acre measurements. This is a 20th and 21st century phenomenon generated by the current custom of requiring a developer to provide subdivision infrastructure as a condition of development. Usually, the developer is required to set aside a certain percentage of the developed land for public use, including roads, parks and schools. In the past, when a local government built all the streets in a given location, the town could expand without interruption and with a coherent circulation system, because it had condemnation power. Private developers generally do not have such power (although they can sometimes find local governments willing to help), and often choose to develop on the tracts that happen to be for sale at the time they want to build, rather than pay extra or wait for a more appropriate location.

Some research argues that religious ideas about how humans should live (and die) promote low-density development and may contribute to urban sprawl.

=== Conversion of agricultural land to urban use ===
Land for sprawl is often taken from fertile agricultural lands, which are often located immediately surrounding cities; the extent of modern sprawl has consumed a large amount of the most productive agricultural land, as well as forest, desert and other wilderness areas. In the United States the seller may avoid tax on profit by using a tax break exempting like-kind exchanges from capital gains tax; proceeds from the sale are used to purchase agricultural land elsewhere and the transaction is treated as a "swap" or trade of like assets and no tax is due. Thus urban sprawl is subsidized by the tax code. In China, land has been converted from rural to urban use in advance of demand, leading to vacant rural land intended for future development, and eventual urban sprawl.

=== Housing subdivisions ===
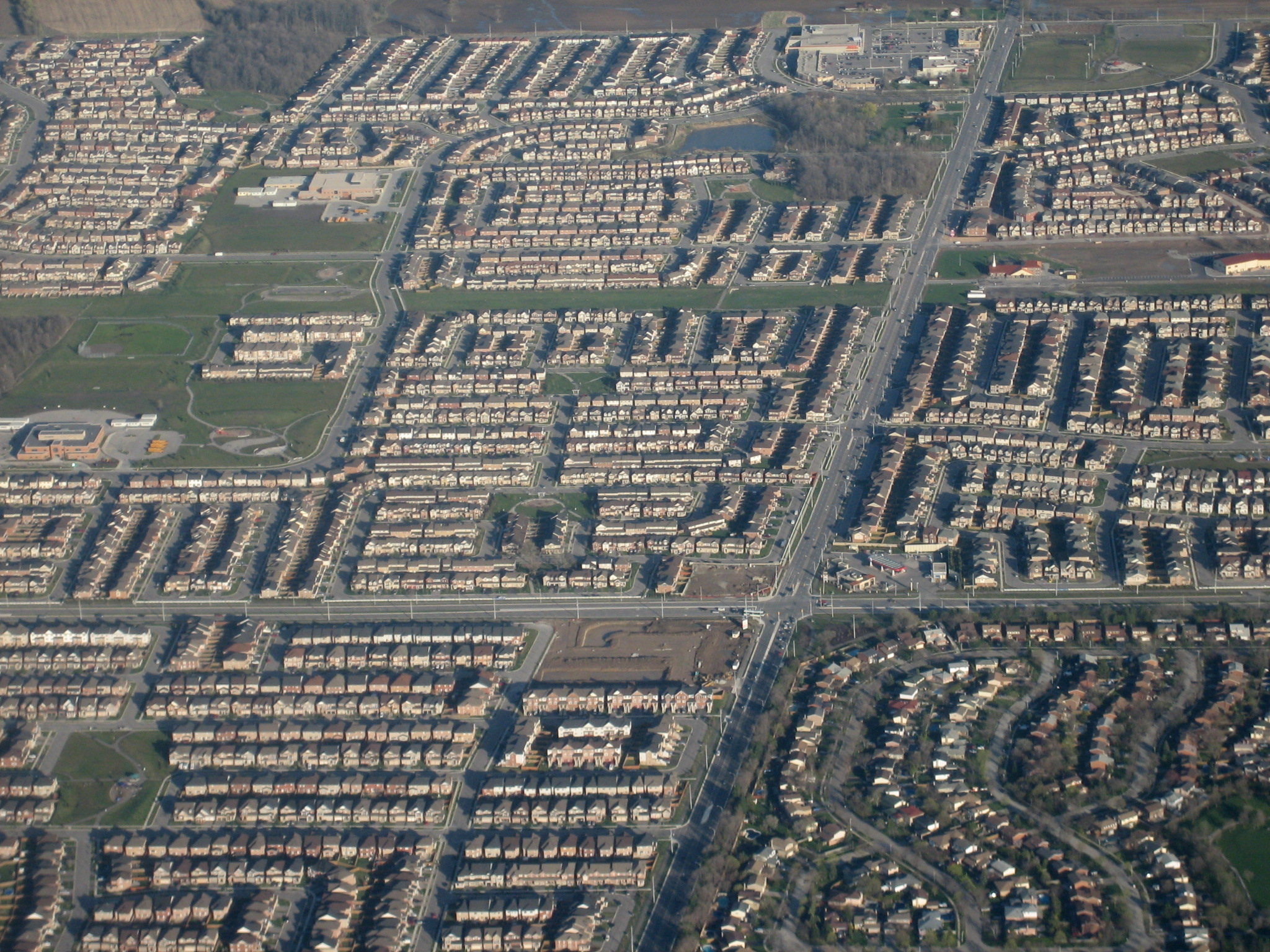
Sprawl in Milton, Ontario. This photograph is an example of Canadian exurban development, though recently attempts are made to reduce this type of development in many major cities.

Housing subdivisions are large tracts of land consisting entirely of newly built residences. New Urbanist architectural firm Duany Plater-Zyberk & Company states that housing subdivisions "are sometimes called villages, towns, and neighbourhoods by their developers, which is misleading since those terms denote places that are not exclusively residential". They are also referred to as developments. Land developers may adopt tract housing as a cost-saving measure, which often results in a lack of architectural diversity across houses.

Subdivisions often incorporate curved roads and cul-de-sacs. These subdivisions may offer only a few places to enter and exit the development, causing traffic to use high volume collector streets. All trips, no matter how short, must enter the collector road in a suburban system.

=== Lawn ===
After the Second World War, residential lawns became commonplace in suburbs, notably, but not exclusively in North America. The development of country clubs and golf courses in the early 20th century further promoted lawn culture in the United States. Lawns now take up a significant amount of land in suburban developments, contributing to sprawl.

=== Commercial developments ===
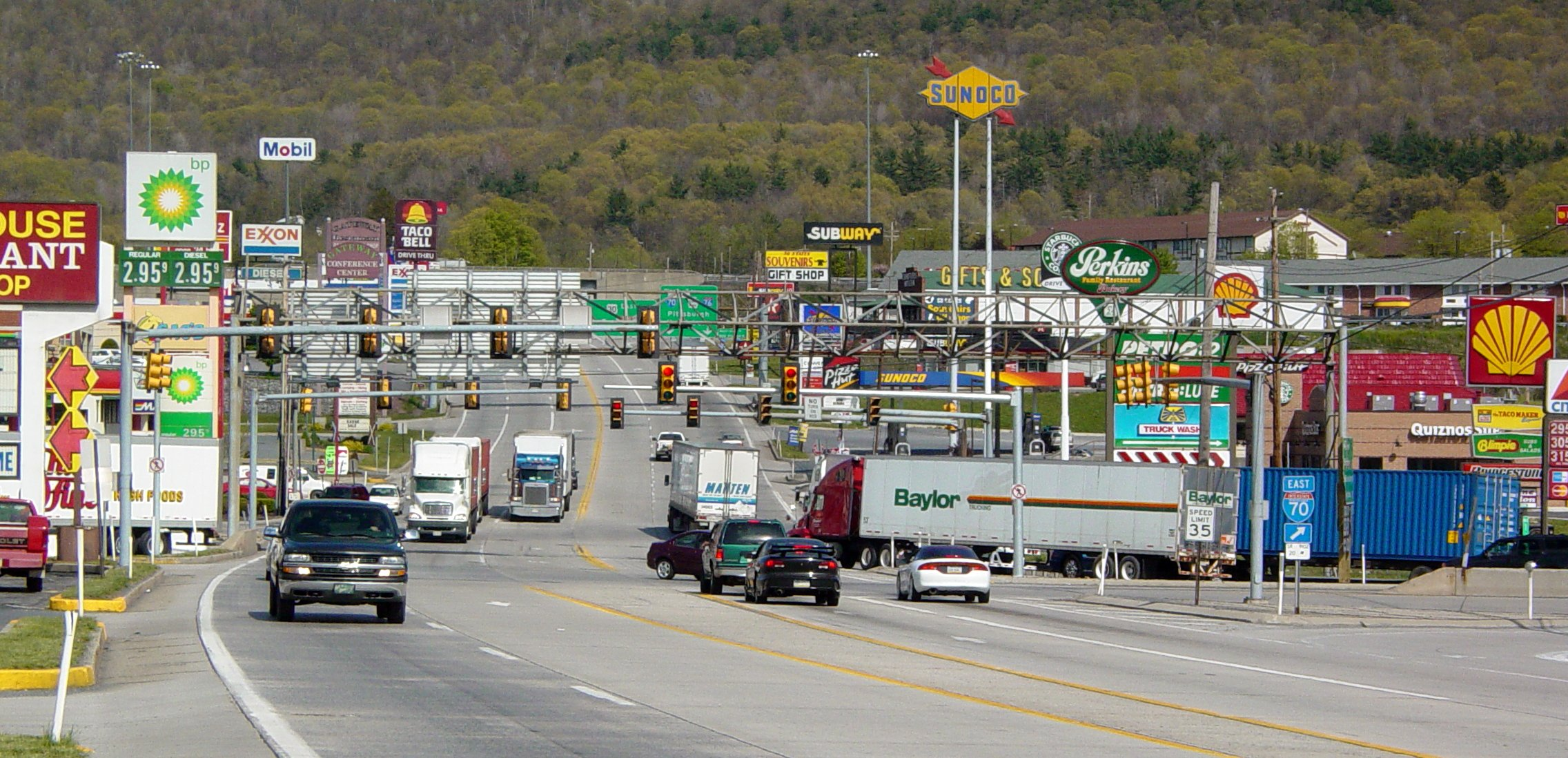
Clustered commercial strips like this one in Breezewood, Pennsylvania are common in outer rural exurbs and suburbs in metropolitan areas.

In areas of sprawl, commercial use is generally segregated from other uses. In the U.S. and Canada, these often take the form of strip malls, which refer to collections of buildings sharing a common parking lot, usually built on a high-capacity roadway with commercial functions (i.e., a "strip"). Similar developments in the United Kingdom are called Retail Parks. Strip malls consisting mostly of big box stores or category killers are sometimes called "power centers" (U.S.). These developments tend to be low-density; the buildings are single-story and there is ample space for parking and access for delivery vehicles. This character is reflected in the spacious landscaping of the parking lots and walkways and clear signage of the retail establishments. Some strip malls are undergoing a transformation into Lifestyle centers; entailing investments in common areas and facilities (plazas, cafes) and shifting tenancy from daily goods to recreational shopping.

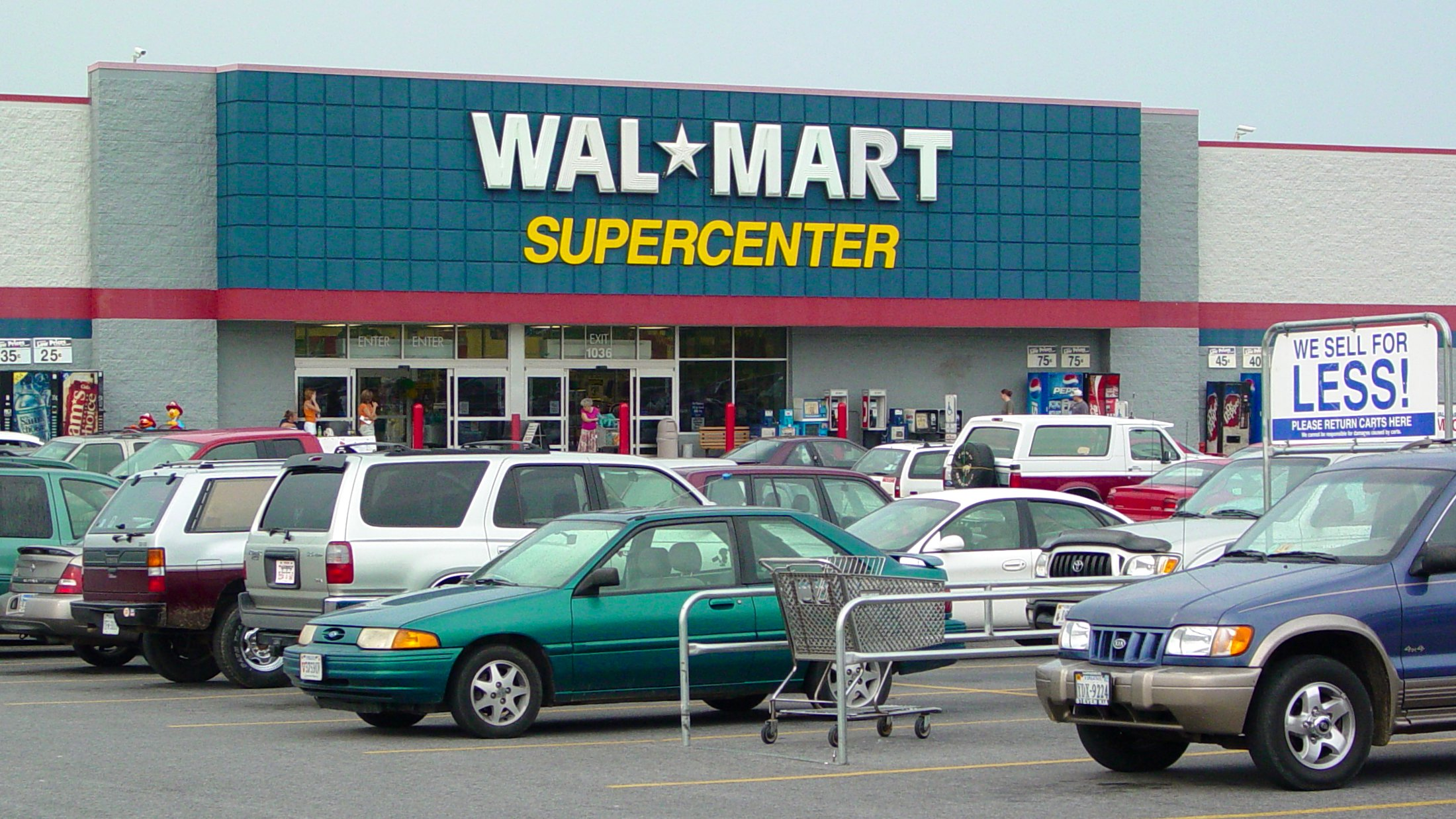
Walmart Supercenter in Luray, Virginia

Another prominent form of retail development in areas characterized by sprawl is the shopping mall. Unlike the strip mall, this is usually composed of a single building surrounded by a parking lot that contains multiple shops, usually "anchored" by one or more department stores. The function and size is also distinct from the strip mall. The focus is almost exclusively on recreational shopping rather than daily goods. Shopping malls also tend to serve a wider (regional) public and require higher-order infrastructure such as highway access and can have floorspaces in excess of 1 million sq ft (93,000 m^{2}). Shopping malls are often detrimental to downtown shopping centres of nearby cities since the shopping malls act as a surrogate for the city centre. Some downtowns have responded to this challenge by building shopping centres of their own.

Fast food chains are often built early in areas with low property values where the population is expected to boom and where large traffic is predicted, and set a precedent for future development. Eric Schlosser, in his book Fast Food Nation, argues that fast food chains accelerate suburban sprawl and help set its tone with their expansive parking lots, flashy signs, and plastic architecture (65). Duany Plater Zyberk & Company believe that this reinforces a destructive pattern of growth in an endless quest to move away from the sprawl that only results in creating more of it.

== Effects ==
=== Environmental ===
One of the major environmental problems associated with urban sprawl is land consumption, habitat loss, land pollution, subsequent reduction in biodiversity and destruction of local ecosystems. A review by Brian Czech and colleagues, finds that urbanization endangers more species and is more geographically ubiquitous in the mainland United States than any other human activity. Urban sprawl is disruptive to native flora & fauna and introduces invasive plants into their environments, which are considered to be harmful to local biomes. Although the effects can be mitigated through careful maintenance of native vegetation, the process of ecological succession and public education, sprawl represents one of the primary threats to biodiversity.

Regions with high birth rates and immigration are therefore faced with environmental problems due to unplanned urban growth and emerging megacities such as Kolkata, Shenzen, and Chongqing. Unregulated urban sprawl in these areas contributes to severe pollution, resource depletion, and ecosystem degradation. For instance, Kolkata's expansion has led to extensive deforestation and wetland destruction, endangering biodiversity and increasing flood risks. Additionally, Chongqing, as one of China's fastest-growing urban centers. struggles with severe air pollution due to its reliance on coal-powered industries, with particulate matter (PM2.5) levels often exceeding World Health Organization safety limits. The rapid expansion of urban infrastructure in such megacities increases greenhouse gas emissions, with transportation and construction sectors contributing significantly to climate change. Moreover, poor urban planning leads to inadequate sanitation and waste management systems, with cities like Kolkata generating over 5,000 metric tons of waste daily, much of which remains untreated and contributes to water contamination.

Other problems include:

- flooding, which results from increased impervious surfaces for roads and parking (see urban runoff)
- Reduce wildlife population and habitat space
- Loss of arable land
- Accelerate climate change in the region
- Affect regional hydrology, especially groundwater supply
- increased temperatures from heat islands, which leads to a significantly increased risk of mortality in elderly populations.

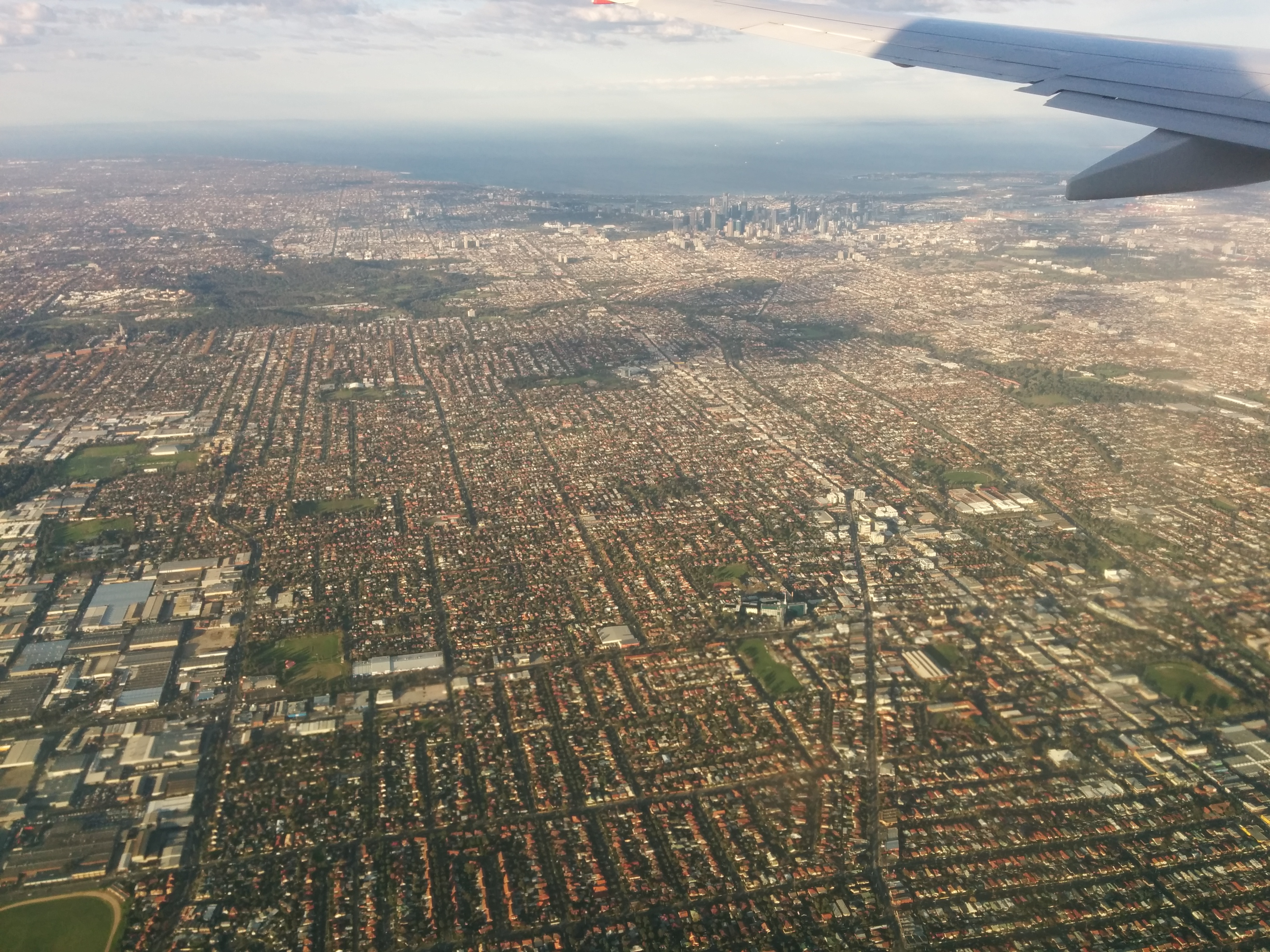
The urban sprawl of Melbourne

During the mid-to-late 20th century, many major cities in the United States, Western Europe, and Japan experienced population decline due to shrinking household sizes and suburbanization, leading to significant environmental impacts. The expansion of suburban areas resulted in increased land consumption, habitat fragmentation, and higher carbon emissions from car-dependent development. In the U.S., suburbanization was accelerated by policies favoring highway construction and single-family housing, contributing to urban sprawl and loss of arable land. While recent urban revitalization has slowed these trends, challenges such as rising energy demands, heat island effects, and pressure on water resources persist. At the same time, the urban cores of these and nearly all other major cities in the United States, Western Europe, and Japan that did not annex new territory experienced the related phenomena of falling household size and, particularly in the U.S. (see white flight) sustaining population losses. This trend has slowed somewhat in recent years, as more people have regained an interest in urban living.

Due to the larger area consumed by sprawling suburbs compared to urban neighborhoods, more farmland and wildlife habitats are displaced per resident. As forest cover is cleared and covered with impervious surfaces (concrete and asphalt) in the suburbs, rainfall is less effectively absorbed into the groundwater aquifers. This threatens both the quality and quantity of water supplies. Sprawl increases water pollution as rain water picks up gasoline, motor oil, heavy metals, and other pollutants in runoff from parking lots and roads.

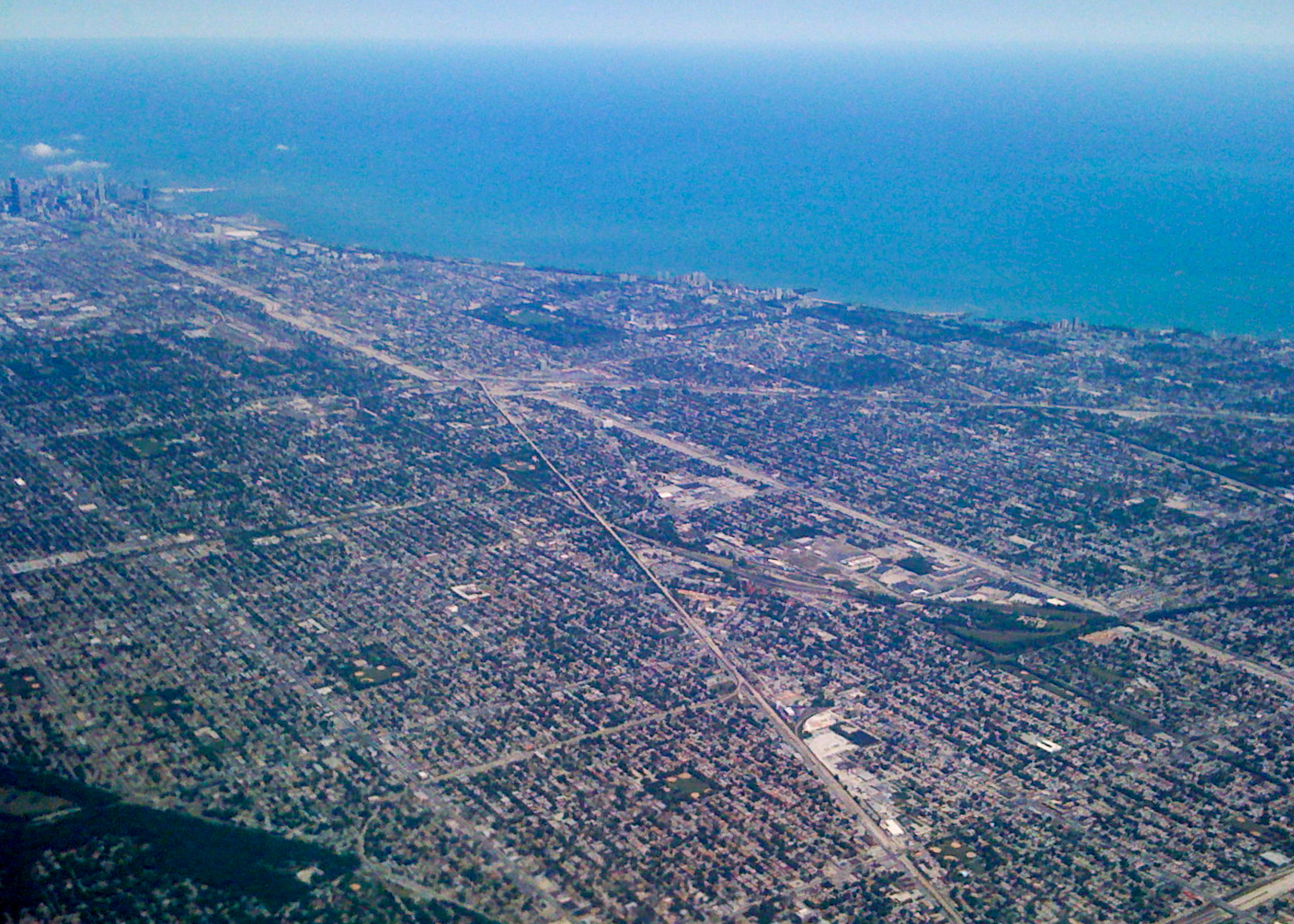
The Chicago metro area, nicknamed "Chicagoland"

Gordon & Richardson have argued that the conversion of agricultural land to urban use is not a problem due to the increasing efficiency of agricultural production; they argue that aggregate agricultural production is still more than sufficient to meet global food needs despite the expansion of urban land use.

=== Health ===
Sprawl leads to increased driving, which in turn leads to vehicle emissions that contribute to air pollution and its attendant negative impacts on human health. In addition, the reduced physical activity implied by increased automobile use has negative health consequences. Sprawl significantly predicts chronic medical conditions and health-related quality of life, but not mental health disorders. The American Journal of Public Health and the American Journal of Health Promotion, have both stated that there is a significant connection between sprawl, obesity, and hypertension. Loud vehicles can cause stress, prevent sleep, and minimize social interactions in public for people living in cities (especially homeless people).

In the years following World War II, when vehicle ownership was becoming widespread, public health officials recommended the health benefits of suburbs due to soot and industrial fumes in the city center. However, air in modern suburbs is not necessarily cleaner than air in urban neighborhoods. In fact, the most polluted air is on crowded highways, where people in suburbs tend to spend more time. On average, suburban residents generate more per capita pollution and carbon emissions than their urban counterparts because of their increased driving, as well as larger homes.

Sprawl also reduces the chance that people will take the bicycle for their commute which would be better for their health. Bicycles are a common mode of transportation for those living in urban centers due to many factors. One major factor many people consider relates to how, when one rides a bike to, say, their workplace, they are exercising as they do so. This multi-tasking is better for one's health than automatic transport.

A 2023 meta-analysis found that individuals living in sprawling areas had a 20% higher risk of obesity and a 15% higher risk of developing hypertension compared to residents of compact urban environments. Reduced walkability and longer commuting times were identified as key contributing factors.

=== Safety ===
A heavy reliance on automobiles increases traffic throughout the city as well as automobile crashes, pedestrian injuries, and air pollution. Motor vehicle crashes are the leading cause of death for Americans between the ages of five and twenty-four and is the leading accident-related cause for all age groups. Residents of more sprawling areas are generally at greater risk of dying in a car crash due to increased exposure to driving. Evidence indicates that pedestrians in sprawling areas are at higher risk than those in denser areas, although the relationship is less clear than for drivers and passengers in vehicles.

Research covered in the Journal of Economic Issues and State and Local Government Review shows a link between sprawl and emergency medical services response and fire department response delays.

=== Economy ===
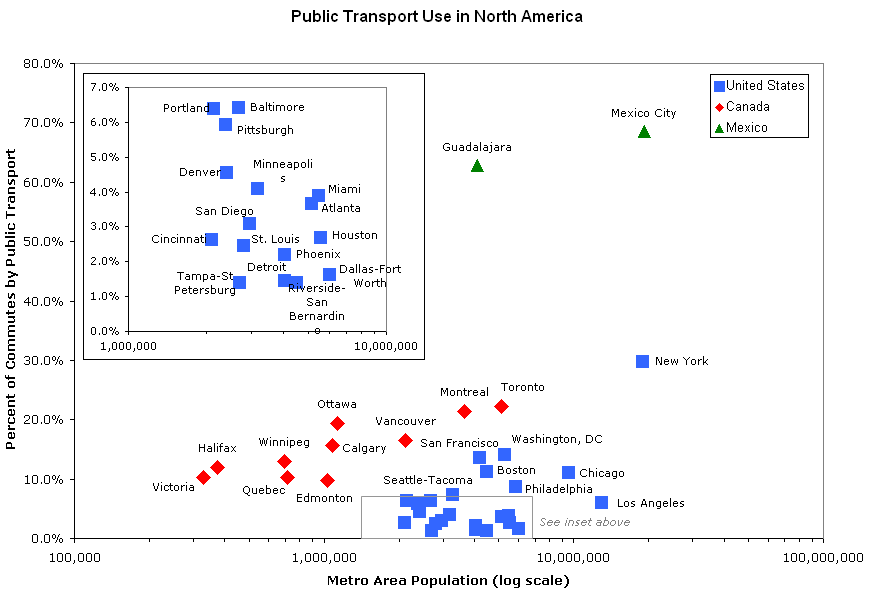
Chart showing public transport use in major cities in North America

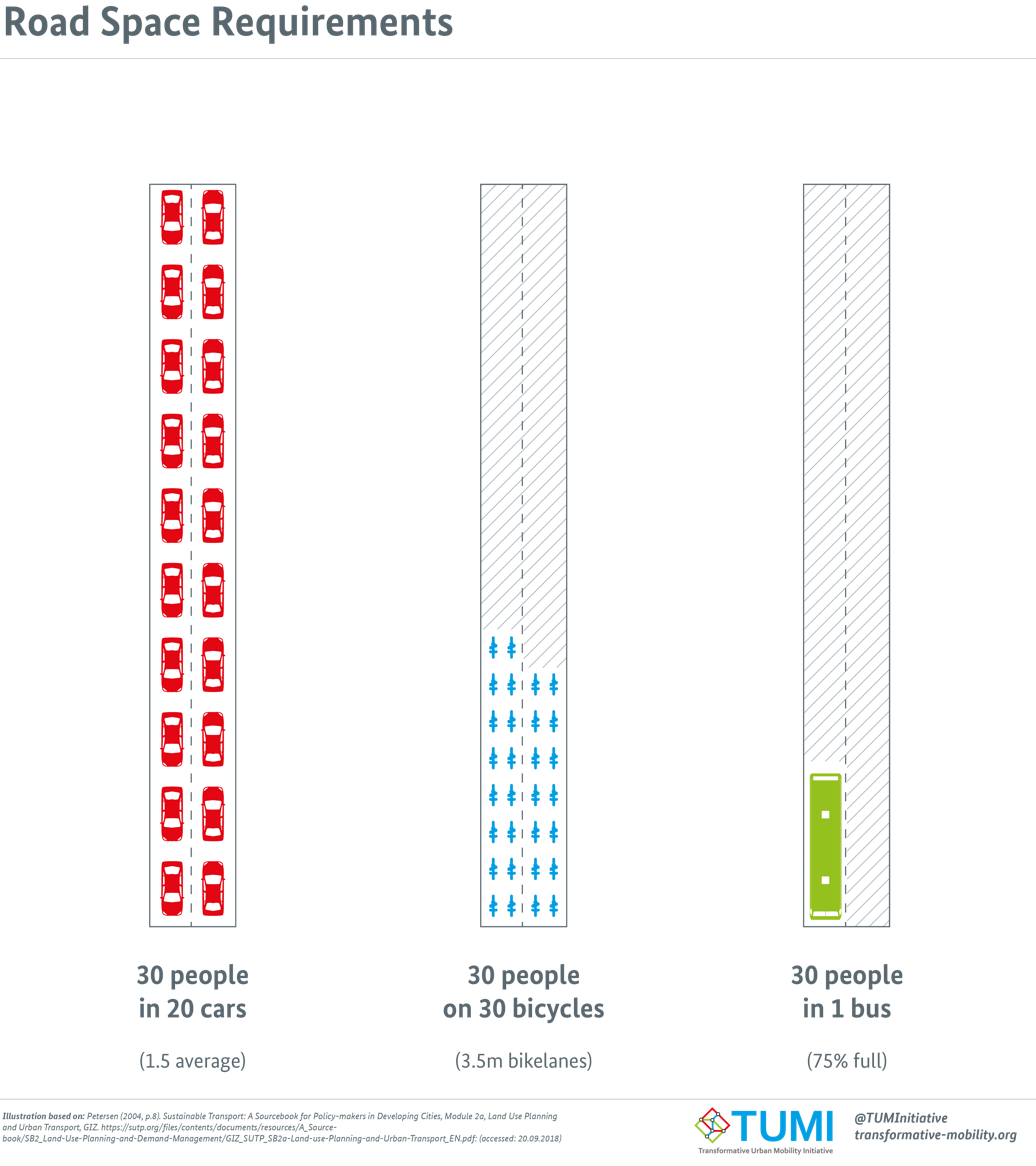
Road Space Requirements

Living in larger, more spread out spaces generally makes public services more expensive. Since car usage becomes endemic and public transport often becomes significantly more expensive, city planners are forced to build highway and parking infrastructure, which in turn decreases taxable land and revenue, and decreases the desirability of the area adjacent to such structures. Providing services such as water, sewers, road maintenance, and electricity is also more expensive per household in less dense areas, given that sprawl increases lengths of power lines, roads, and pipes, necessitating higher maintenance costs.

Residents of low-density areas spend a higher proportion of their income on transportation than residents of high density areas. The unplanned nature of outward urban development is commonly linked to increased dependency on cars. In 2003, a British newspaper calculated that urban sprawl would cause an economic loss of £3,905 per year, per person through cars alone, based on data from the RAC estimating that the average cost of operating a car in the UK at that time was £5,000 a year, while train travel (assuming a citizen commutes every day of the year, with a ticket cost of 3 pounds) would be only £1,095. Additionally, increased density increases the supply of housing in desirable areas, and thus, it also decreases housing prices in those areas (by the logic of supply and demand).

A 2022 Building & Cities report found that urban sprawl in Lagos, Nigeria, has significantly increased housing costs and displaced low-income populations into poorly connected suburban areas, deepening economic inequality and limiting access to employment opportunities and essential services. Similar patterns have been observed in other rapidly urbanizing regions, where the uncontrolled outward growth of cities disproportionately affects vulnerable populations.

Major cities – per capita petrol use vs. population density

=== Social ===
Urban sprawl may be partly responsible for the decline in social capital in the United States. Compact neighborhoods can foster casual social interactions among neighbors, while sprawl creates barriers. Sprawl tends to replace public spaces with private spaces such as fenced-in backyards.

Critics of sprawl maintain that sprawl erodes quality of life. Duany and Plater-Zyberk believe that in traditional neighborhoods the nearness of the workplace to retail and restaurant space that provides cafes and convenience stores with daytime customers is an essential component to the successful balance of urban life. Furthermore, they state that the closeness of the workplace to homes also gives people the option of walking or riding a bicycle to work or school and that without this kind of interaction between the different components of life the urban pattern quickly falls apart. James Howard Kunstler has argued that poor aesthetics in suburban environments make them "places not worth caring about", and that they lack a sense of history and identity.

Urban sprawl has class and racial implications in many parts of the world; the relative homogeneity of many sprawl developments may reinforce class and racial divides through residential segregation. Some studies link increased population density with increased aggression.

==== Increased vector-borne disease risk ====
Urban sprawl also leads to the loss of natural habitats and habitat fragmentation, which increases contact between wildlife (including those that carry pathogens) and human populations due to the disruption of their ecosystems. This expansion also creates favorable conditions for the spread of vector-borne diseases.

As cities grow, they often develop environments with stagnant water, increased humidity, and higher temperatures—ideal conditions for breeding disease-carrying mosquitoes. These conditions help facilitate the survival of mosquitoes, particularly Aedes species, which have been linked to the transmission of Zika, Malaria, and Chikungunya.

==== Environmental changes and disease emergence ====
Changes in land use are a major driver of emerging infectious diseases, as they influence species distribution, abundance, movement, and interactions—all of which affect the transmission of zoonotic diseases. For example, deforestation reduces the habitat of certain wildlife species, causing them to move closer to human settlements and ultimately increasing the likelihood of disease spillover.

The One Health framework emphasizes the interconnectedness of human, animal, and environmental health.

== Debate ==
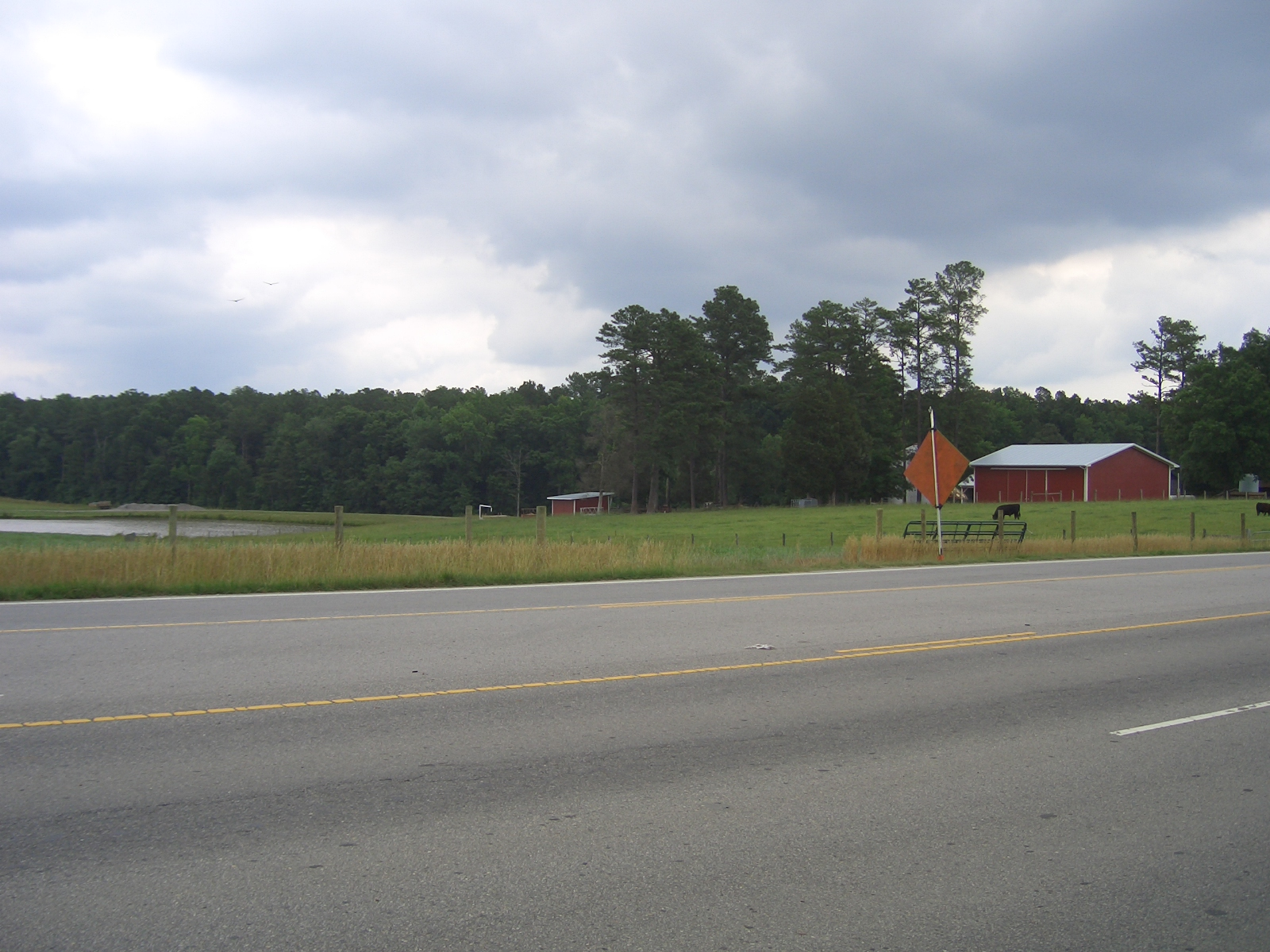
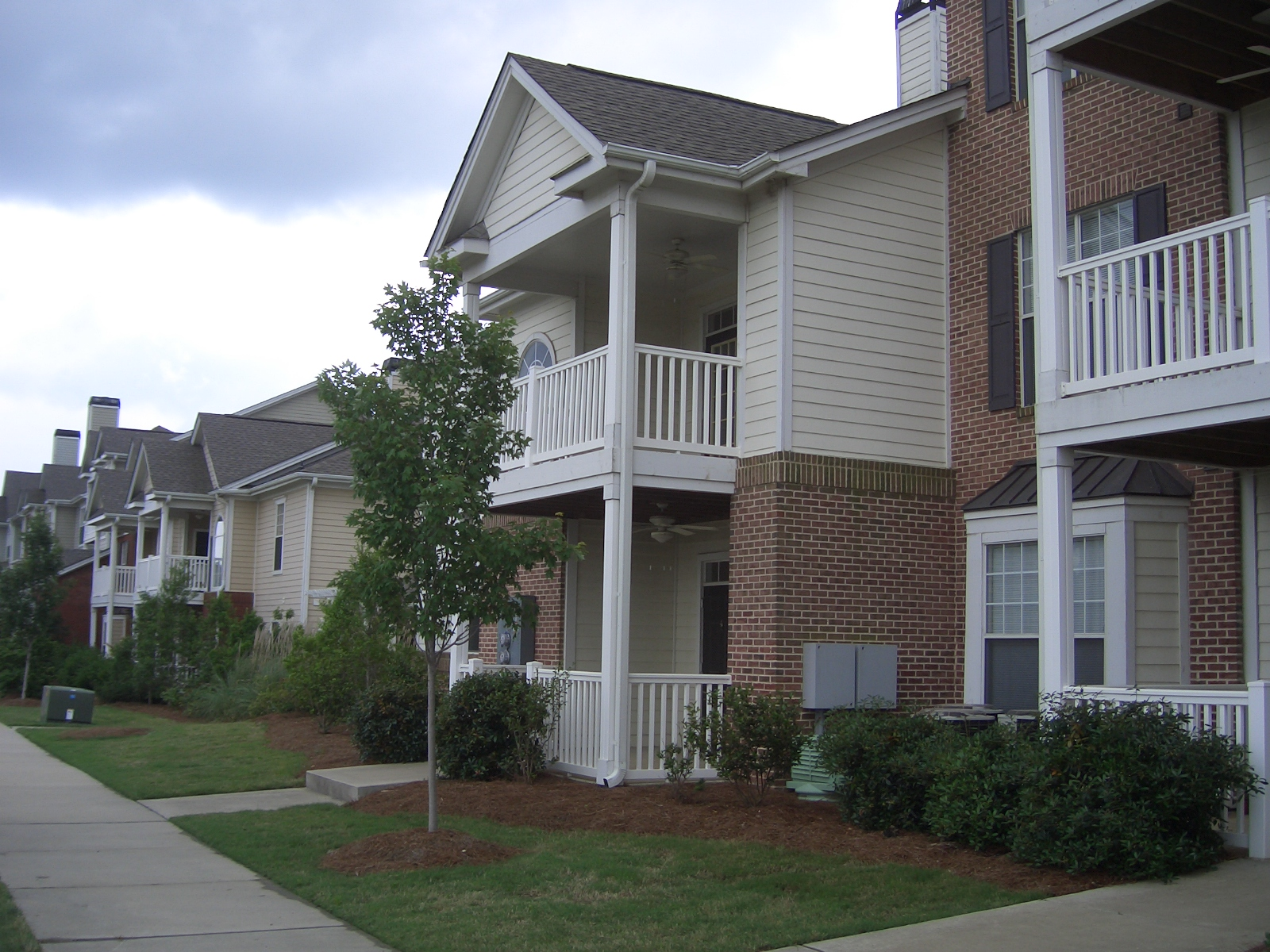
Rural neighborhoods in Morrisville, North Carolina are rapidly developing into affluent, urbanized neighborhoods and subdivisions. The two images above are on opposite sides of the same street.

According to Nancy Chin, a large number of effects of sprawl have been discussed in the academic literature in some detail; however, the most contentious issues can be reduced "to an older set of arguments, between those advocating a planning approach and those advocating the efficiency of the market". Those who criticize sprawl tend to argue that sprawl creates more problems than it solves and should be more heavily regulated, while proponents argue that markets are producing the economically most efficient settlements possible in most situations, even if problems may exist. However, some market-oriented commentators believe that the current patterns of sprawl are in fact the result of distortions of the free market. Chin cautions that there is a lack of "reliable empirical evidence to support the arguments made either for or against sprawl". She mentions that the lack of a common definition, the need for more quantitative measures "a broader view both in time and space, and greater comparison with alternative urban forms" would be necessary to draw firmer conclusions and conduct more fruitful debates.

Arguments opposing urban sprawl include concrete effects such as health and environmental issues as well as abstract consequences including neighborhood vitality. American public policy analyst Randal O'Toole of the Cato Institute, a libertarian think tank, has argued that sprawl, thanks to the automobile, gave rise to affordable suburban neighborhoods for middle class and lower class individuals, including non-whites. He notes that efforts to combat sprawl often result in subsidizing development in wealthier and whiter neighborhoods while condemning and demolishing poorer minority neighborhoods.

=== Groups that oppose sprawl ===
The American Institute of Architects, American Planning Association, and Smart Growth America recommend against sprawl and instead endorses smart, mixed-use development, including buildings in close proximity to one another that cut down on automobile use, save energy, and promote walkable, healthy, well-designed neighborhoods. The Sierra Club, the San Francisco Bay Area's Greenbelt Alliance, 1000 Friends of Oregon and counterpart organizations nationwide, and other environmental organizations oppose sprawl and support investment in existing communities. NumbersUSA, a national organization advocating immigration reduction, also opposes urban sprawl, and its founder, Roy Beck, specializes in the study of this issue.

=== Consumer preference ===
One of the primary debates around suburban sprawl is the extent to which sprawl is the result of consumer preference. Some, such as Peter Gordon, a professor of planning and economics at the University of Southern California's School of Urban Planning and Development, argue that most households have shown a clear preference for low-density living and that this is a fact that should not be ignored by planners. Gordon and his frequent collaborator, Harry Richardson have argued that

The principle of consumer sovereignty has played a powerful role in the increase in America's wealth and in the welfare of its citizens. Producers (including developers) have responded rapidly to households' demands. It is a giant step backward to interfere with this effective process unless the benefits of intervention substantially exceed its cost.

They argue that sprawl generates enough benefits for consumers that they continue to choose it as a form of development over alternative forms, as demonstrated by the continued focus on sprawl type developments by most developers. However, other academics such as Reid Ewing argue that while a large segment of people prefer suburban living that does not mean that sprawl itself is preferred by consumers, and that a large variety of suburban environments satisfy consumer demand, including areas that mitigate the worst effects of sprawl. Others, for example Kenneth T. Jackson have argued that since low-density housing is often (notably in the U.S.) subsidized in a variety of ways, consumers' professed preferences for this type of living may be over-stated.

=== Automobile dependency ===
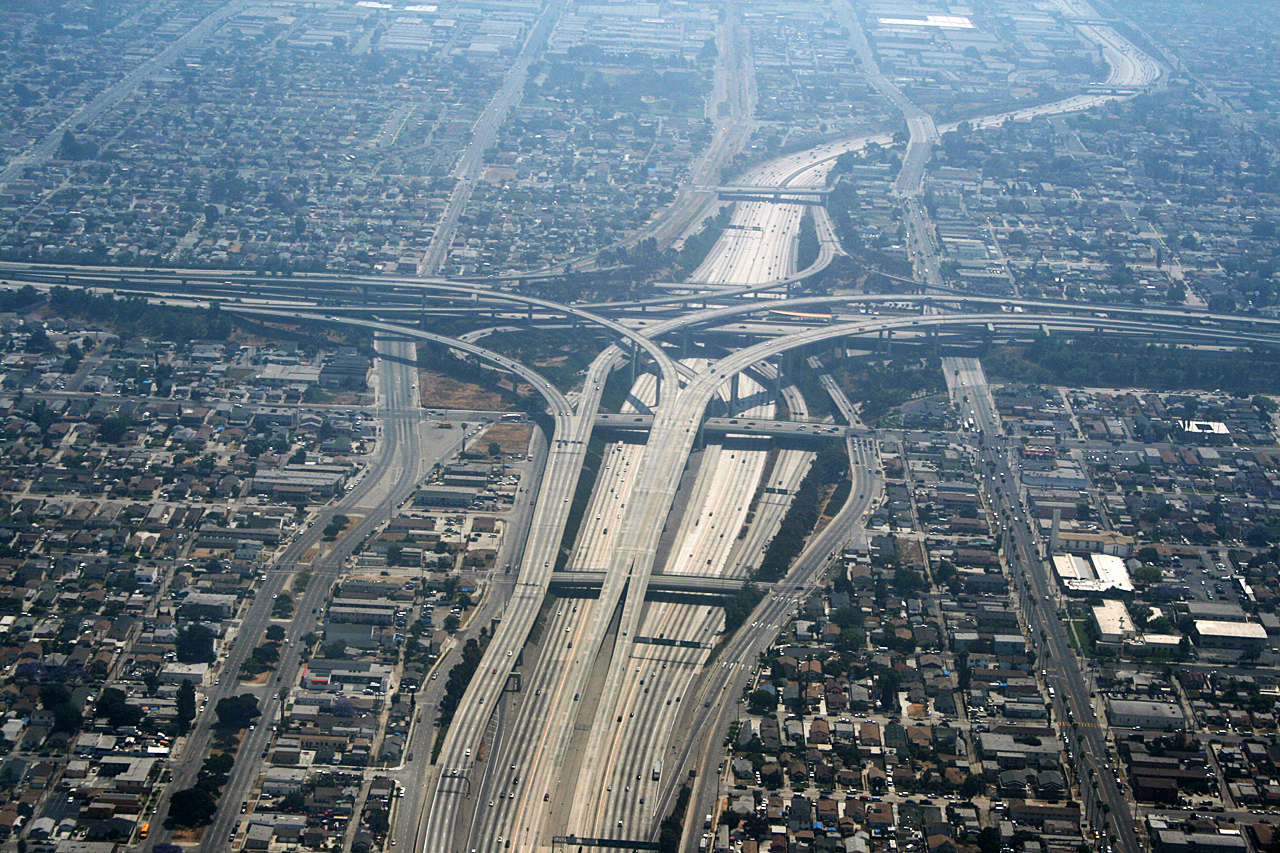
A majority of Californians live, commute, and work in the vast and extensive web of Southern California freeways.

Whether urban sprawl increases the problems of automobile dependency or not, policies of smart growth have been fiercely contested issues over several decades. An influential study in 1989 by Peter Newman and Jeff Kenworthy compared 32 cities across North America, Australia, Europe and Asia. The study has been criticised for its methodology, but the main finding, that denser cities, particularly in Asia, have lower car use than sprawling cities, particularly in North America, has been largely accepted, although the relationship is clearer at the extremes across continents than it is within countries where conditions are more similar.

Within cities, studies from across many countries (mainly in the developed world) have shown that denser urban areas with greater mixture of land use and better public transport tend to have lower car use than less dense suburban and ex-urban residential areas. This usually holds true even after controlling for socio-economic factors such as differences in household composition and income. This does not necessarily imply that suburban sprawl causes high car use, however. One confounding factor, which has been the subject of many studies, is residential self-selection: people who prefer to drive tend to move towards low density suburbs, whereas people who prefer to walk, cycle or use transit tend to move towards higher density urban areas, better served by public transport. Some studies have found that, when self-selection is controlled for, the built environment has no significant effect on travel behavior. More recent studies using more sophisticated methodologies have generally refuted these findings: density, land use and public transport accessibility can influence travel behavior, although social and economic factors, particularly household income, usually exert a stronger influence.

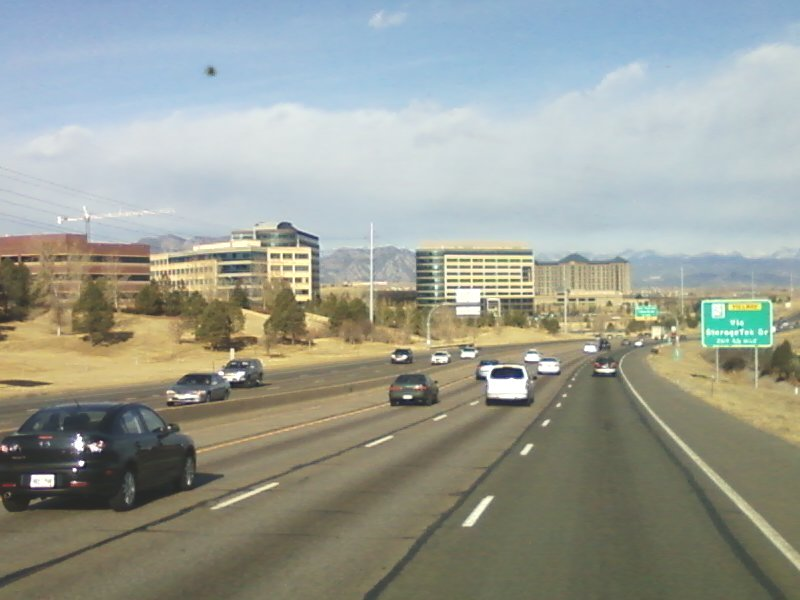
Business parks are strongly linked to car-dependent sprawl.

Those not opposed to low density development argue that traffic intensities tend to be less, traffic speeds faster and, as a result, ambient air pollution is lower. Kansas City, Missouri is often cited as an example of ideal low-density development, with congestion below the mean and home prices below comparable Midwestern cities. Wendell Cox and Randal O'Toole are leading figures supporting lower density development.

Longitudinal (time-lapse) studies of commute times in major metropolitan areas in the United States have shown that commute times decreased for the period 1969 to 1995 even though the geographic size of the city increased. Other studies suggest, however, that possible personal benefits from commute time savings have been at the expense of environmental costs in the form of longer average commute distances, rising vehicles-miles-traveled (VMT) per worker, and despite road expansions, worsening traffic congestion.

=== Transportation inequality ===
Critics of urban sprawl say that the United States' improper treatment of minority groups' access to transportation is a major downside to the continuation of urban sprawl. In many urban centers, such as Los Angeles and San Francisco, transportation in minority areas is lacking. As found by Kate Baldridge of Golden Gate University Law, areas with high minority populations typically see less than adequate transportation options, leading to overcrowded and unsafe transportation routes that do not provide a comprehensive means of transportation. This disparity is made more evident because minority residents are more reliant on public transportation. According to Baldridge, this means that minority groups cannot move from urban areas, while people with higher incomes and thus better access to transportation can move out of urban areas and into surrounding suburbs.

=== Paradox of intensification ===
Reviewing the evidence on urban intensification, smart growth and their effects on travel behaviour Melia et al. (2011) found support for the arguments of both supporters and opponents of smart growth measures to counteract urban sprawl. Planning policies that increase population densities in urban areas do tend to reduce car use, but the effect is a weak one, so doubling the population density of a particular area will not halve the frequency or distance of car use.

These findings led them to propose the paradox of intensification, which states:

Ceteris paribus, urban intensification which increases population density will reduce per capita car use, with benefits to the global environment, but will also increase concentrations of motor traffic, worsening the local environment in those locations where it occurs.

=== Risk of increased housing prices ===
There is also some concern that anti-sprawl policies will increase housing prices. Some research suggests Oregon has had the largest housing affordability loss in the nation, but other research shows that Portland's price increases are comparable to other Western cities.

In Australia, it is claimed by some that housing affordability has hit "crisis levels" due to "urban consolidation" policies implemented by state governments. In Sydney, the ratio of the price of a house relative to income is 9:1. The issue has at times been debated between the major political parties.

=== Proposed alternatives ===
Many critics concede that sprawl produces some negative externalities; however there is some dispute about the most effective way to reduce these negative effects. Gordon & Richardson for example argue that the costs of building new public transit is disproportionate to the actual environmental or economic benefits, that land use restrictions will increase the cost of housing and restrict economic opportunity, that infill possibilities are too limited to make a major difference to the structure of American cities, and that the government would need to coerce most people to live in a way that they do not want to in order to substantially change the impact of sprawl. They argue that the property market should be deregulated to allow different people to live as they wish, while providing a framework of market based fees (such as emission fees, congestion charging or road pricing) to mitigate many of the problems associated with sprawl such as congestion and increased pollution.

Several cities have adopted strategies to curb urban sprawl effectively. Portland, Oregon, established an Urban Growth Boundary (UGB) to contain development within a designated area, promoting higher-density, walkable neighborhoods and preserving surrounding farmland. Singapore has pioneered Transit-Oriented Development (TOD), concentrating housing, employment, and services around an extensive mass transit system to minimize automobile dependency and urban expansion. London's longstanding Greenbelt policy restricts urban development beyond specific zones to protect green space and control metropolitan growth.

== Alternative development styles ==
=== Early attempts at combatting urban sprawl ===
Designated areas of green belt in England Metropolitan Green Belt, first proposed by the London County Council in 1935

Starting in the early 20th century, environmentalist opposition to urban sprawl began to coalesce, with roots in the garden city movement, as well as pressure from campaign groups such as the Campaign to Protect Rural England (CPRE).

Under Herbert Morrison's 1934 leadership of the London County Council, the first formal proposal was made by the Greater London Regional Planning Committee "to provide a reserve supply of public open spaces and of recreational areas and to establish a green belt or girdle of open space". It was again included in an advisory Greater London Plan prepared by Patrick Abercrombie in 1944. The Town and Country Planning Act of 1947 expressly incorporated green belts into all further national urban developments.

New provisions for compensation in the 1947 Town and Country Planning Act allowed local authorities around the country to incorporate green belt proposals in their first development plans. The codification of Green Belt policy and its extension to areas other than London came with the historic Circular 42/55 inviting local planning authorities to consider the establishment of Green Belts. The first urban growth boundary in the U.S. was in Fayette County, Kentucky, in 1958.

==== Maryland ====
Maryland underwent many "Smart Growth" initiatives, starting in 1997 with the Smart Growth Areas Act. This act allocated funding towards areas already undergoing growth or areas with development plans. Maryland also implemented the 1997 Rural Legacy Act, which distributed grants to private land owners and allowed them to purchase development rights. Brownfields Voluntary Cleanup and Revitalization Incentive Programs also incentivized property owners to use previously contaminated properties to avoid liability for the property. The state also offered incentives, such as tax breaks and loans for repairs to contaminated areas. Another program the state of Maryland created was the Job Creation Tax Credit Program, which encouraged businesses to relocate to select areas, reducing the intensity of urban sprawl in some areas. The Live Near Your Work Program also incentivized employees to purchase homes closer to work. This led to a reduced commute time and more emphasis on homeownership rather than renting.

=== Contemporary anti-sprawl initiatives ===
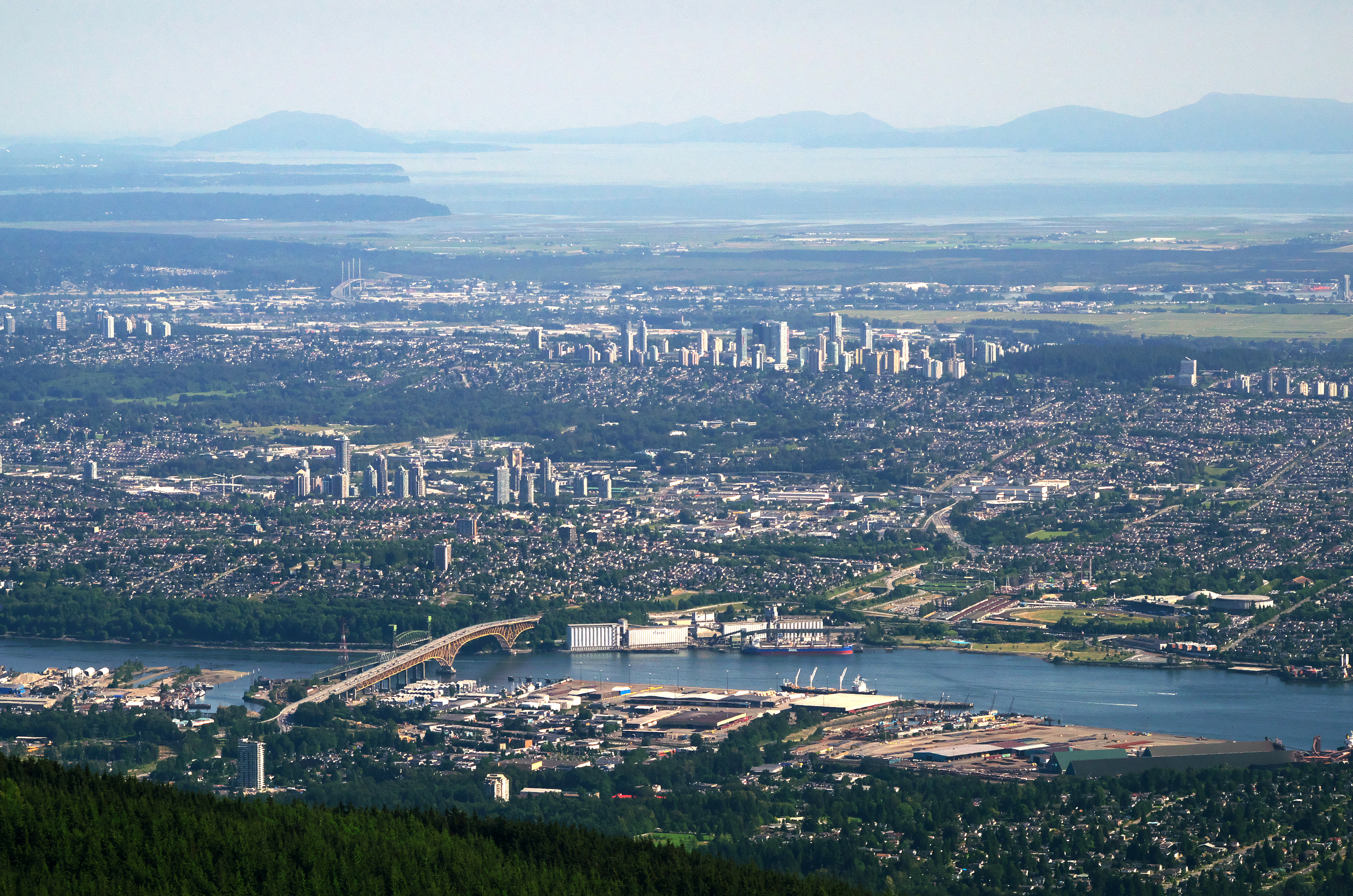
Many Canadian cities feature numerous pockets of high density throughout even their most distant suburbs. As a result, some Canadian suburbs have skylines that eclipse the downtowns of many American cities. Pictured are the skylines of Burnaby, British Columbia, a suburb of Vancouver.

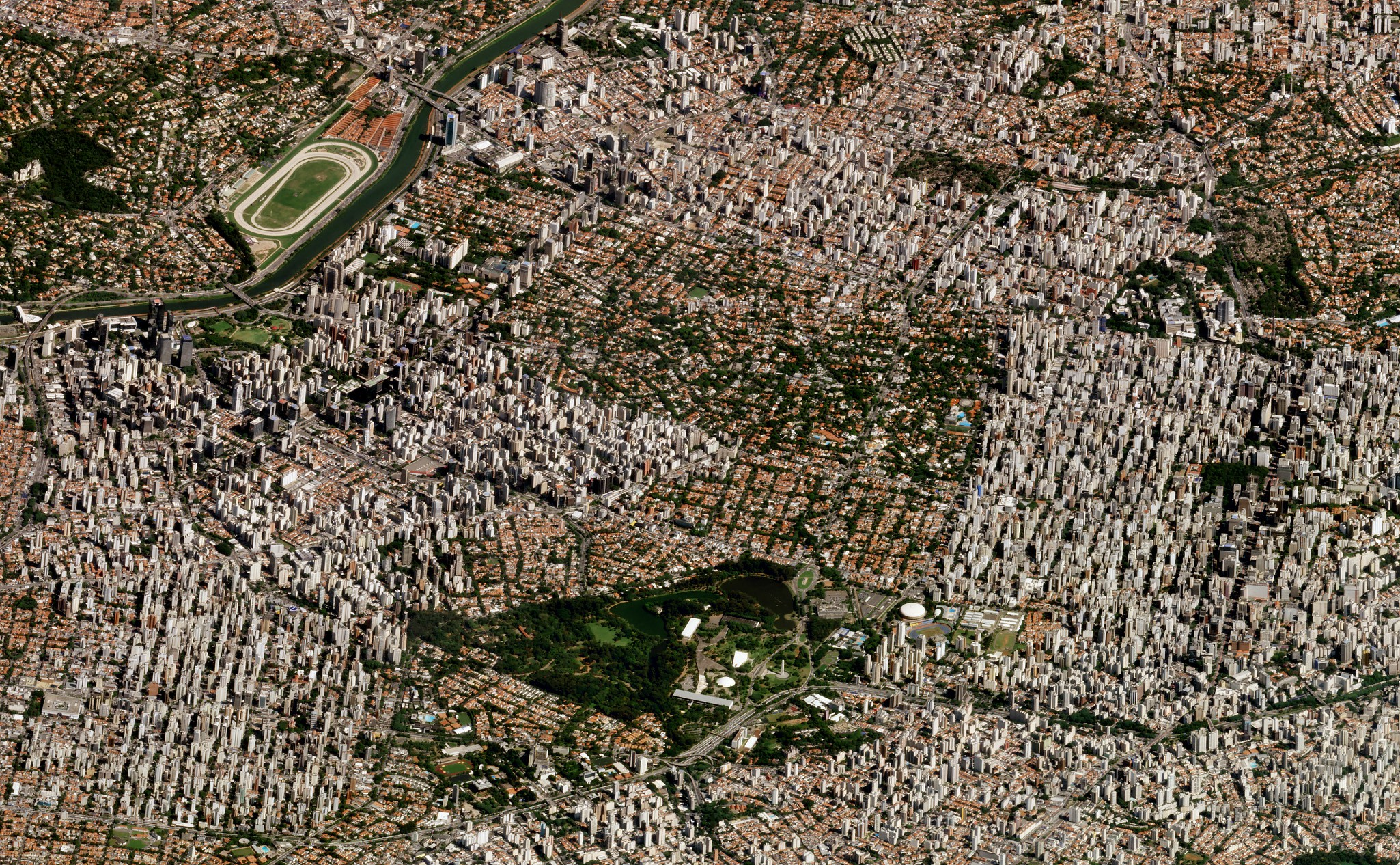
Urban fabric in São Paulo, the largest city in Brazil: side by side, vertical areas and low houses.

The term "smart growth" has been particularly used in North America. The terms "compact city" and "urban intensification" are often used to describe similar concepts in Europe, and particularly in the UK, where it has influenced government policy and planning practice in recent years.

The state of Oregon enacted a law in 1973 limiting the area urban areas could occupy, through urban growth boundaries. As a result, Portland, the state's largest urban area, has become a leader in smart growth policies that seek to make urban areas more compact (they are called urban consolidation policies). After the creation of this boundary, the population density of the urbanized area increased somewhat (from 1,135 in 1970 to 1,290 per km^{2} in 2000.) Although the growth boundary has not been tight enough to vastly increase density, the consensus is that the growth boundaries have protected great amounts of wild areas and farmland around the metro area.

Much of San Francisco Bay Area has also adopted urban growth boundaries; 25 of its cities and 5 of its counties have urban growth boundaries. Many of these were adopted with the support and advocacy of Greenbelt Alliance, a non-profit land conservation and urban planning organization.

In other areas, the design principles of New Urbanism have been employed to combat urban sprawl. The concept of circular flow land use management has been developed in Europe to reduce land take by urban sprawl through promoting inner-city and brownfield development.

Although cities such as Los Angeles are well known for sprawling suburbs, policies and public opinion are changing. Transit-oriented development, in which higher-density mixed-use areas are permitted or encouraged near transit stops, is encouraging more compact development in certain areas: particularly those with light and heavy rail transit systems.

Bicycles are the preferred means of travel in many countries: Also, bicycles are permitted in public transit. Businesses in areas of some towns in which bicycle use is high are thriving. Bicycles and transit contribute in two important ways toward the success of businesses:

1. People living the closest to these business districts on average have more money to spend locally because they spend less on their cars.
2. Because such people rely more on bicycling, walking, and transit than on driving, they tend to focus more of their commerce on locally owned neighborhood businesses that are convenient for them to reach.

Walkability is a measure of how friendly an area is to walking. Walkability has many health, environmental, and economic benefits. However, evaluating walkability is challenging because it requires the consideration of many subjective factors. Factors influencing walkability include the presence or absence and quality of footpaths, sidewalks, or other pedestrian right-of-ways, traffic and road conditions, land use patterns, building accessibility, and safety, among others. Walkability is an important concept in sustainable urban design.

Land use policies are one potential avenue to reduce the effects of urban sprawl. These policies take the form of boundaries to urban growth, regional development rights, and development centralized in urban areas. Housing policies, such as inclusionary zoning, rental vouchers in suburban areas, and a focus on employer-assisted housing are another approach to combatting urban sprawl. Gasoline taxes and increased funding towards the construction of public transportation also help to reduce the necessity of commuting in and out of urban areas.

== See also ==
=== Related topics ===
- Conurbation – Group of settlements linked by continuous urban area
- Effects of the car on societies – Overview of the effects of cars on various societies
- Gentrification – Urban socioeconomic process
- General Motors streetcar conspiracy – Alleged conspiracy by GM and others to replace streetcar lines with buses
- Index of urban studies articles
- Principles of intelligent urbanism – Theory of urban planning
- Rural–urban fringe – Type of urban growth
- Ribbon development – Development along a single road
- Town centre – Commercial or geographical centre or core area of a town
- Waste management – Activities and actions required to manage waste from its source to its final disposal
- Wildland–urban interface – Transition zone between wilderness and developed land

=== Related terminology ===
- Affluenza – Socio-psychological effects of consumerism
- Boomburb – Large, suburban-like city
- Commuter town – Urban community from which most of the workforce commutes out
- Concentric zone model – Urban social structure model
- Conspicuous consumption – Concept in sociology and economy
- Consumerism – Acquisition of goods beyond essential needs
- Deforestation – Conversion of forest to non-forest for human use
- Demography – Study of human populations and their structures
- Edge city – New unstructured settlement created near a major city
- Garden real estate – Specialized sector of the property market
- Habitat fragmentation – Discontinuities in an organism's environment causing population fragmentation
- Induced demand – Phenomenon in which supply increases lead to a cycle of increased consumption
- Landscape ecology – Relationships between ecological processes in the environment and particular ecosystems
- Land value tax – Levy on the unimproved value of land
- Location Efficient Mortgage
- Megacity – Urban area with a total population in excess of ten million people
- Microdistrict – Residential complex in the Soviet Union and post-Soviet states
- NIMBY – Opposition to nearby development projects
- Overconsumption – Resource use exceeding carrying capacity
- Peak oil – Point in time when the maximum rate of petroleum extraction is reached
- Planned community – Settlement built according to a plan
- Prime farmland
- Rural flight – Migratory pattern of people from rural to urban areas
- Simple living – Simplified, minimalistic lifestyle
- Spatial planning – Technique for physical organisation of space
- Streetcar suburb – Residential community developed by streetcar lines
- Urban decay – Sociological process affecting cities
- World population – Total number of living humans on Earth
