= Pachypodium habitats =

Pachypodium habitats consist of isolated, specialized, micro–environmental niches, generally xeric, rocky, frost-free areas within parts of western Madagascar and southern Africa. Pachypodium species are often indifferent to the regional ecological, biotic zone of vegetation, a fact which explains some of Pachypodium morphology and architecture. The large scale vegetation zones are in some cases irrelevant to the micro-environments of Pachypodium, in the sense that the xeric niches may be embedded in larger mesic biomes.

Most Pachypodium are rupicolous species occur on rocky outcrops, steep hills, and on inselbergs or kopjes, land or rocky masses which have resisted erosion and stand isolated in level or gently sloping terrain, sometimes above a forest canopy. Rocky outcrops, steep hills, and inselbergs create microclimate conditions that may be different from the general climate of a region.

The habitats of Pachypodium are thought of as arid ecological, even when they occur in pre-humid zonobiomes, because the taxon's topographic position and microclimate conditions differ significantly from the context of the greater ecological conditions within the landscape. The pre-humid zonobiomes are humid zones of regional biotic community characterized chiefly by the dominant forms of plant life and prevailing climate, such as forests or mountains. On these ecological islands the flora significantly differs from the greater surrounding zones of vegetation, where a smaller immediate area under the influence of a micro-environmental condition is defined. In larger areas of vegetation, the isolation of these plants in these "arid islands" become very conspicuous during prolonged periods without rain.

== Environmental conditions ==
The plants on outcrops, steep hills, and inselbergs are subjected to fluctuating moisture, high winds, and extremes in temperatures. This exposure occurs because, in the case or outcrops and inselbergs, all plants typically are growing in fissures that often have shallow soil and are exposed within the landscape. Pachypodium typically grows in frost-free areas with the exception of P. bispinosum and P. succulentum. The latter two species can sustain winter temperatures reaching into -10 °C).

The regions where Pachypodium biotypes exist are (a) situated between sea-level and 2000 meters and (b) are defined by the effects of temperatures. Without exception, all Pachypodium share in a preference for sunny, xeric habitats. Their exclusion from humid forests is almost entirely the case except where "inselbergs" surge above the humid, forest canopy: an example of Pachypodium response to micro-environments than larger vegetative types.

Only plants with special adaptations to extreme drought can survive exposed rocky habitats. Plants with special morphological adaptations produce offspring that can bear the intensity of these arid, xeric, exposed micro-environments. Pachypodium employs two mechanisms to adapt to these conditions:

- Spinescence: The presence of spines that collect moisture in fogs and dews and point downward so that moisture falls to the ground at the base of the plants.
- Pachycaule trunks: The use of an abnormally thickened trunk or stem of various shapes to store water in times of drought.

In some instances, the pachycaule trunks are geophytic and exist underground, as is the case for P. bispinosum and P. succulentum.

== Soils and rooting characteristics ==
On outcrops and inselbergs, Pachypodium species root in the clefts, fissures, and crevices of these rocky formations. The non-succulent roots penetrate deeply into the accumulated soil and humus in these crevices. On these geological formations, cracks in the rocks will fill quickly with water that can penetrate quite deeply. Under these conditions, there is very little evaporation so that almost all the collected water remains. Therefore, rocky substrates provide moisture in the habitat, so long as there is not appreciable runoff from the rock surfaces and there is plenty of accumulated fine soil in the cracks, which, in turn, retains water. In these conditions, Pachypodium can store enough water in their trunks to easily withstand a dry period of five or more months.

Inselbergs are quite common in Angola extending into Namibia, Zimbabwe, and western Madagascar. Inselbergs have been demonstrated to support a plant community dramatically different from their surroundings (Rapanarivo, 1999a). What little is known about seed dispersal of Pachypodium supports a scattering effect confined to sets of outcrops and inselberg landscapes. Pachypodium seed dispersal is carried out by wind, suggesting the scattering target as outcrops and inselbergs. Yet, according to Rapanarivo et al., this type of dispersal might not be the best method for the genus. The Rapanarivo study suggested, instead, that seedlings tended to emerge around "mother" plants that presumably have been well-established, rather than on distant outcrops or inselbergs. Evidence for this conclusion is found in the occurrence of P. densiflorum from Kandreho to Zazafotsy where seeds have dropped in between inselbergs and outcrops. Other examples include P. eburneum, P. windsorii, P. inopinatum, and P. decaryi where in all cases seed distribution is restricted; because the wind does not always carry seeds very far from the host plant.

The substrate plays a critical role in the creation of micro-environmental "arid islands." It has been recorded, for instance, that vegetation on rocks exposed to the sun may reach temperatures of 50 °C (122 °F) to 60 °C (140 °F), an almost lethal exposure. A black colored rocky substrate tends to be the hottest in these micro-environments. Yet, even sandstone is not immune to this thermal condition as it, too, can reach 60 °C (140 °F) by day. This factor in the micro-environmental conditions of Pachypodium causes many plants to occupy fissures on these rocks where soil and humus has collected.

Other substrates encountered by Pachypodium include: (in Madagascar) Mesozoic limestone, granite, gneiss, sandstone, quartzite, sand, schist, Tertiary calcareous, sandy loam, basalt, and sandy soil; And (in continental southern Southern Africa) quartzite, sandstone, clay, gravel, sandy soil, dolomite, granite schist, basalt, limestone, rhyolite, sand and stone, and dolerite.

A substrate of variable depth sand with laterite hosts a number of Pachypodium, such as P. rutenbergainum, P. bispinosum, P. geayi, P. lamerei, P. namaquanum, P. rosulatum, P. saundersii, and P. succulentum. Laterite is a red residual soil in tropical and subtropical regions that is leached of soluble minerals, aluminum hydroxides and silica, but still contains concentrations of iron oxides and iron hydroxides.

Sand can readily store water because of its high percolation rate. Very deep sand bodies present yet another issue: seepage. If water accumulates within deeper impermeable substrate, Pachypodium can gain a footing in the sandy soil type. Yet in a sense both shallow and deep sand substrates have water available to Pachypodium. With shallow sand substrates, Pachypodium grow on sand dunes close to the sea. Examples include P. geayi near Tuléar, Madagascar and northwest and western coastal regions for P. rutenbergianum. Often in shallow sandy areas, the water table is high so that Pachypodium send out long roots systems.

Where water is in a deep, sandy substrate, Pachypodium grow on sand over laterite red soil. Laterite is relative impermeable and thus traps water. Provided that the sand is not too deep, a water source is available to P. rosulatum and P. rutenbergianum near Antsohihy and Ankarafantsika, Madagascar. In Anjajavy Forest and other sites within the Madagascar dry deciduous forests Pachypodium thrive growing above the limestone tsingy.

== Substrate ==
Pachypodium grows in various types of substrates. In some cases, some species inhabit only one substrate. Pachypodium ambongense, P. decaryi, and P. windsorii grow exclusively on calcareous rocks. P. brevicaule and P eburneum are contained to quartzite. Other cases demonstrate that species can grow in multiple substrates. P. cactipes, P. densiflorum, and P. horombense dwell mainly on gneiss and granite. P. rutenbergianum grows in various substrates, but particularly on sand and laterite. Sand provides a substrate for P. geayi and P. rosulatum. In African, P. namaquanum can grow on three substrates: granite, quartzite, and sand. The other species likewise can be found on myriad, various substrates: limestone, granite, gneiss, sandstone, quartzite, sand, schist, tert calcareous, sandy soils, basalt, and sandy loam in Madagascar. In Africa, the substrate ranges from: quartzite, sandstone, clay, gravel, sandy soil, dolomite, granite, schist, basalt, limestone, rhyolite, and dolerite. The more adaptable the taxon is to substrate seems to be indication of how specialized the species is within its habitat in the landscape and climate.

== Soil chemistry ==
Rapanarivo et al. sampled only half of the sites in Madagascar for pH level reading. The results show no significant difference in the soil type pH Level recorded in literature.

Pachypodium have a pH range from strictly acid soils with a pH Level of 3.5 to 5 to neutral to Alkaline soils at a pH level of 7 to 8. Species growing on gneiss, granite, and quartzite adapt to acidic soils. Species preferring a pH level of 3.5 to 5 are Pachypodium brevicaule, P. cactipes, P. densiflorum, P. eburneum, and P. rosulatum. The species growing on calcareous, limestone, for instance, adapt to a basic substrate. Species growing in acid to almost basic soil that have a pH level between 4.5 and 7 are P. lamerei and P. rutenbergainum. P. meridionale grows in neutral soils. And, some species tolerate both acidic and basic soil conditions. P. sofiense can be found in either soil condition. (For species that grow in only one type of soil pH condition maintaining that "simulacrum" of acidity or alkalinity is crucial to success in cultivation.)

Within the "arid islands" or micro-environments, the difference between vegetative type, acidity and immediate acidity of the surrounding biotopes of Pachypodium seem to be a significant factor in defining habitat type.

=== Soil pH ===
Rapanarivo et al. measured the pH levels for the soil in half the sites of Pachypodium endemic to Madagascar. The pH ranges approximately from 3.5 to 7. Strictly acid soils that had a pH level of 3.5 to 5 were preferred by Pachypodium brevicaule, P. cactiples, P. densiflorum, P.eburneum, and P. rosulatum. The next level, acid to basic soils, with a pH between 4.5 and 7 were suitable for P. lamerei and P. rutenbergianum. On soils with a neutral pH level of 7, P. meridionale inhabit. P. sofiense grows on calcareous soils but also in acid soils with a pH level of 4. P. lealii grows on outcrops of granite in fairly fertile, acid soil.

== Altitude ==
In the mainland African continent, Pachypodium are known to inhabit areas from sea level for the species P. bispinosum to 1600 meters for P. lealii. In Madagascar, the range is roughly the same with P. cactiples, P. geayi, and P. rutenbergainum inhabiting at sea level to P. brevicaule reaching an altitude of 1900 meters, virtually the uppermost limit for the genus.

== Temperature ==
Average annual temperature regimes vary approximately 13 °C (55 °F) for Pachypodium brevicaule, P. densiflorum, and P. eburneum to 26.7 °C (81 °F) for the species P. decaryi, P. rutenbergainum, and P. windsorii. In continental southern Africa, the extreme temperatures range from -10 °C (14 °F) for P. succulentum locations to as much as 45 °C (113 °F) for P. bispinosum, P. lealii, and P. namaquanum. In winter time, snow remains a possibility for Africa's south-eastern Mountain Grassland. Importantly the African species of Pachypodium live in habitats with a heat regime resembling greater amplitudes than those of Madagascar. There, in the central part where most species come from, frost occasionally occurs. One station there has recorded a temperature of -2.6 °C (27 °F) whereas another has recorded a low of -6.3 °C (21 °F). In the sub–arid regions of Madagascar, the maximum temperature recorded can climb up to 40 °C (104°).

== Precipitation ==
Annually in the southern part of the African continent the rainfall varies from 75 mm (2.95 inches) for the Pachypodium namaquanum to 800 mm (31.50 inches) for P. saundersii. The west coast of South Africa and Namibia receives annually less than 100 mm (3.94 inches) but the fog coming off the Atlantic Ocean plays a significant role in maintaining plant diversity. Madagascar, on the other hand, can receive precipitation from 344 mm (13.54 inches) annually for the regional habitats of P. geayi, P. lamerei, and P. meridionale to 1985 mm (78.15 inches) for P. baronii, P rosulatum, and P. rutenbergianum. These lower values of precipitation apply to the spiny desert and Madagascar dry deciduous forests while the higher rainfall regimes apply to the (eastern) lowland rainforests. There is little commonality in precipitation regimes for Pachypodium. Therefore, a precipitation regime for a species of Pachypodium depends upon a habitat's location relative to the influences of the Atlantic and India Oceans and the various mountain ranges and open expanses of southern continental Africa and the island of Madagascar. One common thread holds true for the genus: all Pachypodium are succulent plants making use of their trunks and their spines to inhabit dry, xeric climates.

== Number of dry months ==
Pachypodium represent the dry flora of continental Africa and Madagascar. The genus grows in areas where there are significant periods of dry months. This dry period can vary from 5 months for Pachypodium brevicaule to 10 or more months for P. cactipes, P. geayi, P. lamerei, and P. meridionale. It would seem likely that the Atlantic and India Oceans pay a big role in the creation of weather conducive to rainfall. The effect of mountains might also affect the localized conditions of the climate for Pachypodium.

== Evolution of Pachypodium ==
There are no fossil records of Pachypodium, a fact that does exclude analysis to determine common ancestry and current relationships between taxa. Yet certain conclusions can be drawn from the geology of the landscape itself to the past natural history of Pachypodium. Geological history demonstrates that Pachypodium and other genera like Aloe, Euphorbia, Cissus, Sesamothamnus, Kalanchoe, and Adansonia existed before the separation of Madagascar from continental Southern Africa. Pachypodium and these other genera, for instance, are represented on both Madagascar and the mainland, suggesting that their populations were once continuous within the landscape before the Gondwanaland continental separation about 66 million years ago in the Cretaceous period.

The diversity of Pachypodium in Madagascar, as noted, is the result of accelerated evolution that occurs in xeric climates and dry landscapes. Three factors contribute to the acceleration:

- In dry climates, the diversity of geology and topology is thought to have a greater effect upon plants than in areas with high rainfall.
- The broken geological formations of locally xeric landscapes tend to break up populations into smaller groups so that each group can initially interbreed but with time new genotypes, taxa, or species develop.
- Taxa develop specialized xeromorphoric structures at some architectural level for which the alliance "succulents" are a good example; and where dew and fog dripping spines are another example at the level of an organ.

Therefore, the exceptional micro-endemism (native or confined to a certain habitat) occur in Madagascar as a result of isolation of flora in very different climates, landscapes, or environments at an exceptionally small scale. Pachypodium have proven to be no different. The scale is so small that it is thought that, in some instances, the resolution of speciation of this flora is limited to just a single outcrop of granite, for instance. Efforts at maintaining possible habitats must be weighed with the potential for the economic development of the Malagasy people. Conservation may become a high priority, dependent upon an accurate catalogue of species and equally an understanding of the potential habitats of Pachypodium yet to be discovered in Madagascar.

== See also ==
- Madagascar dry deciduous forests
