= Greenbelt Alliance =

Environmental conservation in the USA

- Founded: 1958; 68 years ago
- Founder: Dorothy Erskine
- Type: Non-profit 501(c)(3)
- Purpose: Environmental conservation and climate resilience advocacy
- Headquarters: San Francisco Bay Area
- Location: San Francisco, California, USA
- Region served: San Francisco Bay Area
- Key people: Amanda Brown-Stevens, Executive Director
- Website: www.greenbelt.org
- Formerly called: People for Open Space

Greenbelt Alliance is an environmental non-profit organization focused on land conservation and urban planning in the San Francisco Bay Area.

== History ==
Greenbelt Alliance was founded in 1958 as an organization called Citizens for Regional Recreation and Parks. An early campaign involved opposing proposals to fill portions of the San Francisco Bay for development. In 1969, the organization was renamed People for Open Space, expanding its focus to include ranch lands, agricultural lands, and wildlife preserves. In the 1970s, People for Open Space campaigned for the creation of the Mid-Peninsula Regional Open Space District (1972) and the protection of Suisun Marsh (1974). The organization also campaigned for a regional government system for the Bay Area, though the corresponding state legislation failed by a single vote. In 1976, People for Open Space adopted a policy goal of establishing a permanent regional greenbelt, and in 1984 it formed the Greenbelt Congress to manage its grassroots advocacy.

In 1987, Greenbelt Congress and People for Open Space merged to become Greenbelt Alliance, and combined their operations into grassroots advocacy and regional policy research. Greenbelt Alliance expanded outside San Francisco with a field office in the South Bay in 1988. In 1995, East Bay and Sonoma-Marin field offices opened, and in 2001, a Solano-Napa office opened to cover the Interstate 80 corridor between San Francisco and Sacramento.

In the 1990s and 2000s, Greenbelt Alliance opposed several housing and commercial development proposals while advocating for the designation of Pleasanton Ridge (1993), Bear Creek Redwoods (1999), and Cowell Ranch/John Marsh SHP (2002) as state parks or open space preserves. The group lobbied for the establishment of the Santa Clara Valley Open Space Authority in 1994, and opposed the proposed Mid-State Toll Road freeway, a project canceled in 1995.

== See also ==
- Climate resilience
- Greenbelt
- Land use
- Mixed-use development
- New Urbanism
- Transit-oriented development
- Urban planning
- Urban sprawl
- Walkability
