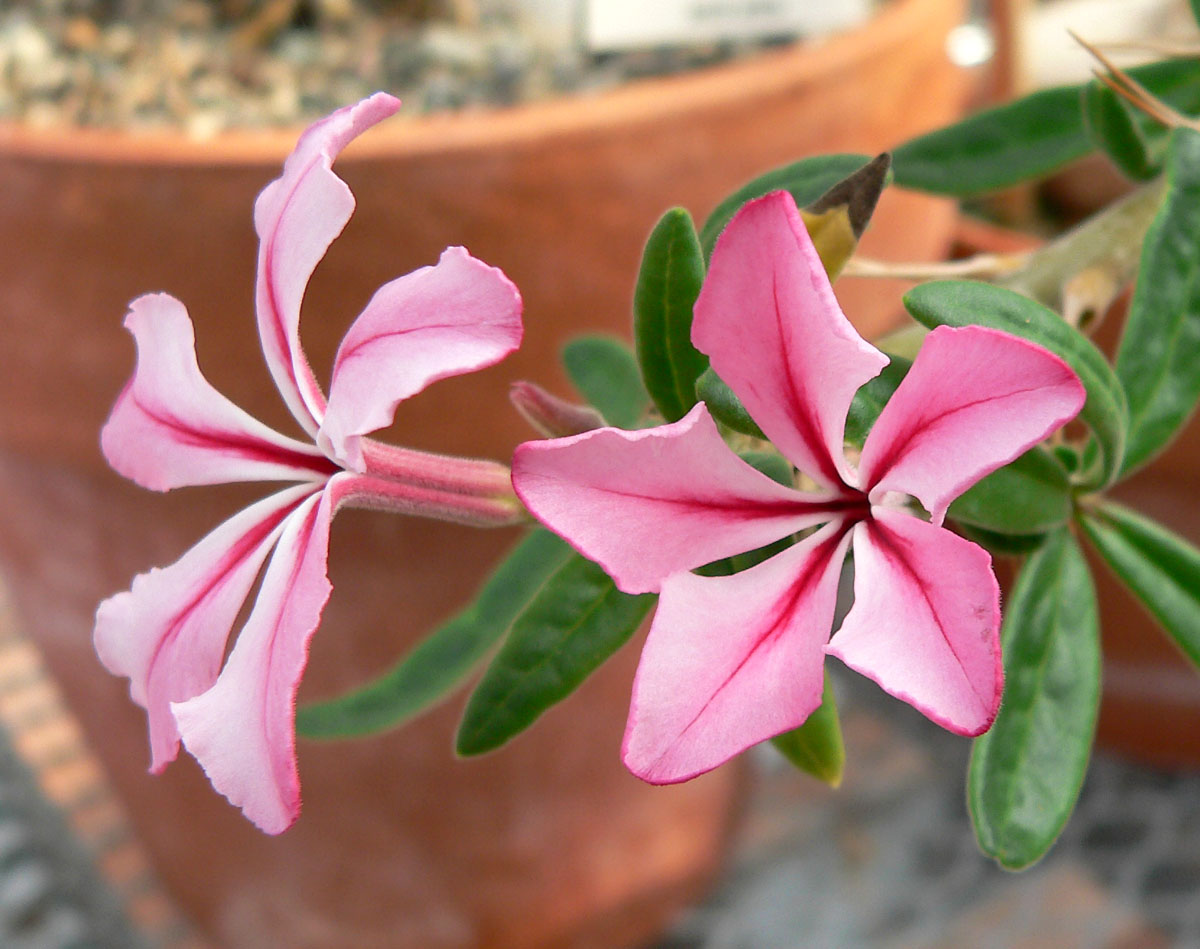

Scientific classification
- Kingdom: Plantae
- Clade: Embryophytes
- Clade: Tracheophytes
- Clade: Spermatophytes
- Clade: Angiosperms
- Clade: Eudicots
- Clade: Asterids
- Order: Gentianales
- Family: Apocynaceae
- Genus: Pachypodium
- Species: P. succulentum

Binomial name
- Pachypodium succulentum (L.f.) Sweet
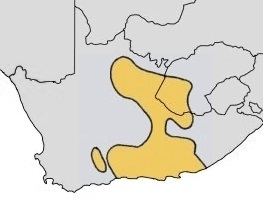
- combined native range of P. succulentum and P. bispinosum

Synonyms
- Barleria rigida Spreng. ex Schltdl., nom. nud.; Belonites succulentus (L.f.) E.Mey.; Echites succulentus L.f. (1782) (basionym); Echites tuberosus Haw. ex Steud.; Pachypodium griquense L.Bolus; Pachypodium jasminiflorum L.Bolus; Pachypodium tomentosum G.Don; Pachypodium tuberosum Lindl., nom. superfl.; Pachypodium tuberosum var. loddigesii A.DC.

= Pachypodium succulentum =

Species of plant

Pachypodium succulentum is a member of the family Apocynaceae native to the Cape Provinces and the Free State province of South Africa.

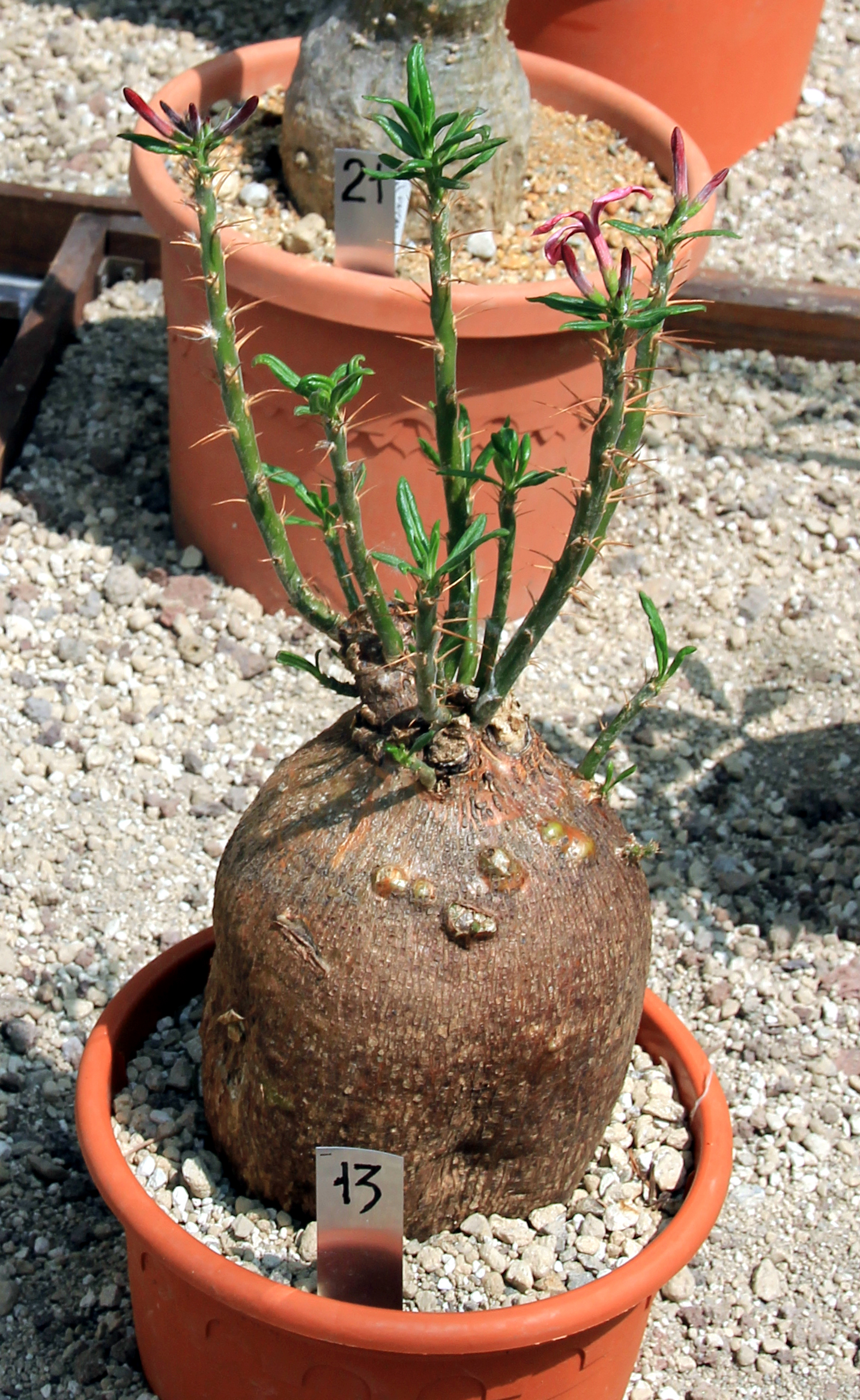
Pachypodium succulentum

== Description ==
True to its name, P. succulentum is characterised by its sturdy water-holding swallowed-stem base. Thin, near-straight shoots grow from this base to a height of around 1.6 feet and are covered in 0.8 inch thorns that come in pairs. Leaves are found on the upper parts of the shoots and are narrow, dark green, lanceolate and feature venation. Flowers are pink or white.
