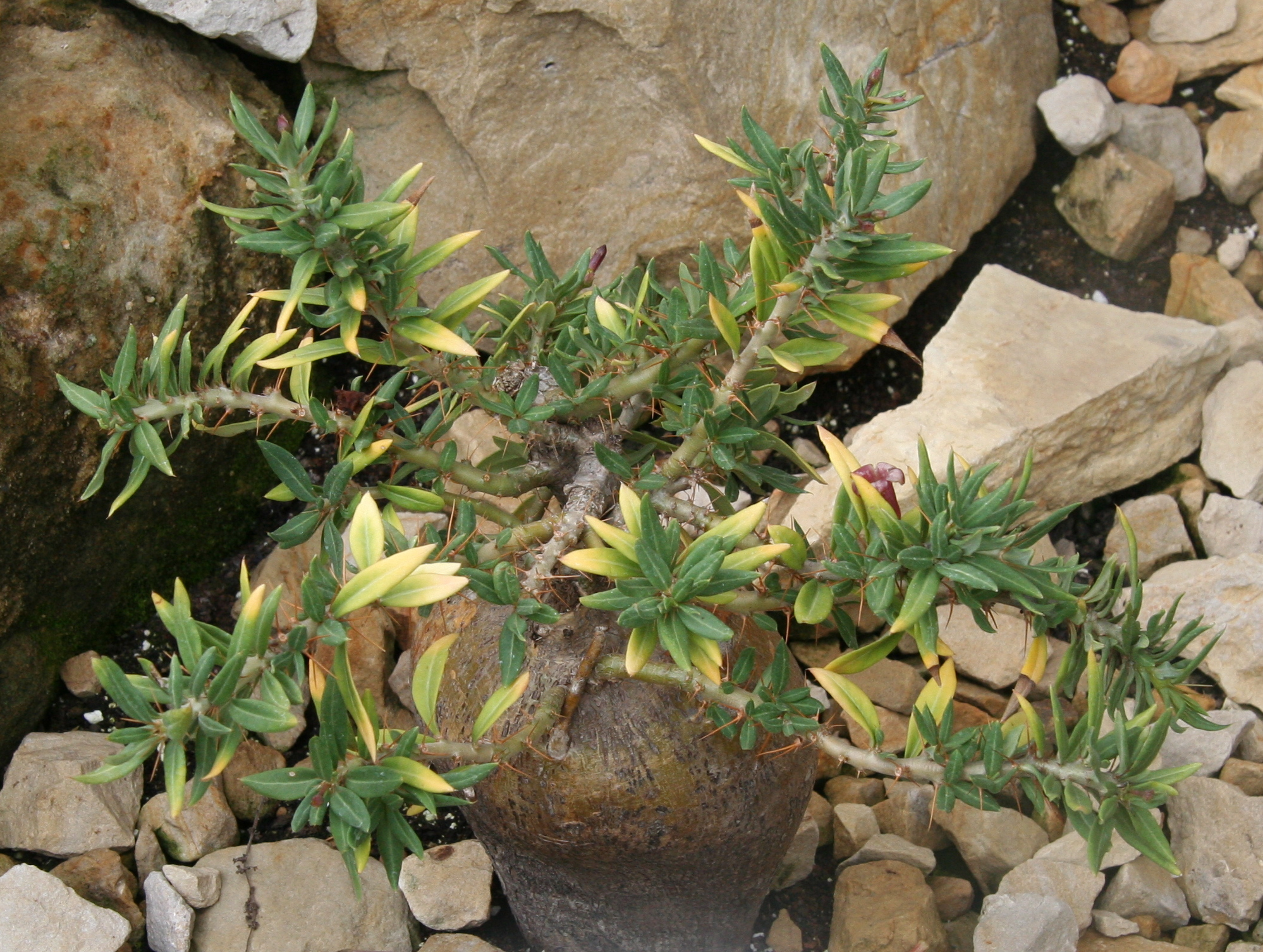

Scientific classification
- Kingdom: Plantae
- Clade: Embryophytes
- Clade: Tracheophytes
- Clade: Spermatophytes
- Clade: Angiosperms
- Clade: Eudicots
- Clade: Asterids
- Order: Gentianales
- Family: Apocynaceae
- Genus: Pachypodium
- Species: P. bispinosum

Binomial name
- Pachypodium bispinosum (L.f.) A.DC.
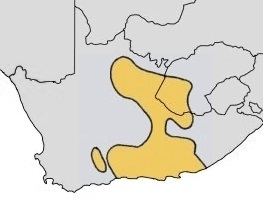
- combined native range of P. bispinosum and P. succulentum

Synonyms
- Belonites bispinosus (L.f.) E.Mey; Echites bispinosus L.f. Pachypodium glabrum G.Don

= Pachypodium bispinosum =

Species of shrub

Pachypodium bispinosum is a succulent sub-shrub in the family Apocynaceae.

== Description ==
Pachypodium bispinosum has a swollen, tuberous stem, or caudex, up to 0.6 m tall, which is partially buried beneath the soil. Thick, bonsai-like branches sprout from the top of the stem, and are lined with paired, straight spines 10–20 mm long, somewhat shorter than other Pachypodium species. The narrow leaves are scattered or in tufts along the branches. From August to December, the plant bears a few purple to pink flowers in clusters at the tips of the branches. These flowers are bell-shaped are about 15–20 mm in diameter. P. bispinosum is the most floriferous species in cultivation. The leaves of this species are less hairy than others in its genus, with margins curling down more distinctly.

== Distribution ==
The species is almost entirely confined to the Eastern Cape province of South Africa. In its native range, it can be found in stony places, growing amongst the dry succulent scrub. When not in flower, it is indistinguishable from Pachypodium succulentum, a species with which it overlaps in its natural range.
