= Catharanthus scitulus =

Scientific classification
- Kingdom: Plantae
- Clade: Tracheophytes
- Clade: Angiosperms
- Clade: Eudicots
- Clade: Asterids
- Order: Gentianales
- Family: Apocynaceae
- Genus: Catharanthus
- Species: C. scitulus

Binomial name
- Catharanthus scitulus (Pichon) Pichon

Synonyms
- Lochnera scitula Pichon

Species of plant

Catharanthus scitulus is a species of flowering plant in the family Apocynaceae. It is endemic to Madagascar, where it is found in the sub-arid south in low-lying, sandy soil. Similar to C. lanceus, the plant branches out more than the other species. Its stems spread, with pseudo-dichotomous branching, coming together to form a rosette at each node. The corolla is pink or violet at the lobes.
