= Catharanthus longifolius =

Scientific classification
- Kingdom: Plantae
- Clade: Tracheophytes
- Clade: Angiosperms
- Clade: Eudicots
- Clade: Asterids
- Order: Gentianales
- Family: Apocynaceae
- Genus: Catharanthus
- Species: C. longifolius

Binomial name
- Catharanthus longifolius (Pichon) Pichon

Species of plant

Catharanthus longifolius is a species of flowering plant in the dogbane family, Apocynaceae. It is endemic to Madagascar.

Catharanthus longifolius is usually found in the mountainous areas in the southeast and northern areas of Madagascar. The specific epithet longifolius refers to its leaf shape, which is lanceolate as it grows. The plant is relatively small, with leaves being less than 9 mm wide. The corolla is pink with a yellow eye, and the lobes are white closest to the base.

C. longifolius contains similar alkaloids to C. roseus, such as cathafoline, similar in structure to serpentine and vindolinine.
