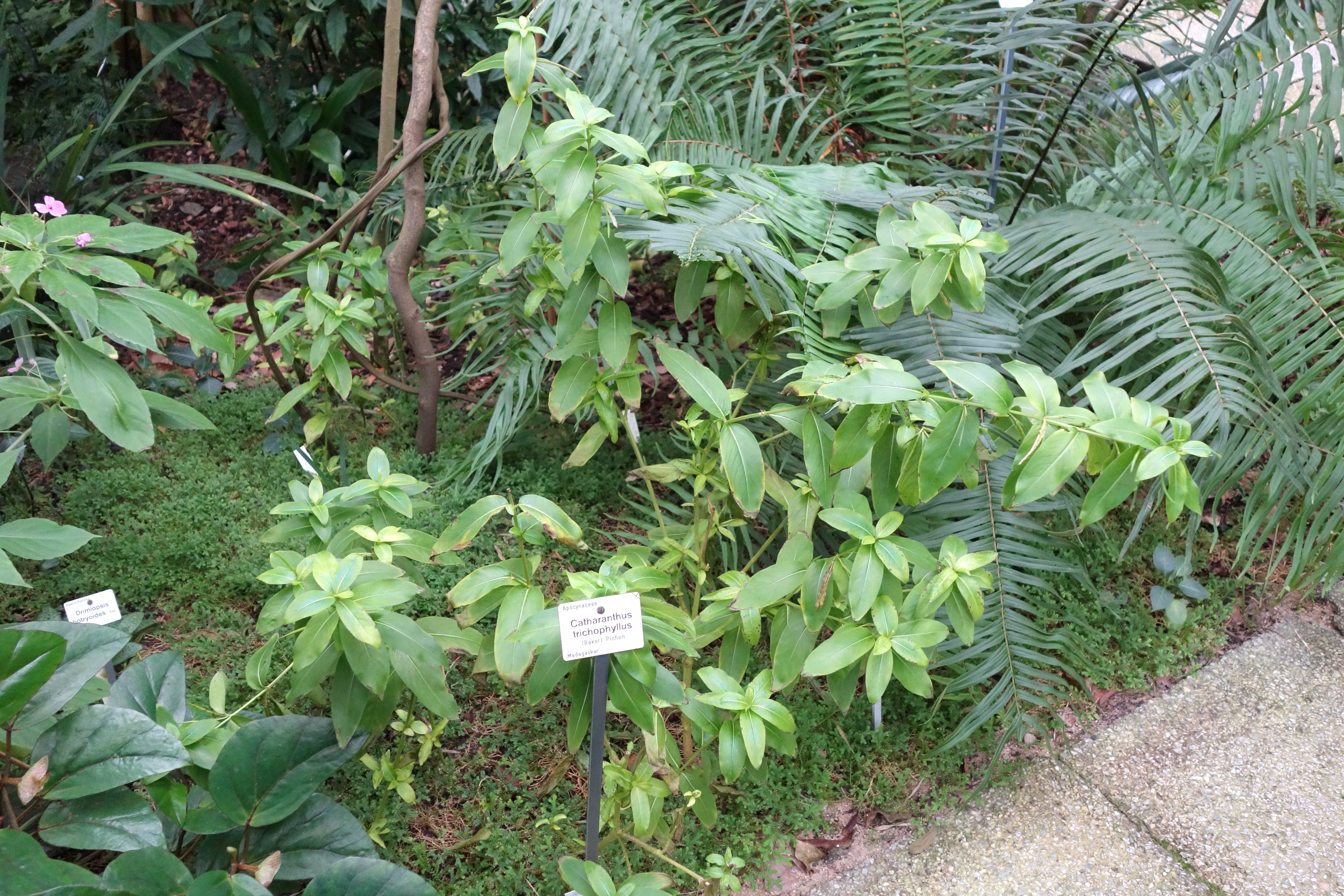

Scientific classification
- Kingdom: Plantae
- Clade: Tracheophytes
- Clade: Angiosperms
- Clade: Eudicots
- Clade: Asterids
- Order: Gentianales
- Family: Apocynaceae
- Genus: Catharanthus
- Species: C. trichophyllus

Binomial name
- Catharanthus trichophyllus (Baker) Pichon

Synonyms
- Lochnera trichophylla (Baker) Pichon; Vinca trichophylla Baker

= Catharanthus trichophyllus =

Species of flowering plant

Catharanthus trichophyllus is a species of flowering plant in the family Apocynaceae. It is endemic to Madagascar, where it is most common in northern regions.

== Description ==
This is a perennial herb growing up to one meter tall. It has an unpleasant scent. It contains a white latex. The stems and branches are squared, winged, and reddish or purplish in color. The oppositely arranged leaves have hairy, pointed oval blades up to 8.5 centimeters long. They are each accompanied by several stipules. Flowers occur singly or in pairs in the leaf axils. The calyx is up to a centimeter long and has five long, narrow lobes. The corolla has a tubular throat over 2 centimeters long opening into five lobes each up to 1.8 centimeters long. The flowers may be white, pink, red, or purple, with yellowish centers. The fruit is a pair of greenish or purplish follicles up to 7 centimeters long. Each contains 10 to 20 seeds.

== Taxonomy ==
The species epithet trichophyllus is Latin for 'hairy leaves'.

== Ecology ==
The plant grows in humid and dry climates in many habitat types, including forest edges and openings, riverbanks, and disturbed areas such as roadsides.

== Uses ==
The plant is used in traditional medicine to treat a variety of conditions, including sexually transmitted diseases, impotency, back pain, toothache, fever, dysentery, bleeding, and liver diseases. It is used as a stimulant, an aphrodisiac, and an appetite suppressant.

== Chemistry ==
The plant is a congeneric of the Madagascar periwinkle (C. roseus), the original main source of vinca alkaloids, also known as catharanthus alkaloids, which are still in use today as anticancer drugs. C. trichophyllus contains lower concentrations of such alkaloids. The two species can be hybridized to increase the concentration.
