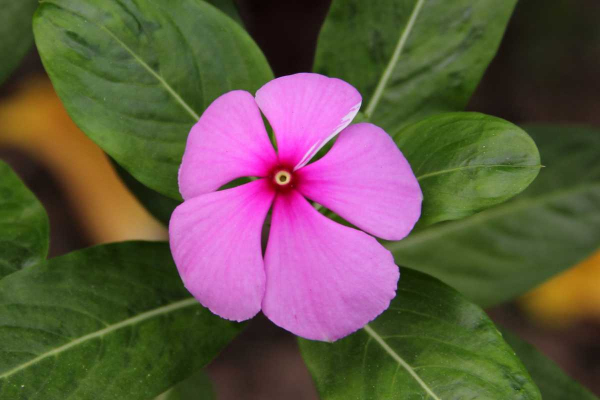
- Catharanthus roseus

Scientific classification
- Kingdom: Plantae
- Clade: Embryophytes
- Clade: Tracheophytes
- Clade: Spermatophytes
- Clade: Angiosperms
- Clade: Eudicots
- Clade: Asterids
- Order: Gentianales
- Family: Apocynaceae
- Subfamily: Rauvolfioideae
- Tribe: Vinceae
- Subtribe: Catharanthinae
- Genus: Catharanthus; G.Don

= Catharanthus =

Genus of flowering plants

Catharanthus is a genus of flowering plants in the family Apocynaceae. Like the genus Vinca, they are known commonly as periwinkles. It is a perennial herb and a subshrub endemic to Madagascar, with the exception of Catharanthus pusillus (commonly known as the tiny periwinkle), which is found in India and Sri Lanka. The most widely known species is Catharanthus roseus due to its usage in traditional and modern medicine, specifically as a source of cancer-treating alkaloid chemicals.

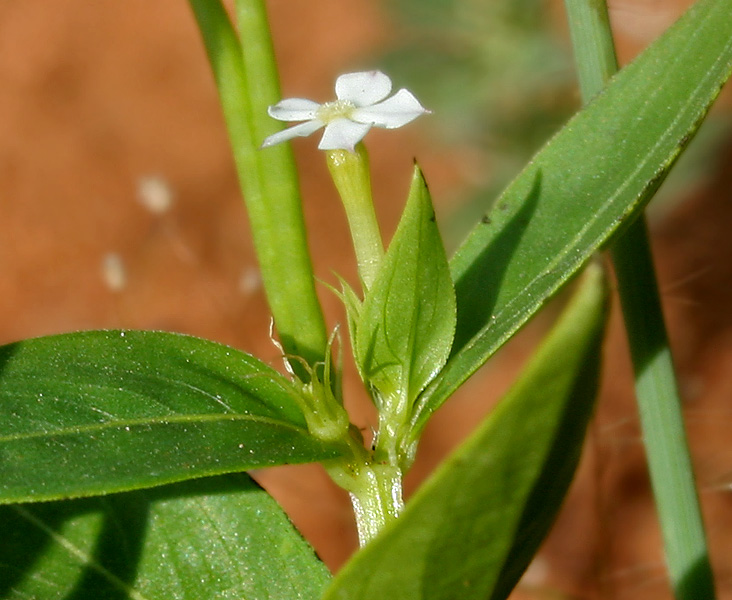
Catharanthus pusillus

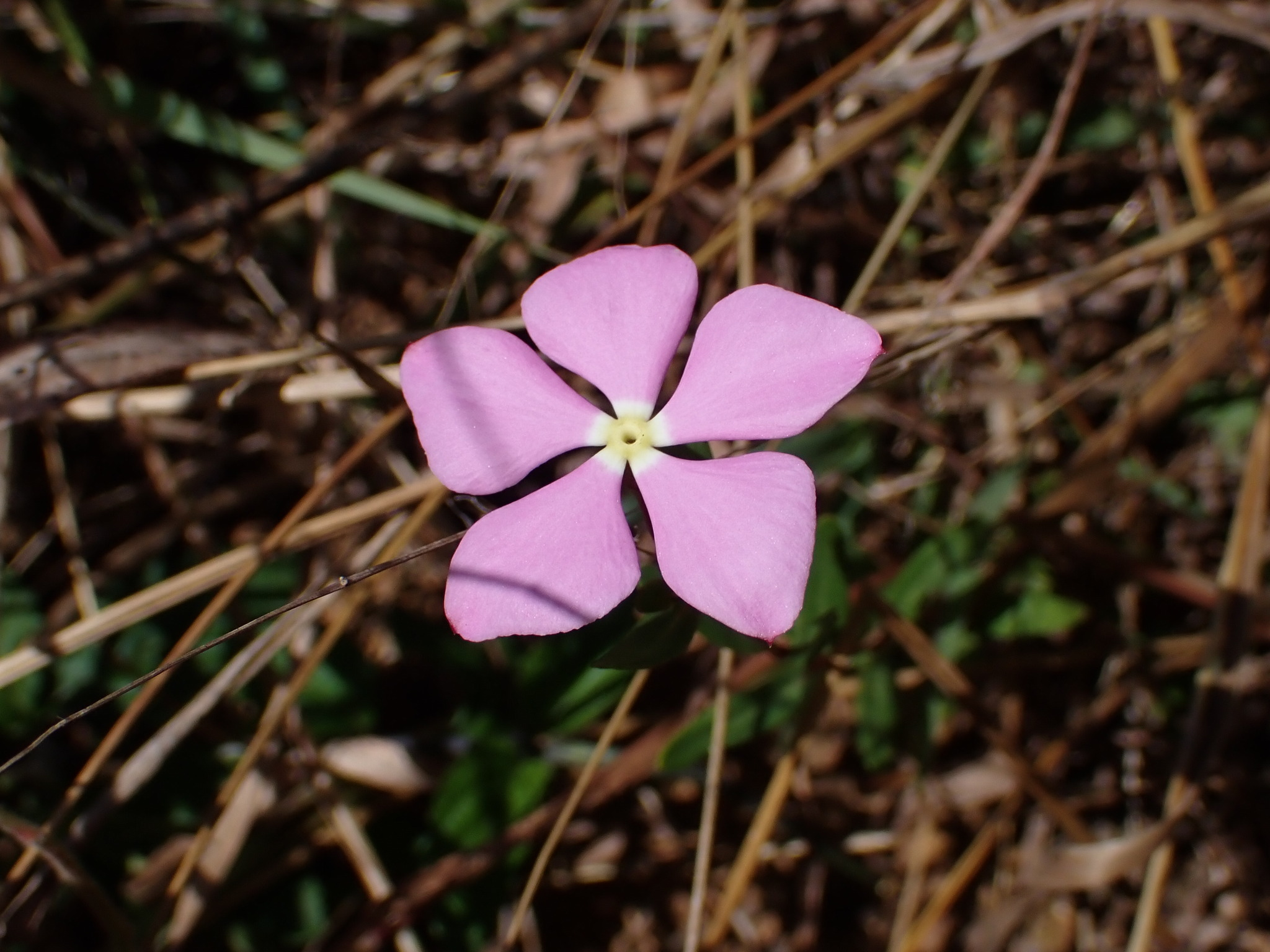
Catharanthus lanceus

== Description ==
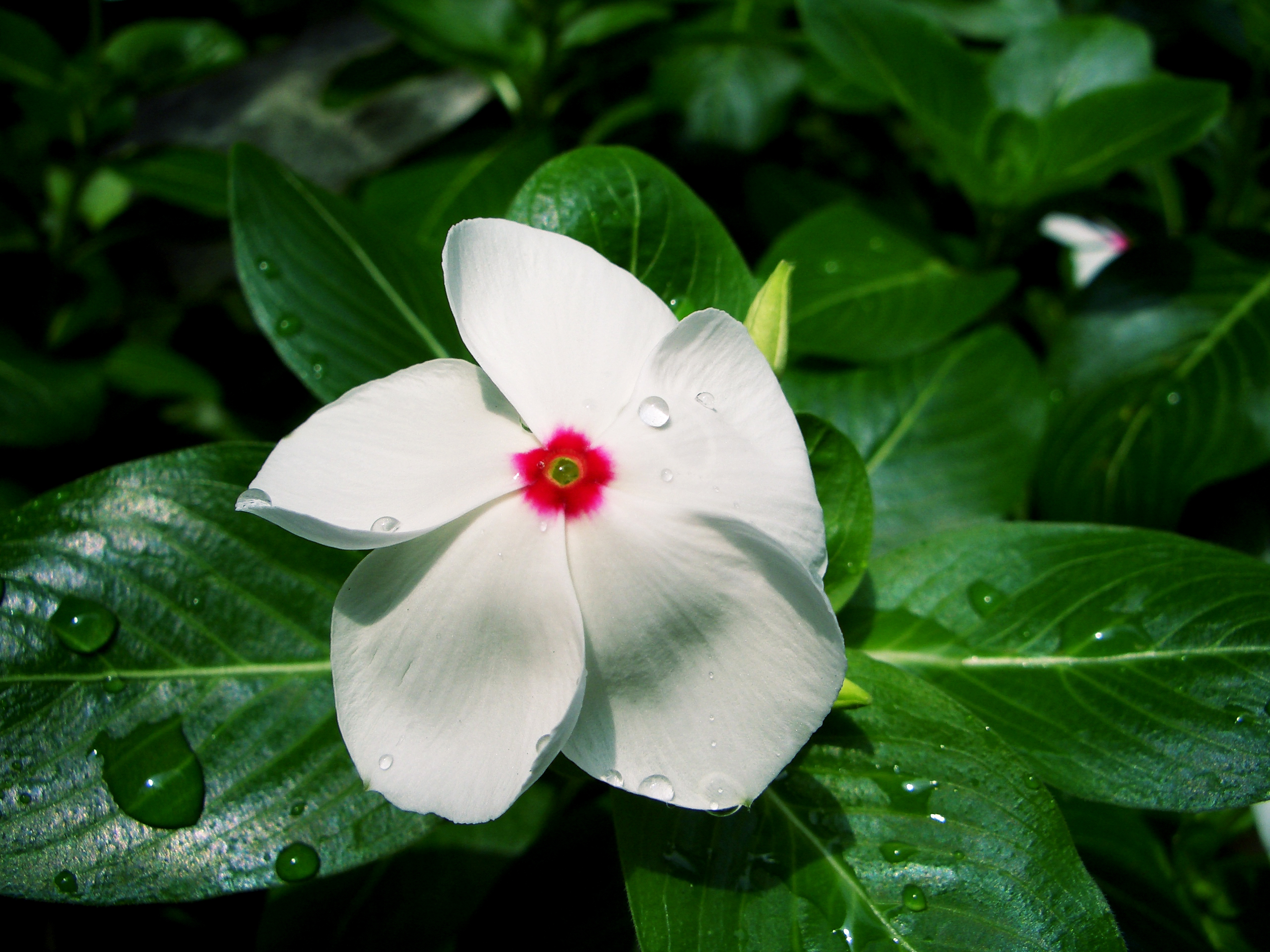
White Catharanthus roseus

Plants of Catharanthus are perennial herbs that are subshrubby, often with prostrate or erect stems that branch from the base of the plant. The genus was first described in 1837 by George Don. He characterized the plants by the morphological features of simple, opposite, or almost oppositely arranged leaves. The flowers are usually solitary in the leaf axils. Each has a calyx with five long, narrow lobes and a corolla with a tubular throat and five lobes that can be twisted. Fruits are commonly made up of two divergent follicles that hold many seeds. The corolla varies in color shades of pink, purple, and white.

It has also been mentioned that the genus is closely associated with the genus Amsonia, but possesses distinct differences such as Catharanthus grows mostly solitary or in pairs, while Amsonia grows in groups.

== Taxonomy ==
The genus has undergone several taxonomic revisions since it was classified initially. The genus was originally described by Carl Linnaeus in 1753 with the species Vinca rosea (known now as Catharanthus roseus). Along with V. rosea, he distinguished two other species, Vinca major and Vinca minor. In 1828, Heinrich Gustav Reichenbach proposed a separation of V. rosea with the new name of Lochnera. However, the distinction and descriptions he intended to back up his proposal were not widely accepted in the world of botany and taxonomy. In 1838, it became an accepted proposition and name as Stephen Endlicher made a clear and valid distinction, which included how Catharanthus fruits are filiform while Vinca fruits are narrowly obconical, Catharanthus is a perennial (a plant living longer than two years) herb or undershrub erect or procumbent, while Vinca is a perennial herb ascending. Around the same time, George Don had first described his findings and formally proposed a new genus, Catharanthus. This was based on differences in morphological characteristics of other species in the Vinca genus and V. rosea. In 1844, Augustin Pyramus de Candolle further revised the classification of the genus, dividing Vinca into three sections: Lochnera, containing C. roseus, C. coriaceous, C. lanceus, C. longifolius, C. trichophyllus, and C. ovalis. C. pusillus was distinguished into a different section. After these taxonomic revisions and contributions occurred, the name Catharanthus was acknowledged more. In 1949, Pierre Pichon added C. scitulus to the Lochnera section and renamed it Androyella. More recently, in 2015, the genus was expanded further with the discovery of the species Catharanthus makayensis by Lucile Allorge, Peter B. Phillips on, and Richardson Razakamalala. C. roseus and C. trichophyllus are also known as sadabahar (in Hindi) and chang chung hua (in Chinese). The name Catharanthus comes from the Greek for "pure flower".

=== Species ===
As of November 2023, Plants of the World Online accepted the following species:

- Catharanthus coriaceus Markgr. – Madagascar
- Catharanthus lanceus (Bojer ex A.DC.) Pichon – Madagascar
- Catharanthus longifolius (Pichon) Pichon – Madagascar
- Catharanthus makayensis L.Allorge, Phillipson & Razakamal. – Madagascar
- Catharanthus ovalis Markgr. – Madagascar
- Catharanthus pusillus (Murray) G.Don – India, Sri Lanka, Western Himalayas
- Catharanthus roseus (L.) G.Don – Madagascar, widely naturalized (Madagascar periwinkle, old-maid, rosy periwinkle, pink periwinkle)
- Catharanthus scitulus (Pichon) Pichon – Madagascar
- Catharanthus trichophyllus (Baker) Pichon – Madagascar

== Distribution and habitat ==
Most of the known species of Catharanthus are endemic to Madagascar, though one, C. roseus, is widely naturalized around the world. One species, C. pusillus, is native to India and Sri Lanka. The plant, as it has been observed up to this point, can inhabit up to 2000 m elevation, particularly those seen in the central plateau mountains.

== Uses ==
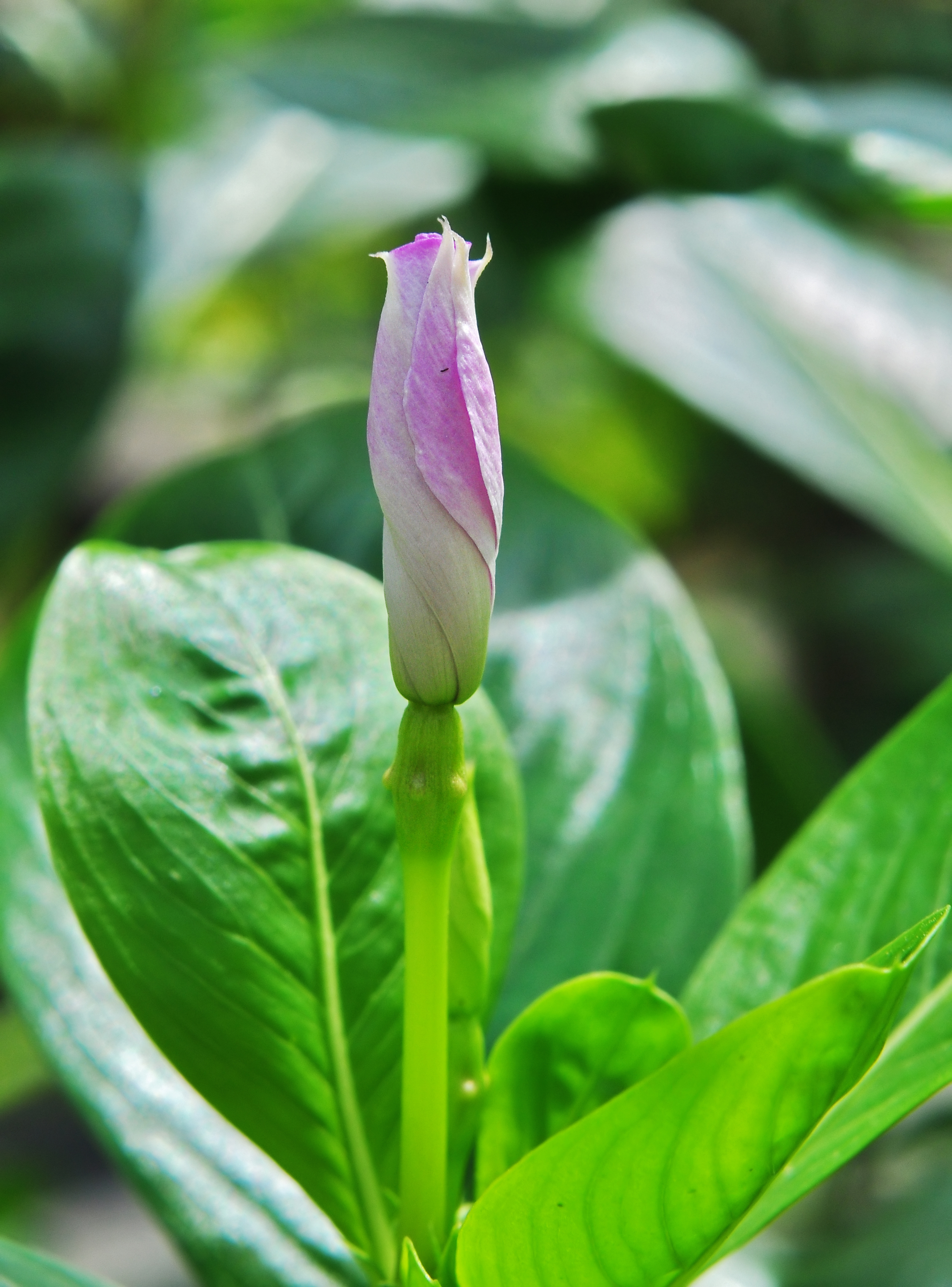

In the 1950s, Catharanthus roseus, known formerly as Vinca rosea, was heavily researched when India, and various countries in Africa and the Caribbean used it for its medicinal properties. It is a main source of vinca alkaloids, now sometimes called catharanthus alkaloids. The plant produces about 130 of these compounds, including vinblastine and vincristine, two drugs used to treat cancer. These alkaloids are typically used to treat cancer, such as leukemia, lymphoma, and testicular cancer. A less commonly known alkaloid that the species holds is ajmalicine (found in the root), used to treat hypertension (high blood pressure) (hyp and diabetes. Traditionally, the medicinal properties of the plant extend to treating hyperglycemia, asthma, hypertension, malaria, various infections, and many more. The species was also briefly referenced when trying to find COVID-19 treatment through the extraction and usage of jasmonic acid, methylester, Penciclovir, and Putamonoxin B and D. Other traditional medicine uses the plant for leaf juice application on bee and wasp stings in India, eye wash for infants with flower extract in Cuba and Jamaica, treat insomnia in Malaysia, ease sore throats and laryngitis in America.

Many of the species, primarily Catharanthus roseus, are also cultivated as an ornamental plant in gardens. Several cultivars have been bred to produce flowers in many shades of pink, red, lilac, and white, or in light shades with dark throats.

== Gallery ==
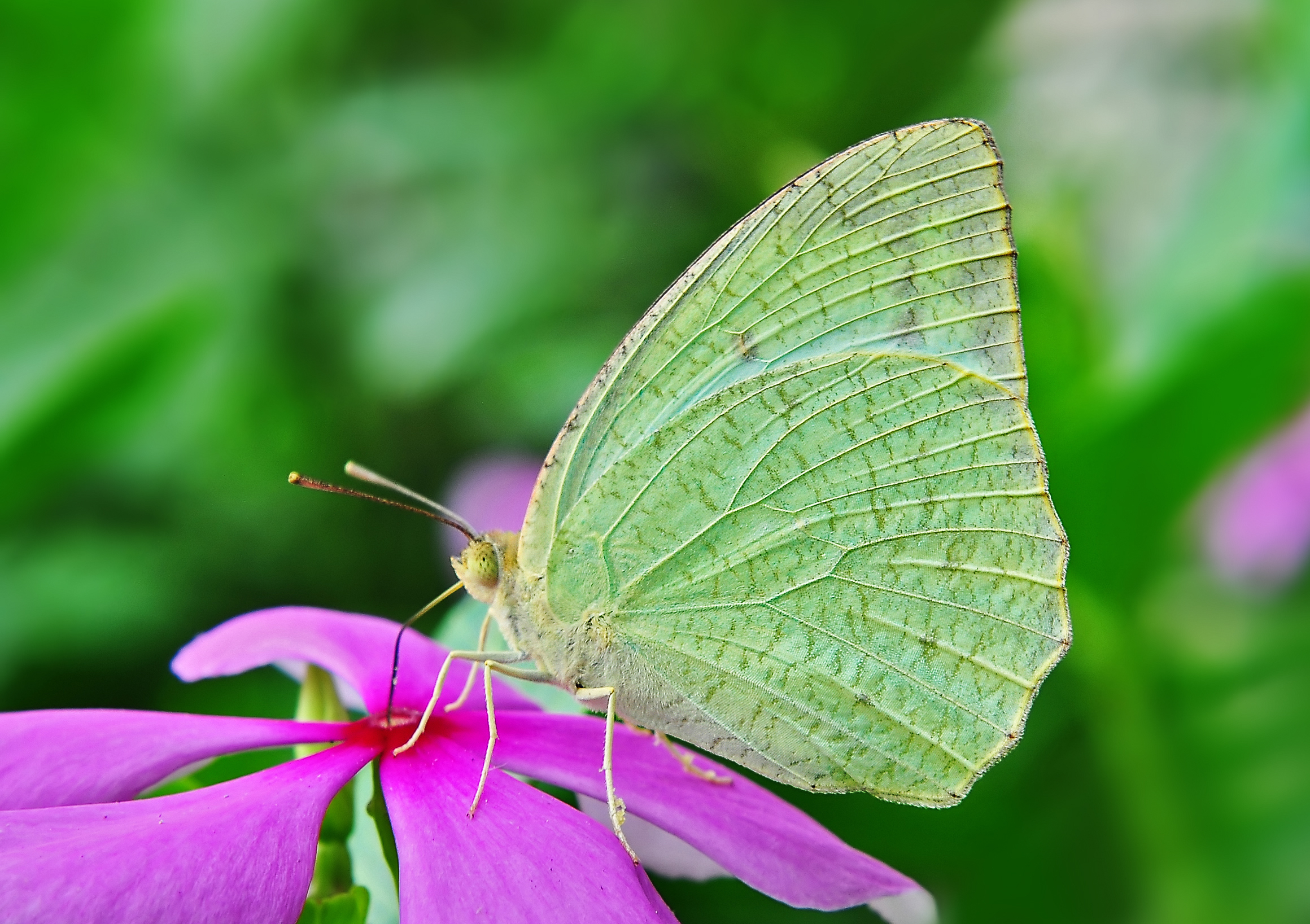
Catopsilia pyranthe, a butterfly sitting on Catharanthus roseus

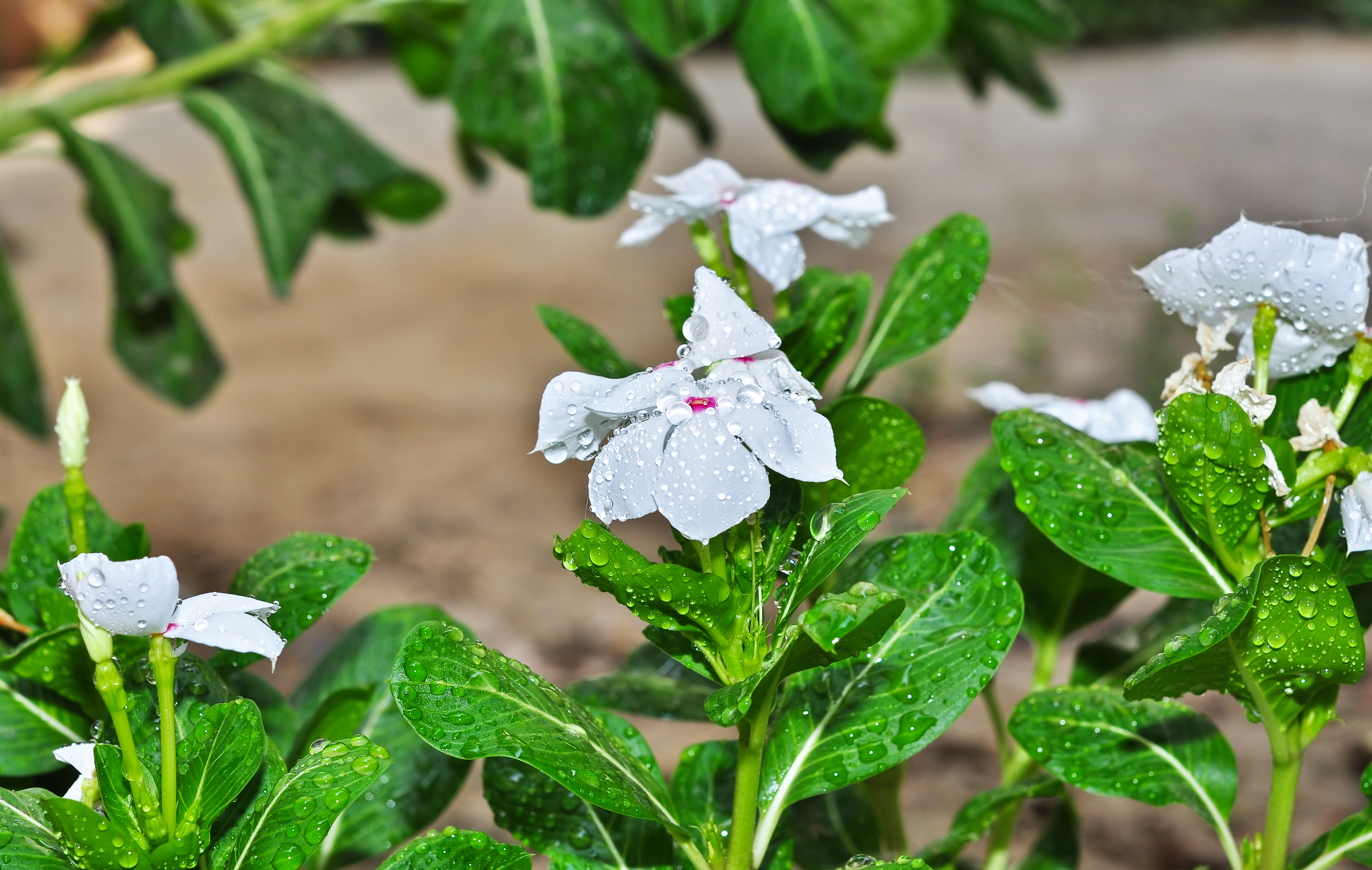
Whitish-pink form of Catharanthus roseus

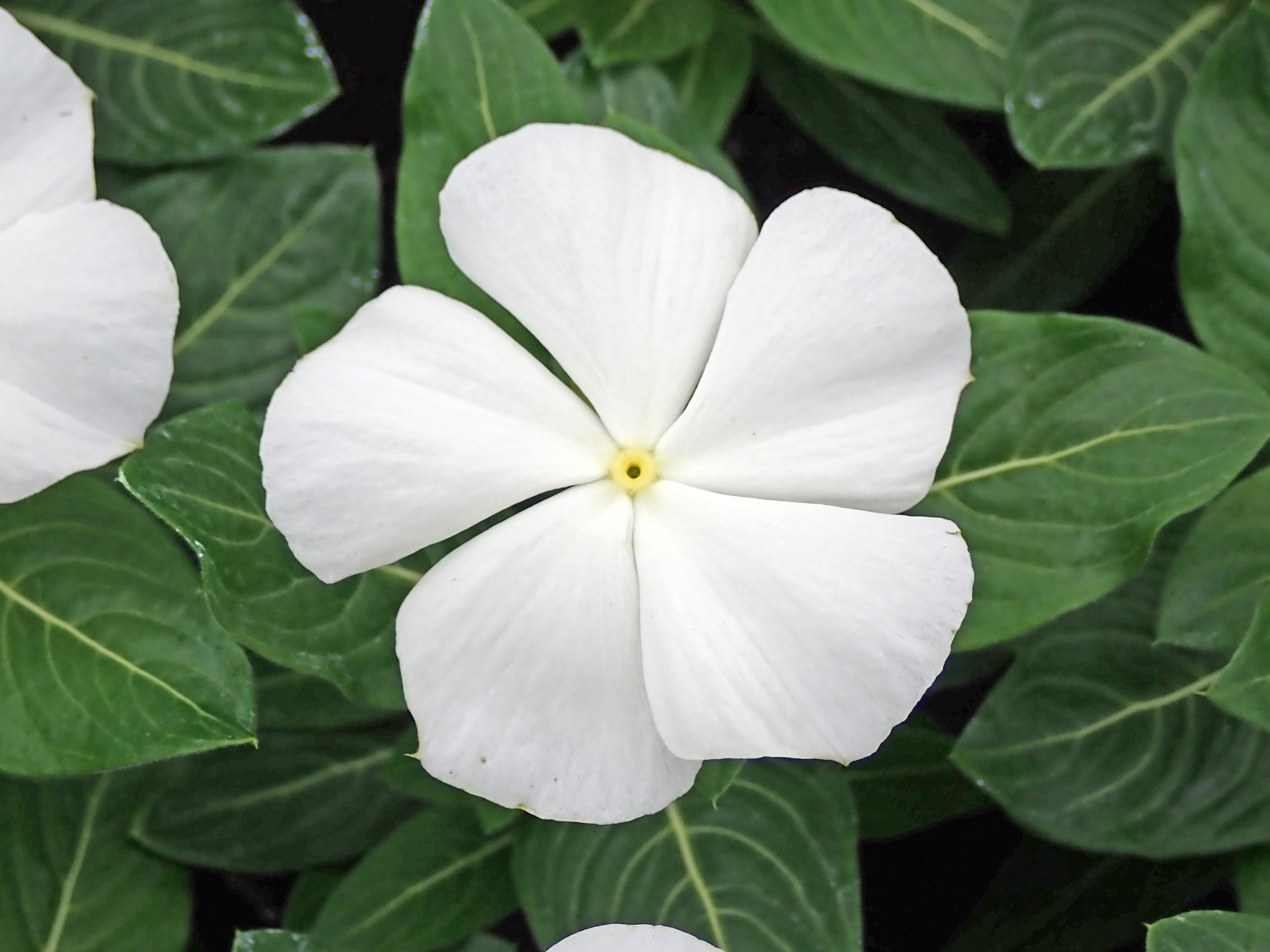
White form of Catharanthus roseus

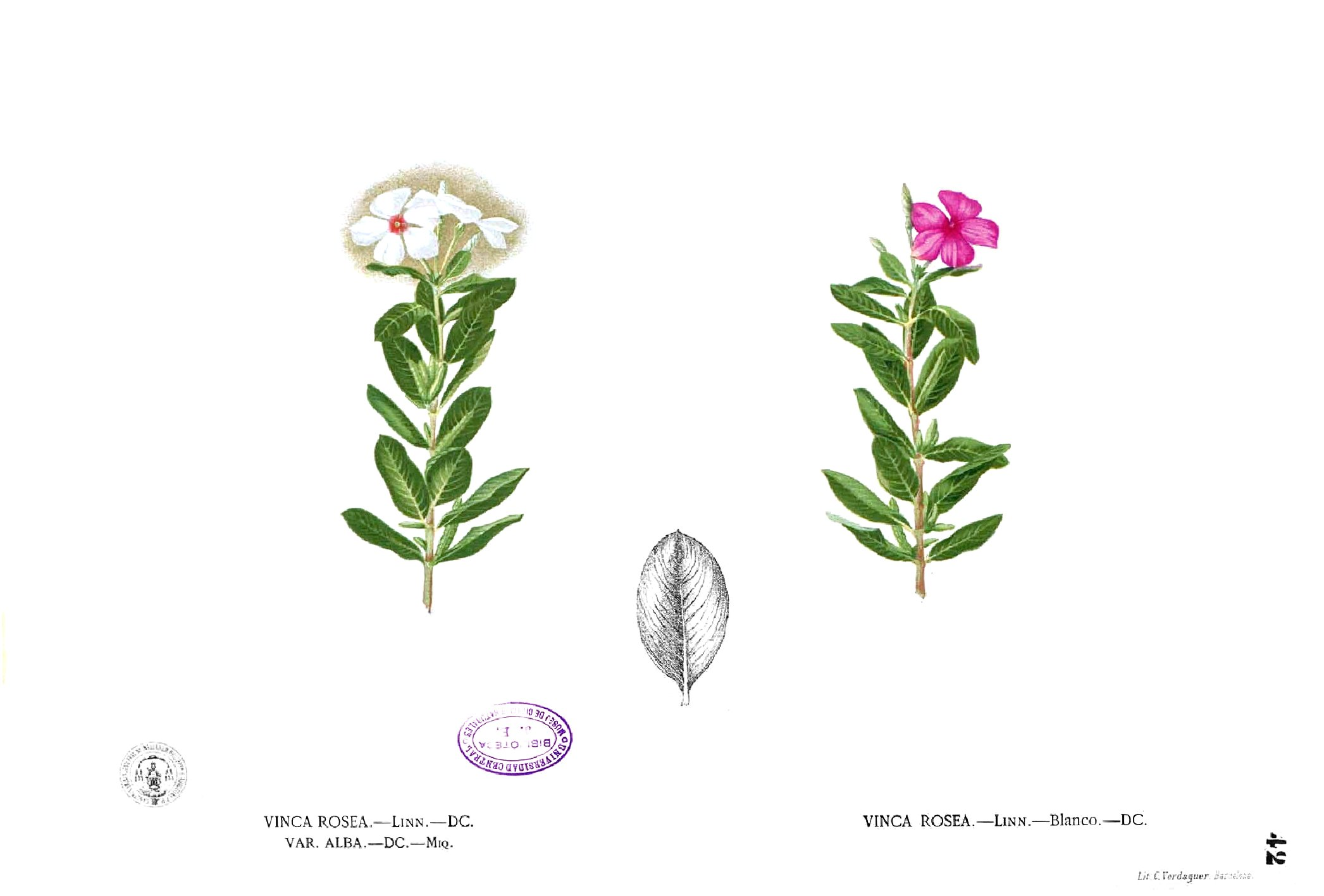
Two morphs of Catharanthus roseus and a leaf

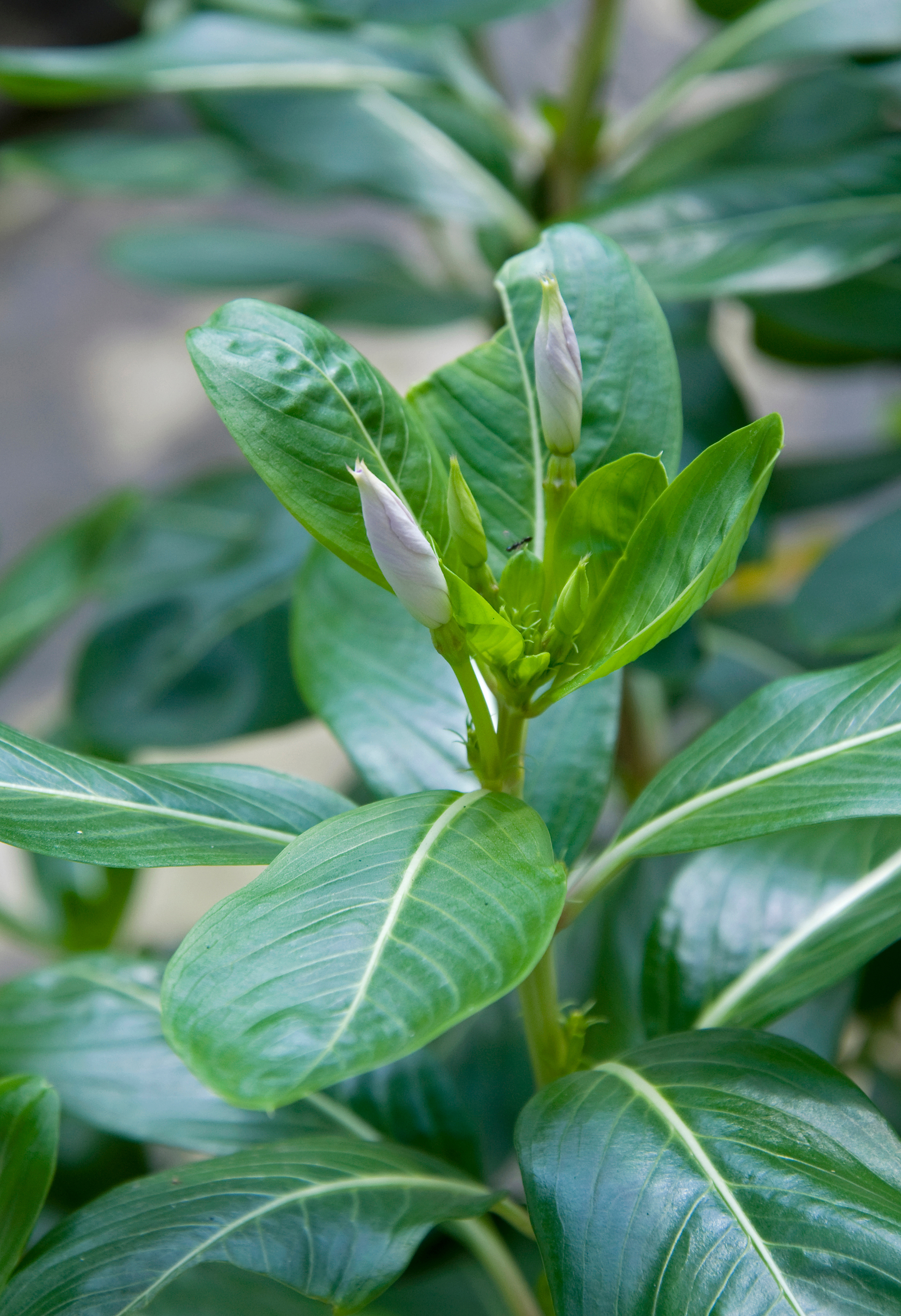
Catharanthus roseus buds

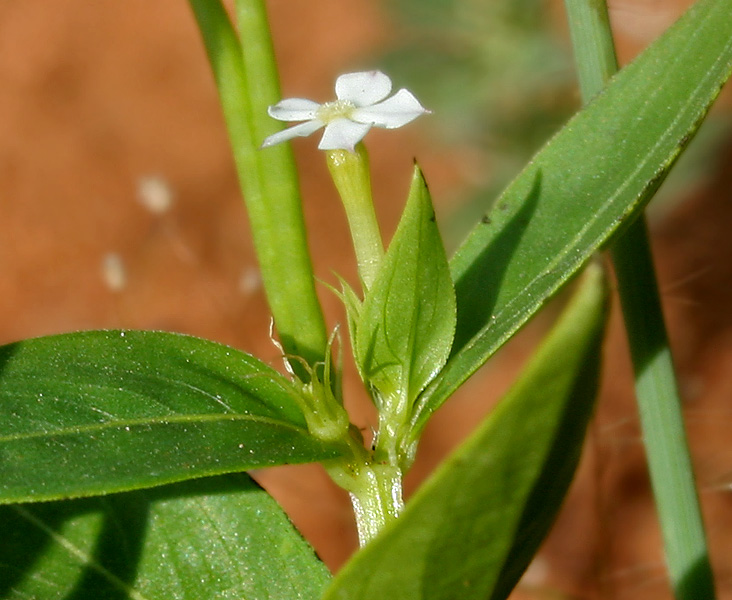
Catharanthus pusillus (Tiny periwinkle)

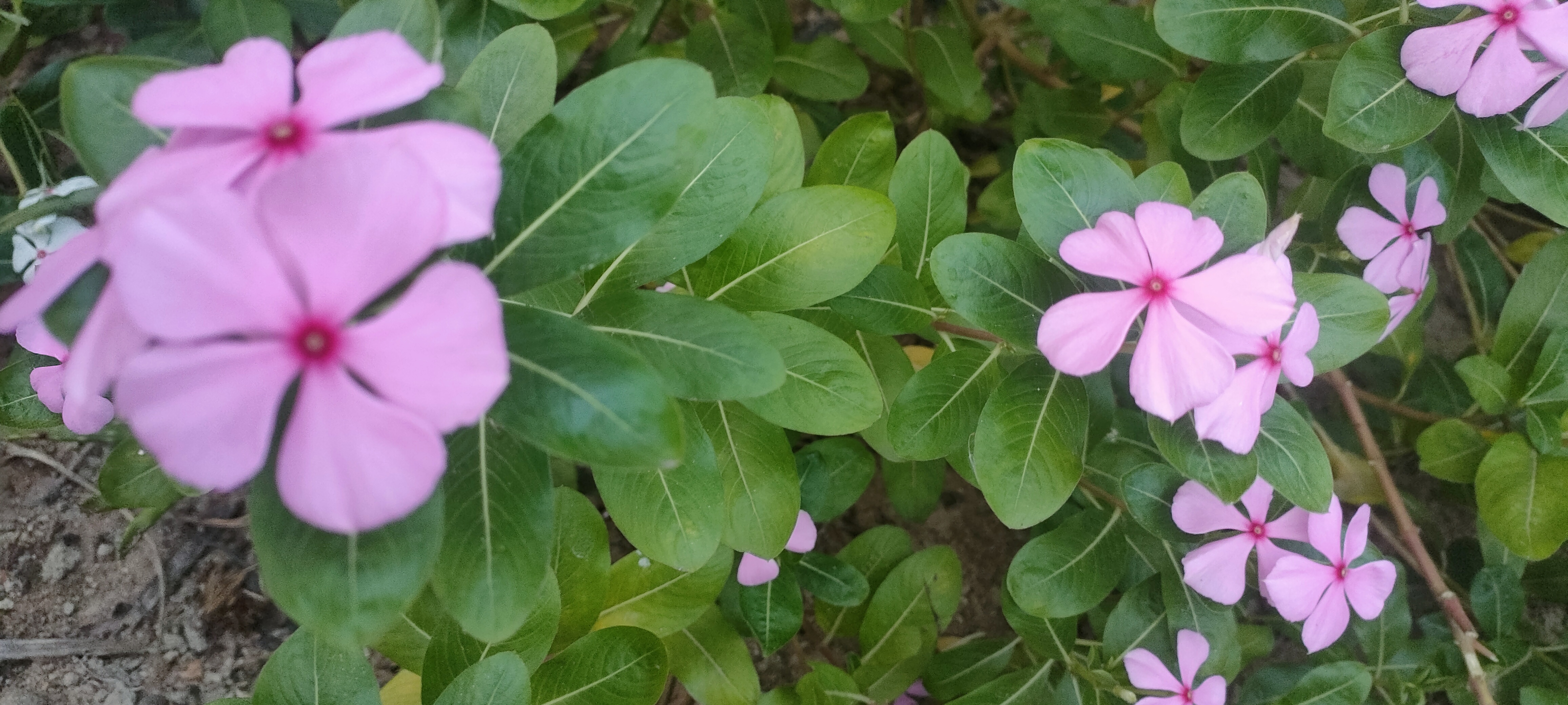
Pink form of Catharanthus roseus

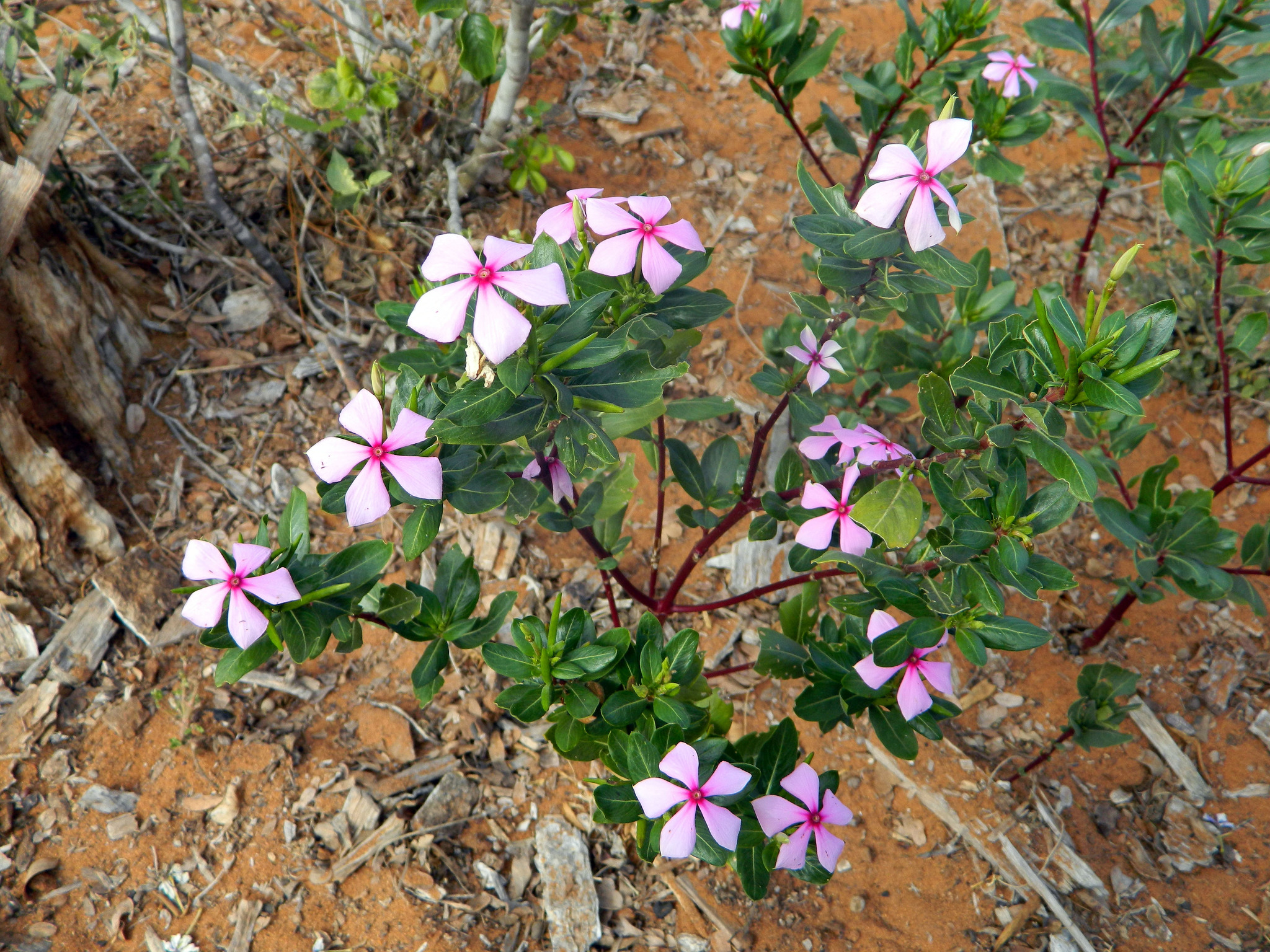
Catharanthus roseus in habitat in Ifaty

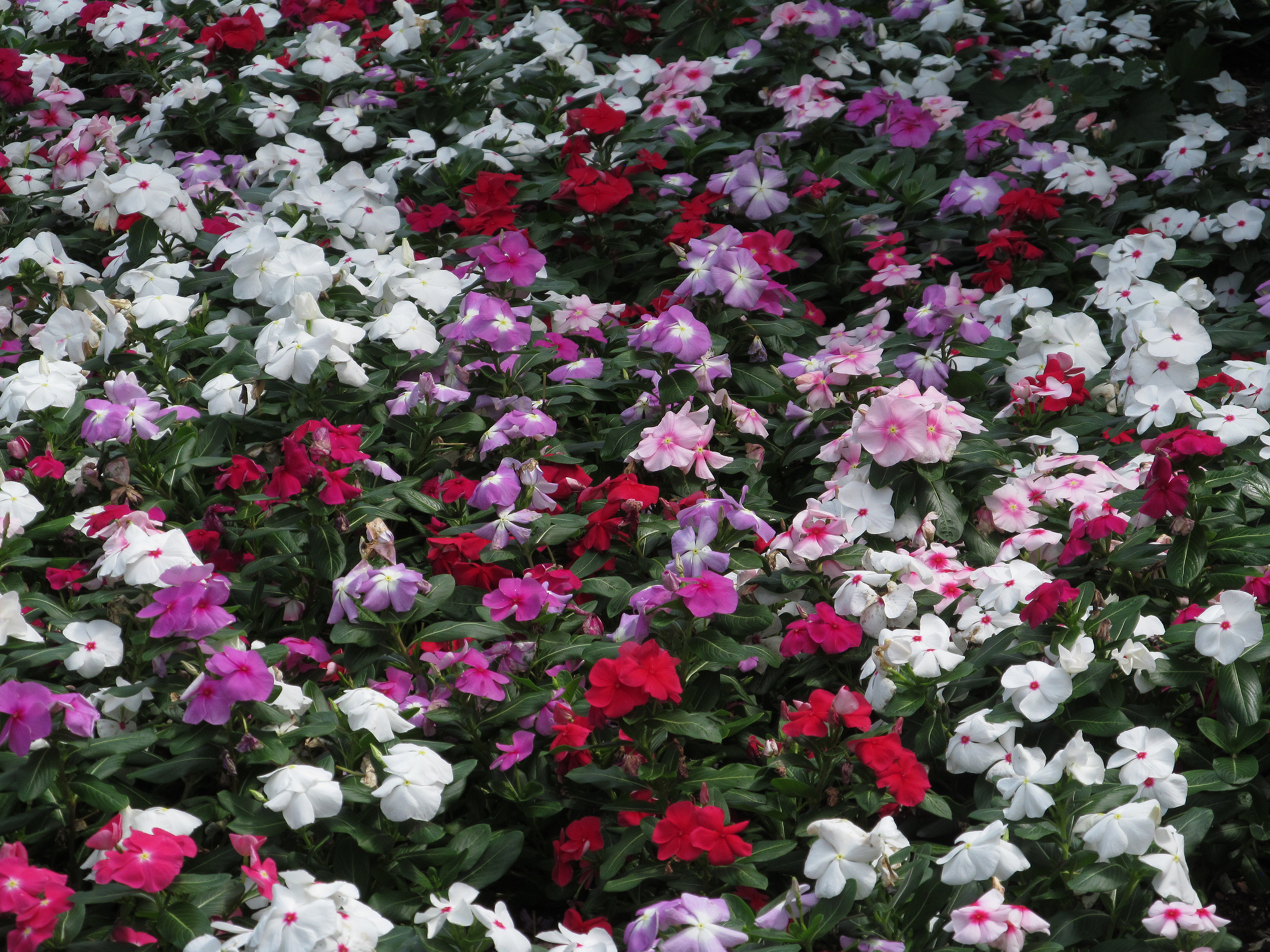
Catharanthus roseus flowerbed

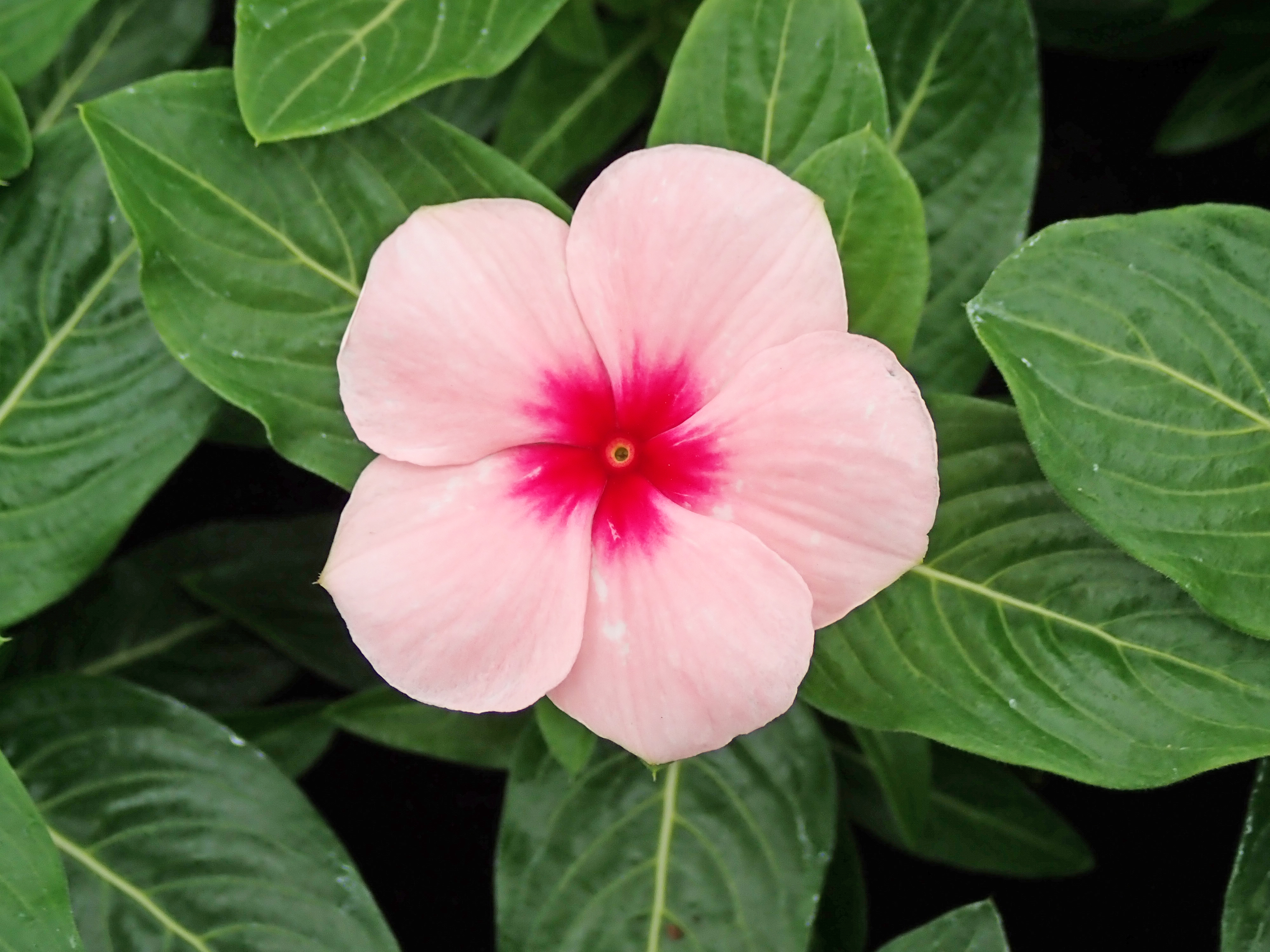
Light/dark pink form of Catharanthus roseus
