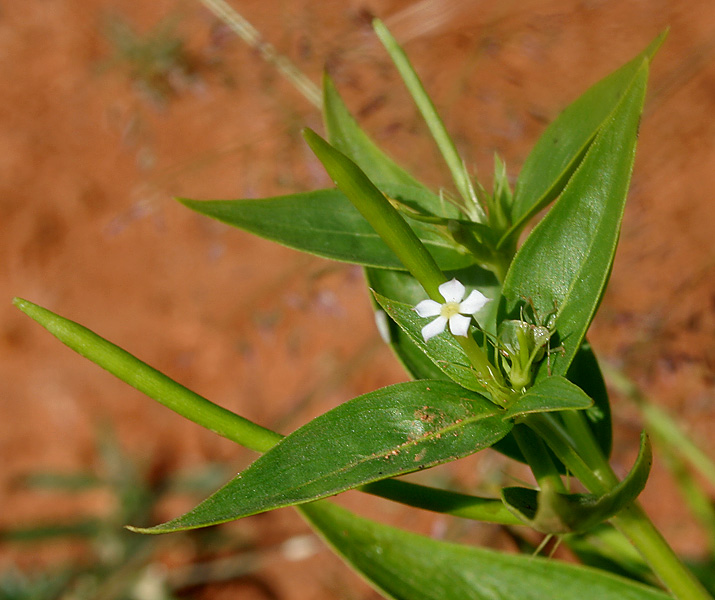

Scientific classification
- Kingdom: Plantae
- Clade: Tracheophytes
- Clade: Angiosperms
- Clade: Eudicots
- Clade: Asterids
- Order: Gentianales
- Family: Apocynaceae
- Genus: Catharanthus
- Species: C. pusillus

Binomial name
- Catharanthus pusillus (Murray) G. Don

= Catharanthus pusillus =

Species of plant

Catharanthus pusillus, commonly known as the tiny periwinkle, is a species of flowering plants in the family Apocynaceae. Unlike other species in the genus Catharanthus, which are native to Madagascar, C. pusillus is found in India and Sri Lanka. It can be referred to as sangkhi, ran-kel, or tiloni in Marathi, and many other names. It is the smallest of the genus, growing up to 20 cm tall, and is sometimes referred to as "tiny periwinkle". The corolla is white with a yellow eye and the corolla tube can grow up to 11 mm long.
