= Catharanthus makayensis =

Scientific classification
- Kingdom: Plantae
- Clade: Tracheophytes
- Clade: Angiosperms
- Clade: Eudicots
- Clade: Asterids
- Order: Gentianales
- Family: Apocynaceae
- Genus: Catharanthus
- Species: C. makayensis

Binomial name
- Catharanthus makayensis L.Allorge, Phillipson & Razakamal.

Species of plant

Catharanthus makayensis is a species of flowering plant in the family Apocynaceae, endemic to Madagascar. It was first described in 2015.

== Description ==
Catharanthus makayensis is a perennial herbaceous plant growing to 50–60 cm (20–24 in) tall. Its stems differ from all other known species of the genus Catharanthus in being hexagonal in cross-section. The opposite leaves are shortly petiolate, with a leaf blade 32–38 mm (1.3–1.5 in) long and 12–15 mm (0.5–0.6 in) across. The inflorescence usually consists of two flowers, occasionally only one. The flowers are erect on a short pedicel 1–2 mm (0.04–0.08 in) long, and are white with a magenta eye. The calyx has narrow recurved sepals 5–6 mm (0.20–0.24 in) long, which differ in shape from all other known species of the genus. The petals are joined at the base into a very narrow tube, 28–30 mm (1.1–1.2 in) long and 0.8 mm (0.03 in) in diameter. The petal lobes are highly asymmetrical, about 2 cm (0.8 in) long and 1 cm (0.4 in) across. The fruit consists of follicles containing 3–4 brown seeds.

== Distribution and habitat ==
Catharanthus makayensis is endemic to Madagascar. When first described in 2015, it was known only from two locations about 20 km (12 miles) apart in the Makay Massif. Plants were growing in sandy ground on riverbanks, and in moist areas among rocks, at elevations of 400–600 m (1,300–2,000 ft).
