= Catharanthus coriaceus =

Scientific classification
- Kingdom: Plantae
- Clade: Tracheophytes
- Clade: Angiosperms
- Clade: Eudicots
- Clade: Asterids
- Order: Gentianales
- Family: Apocynaceae
- Genus: Catharanthus
- Species: C. coriaceus

Binomial name
- Catharanthus coriaceus Markgr.

Species of plant

Catharanthus coriaceus is a species of flowering plant in the dogbane family, Apocynaceae. It is endemic to Madagascar.

C. coriaceus is typically found in the northern areas or the central plateau of Madagascar, preferring a dry, rocky environment. The plants are relatively small at full growth (hardly ever more than 30 cm tall). The one-flowered plant has leaves that are 30 mm long or less but are longer than the internodes. The follicles are erect or pedunculate, and the corolla is pink.
