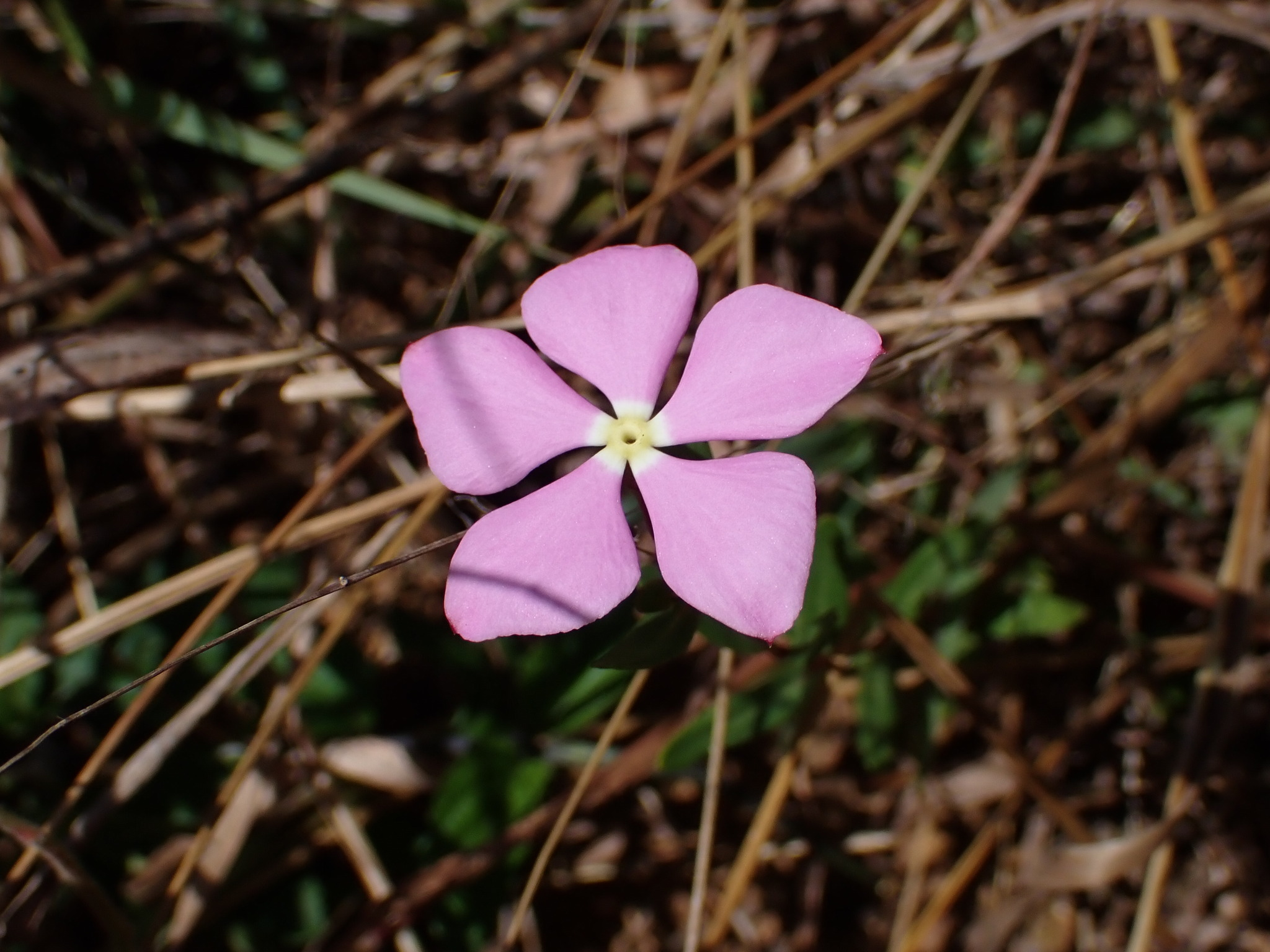

Scientific classification
- Kingdom: Plantae
- Clade: Tracheophytes
- Clade: Angiosperms
- Clade: Eudicots
- Clade: Asterids
- Order: Gentianales
- Family: Apocynaceae
- Genus: Catharanthus
- Species: C. lanceus

Binomial name
- Catharanthus lanceus (Bojer ex A.DC.) Pichon

Synonyms
- Lochnera lancea (Bojer ex A.DC.) K.Schum; Vinca lancea Bojer ex A.DC.

= Catharanthus lanceus =

Species of plant

Catharanthus lanceus, the lance-leaf periwinkle, grows as a perennial herb up to 1 metre (3 ft) tall. Its fragrant flowers feature white or cream corolla lobes turning pink, reddish-violet or pink-magenta. Its habitat is on volcanic or burned soil, hillside rocks and in open woodland on ridges. Catharanthus lanceus is found from 750–2,000 metres (2,500–6,600 ft) altitude. The plant is used in local medicinal treatments for toothache, fever and skin diseases, and also as a diuretic. The species is endemic to Madagascar.

Two alkaloids have been isolated from the root: lanceine and vinosidine.
