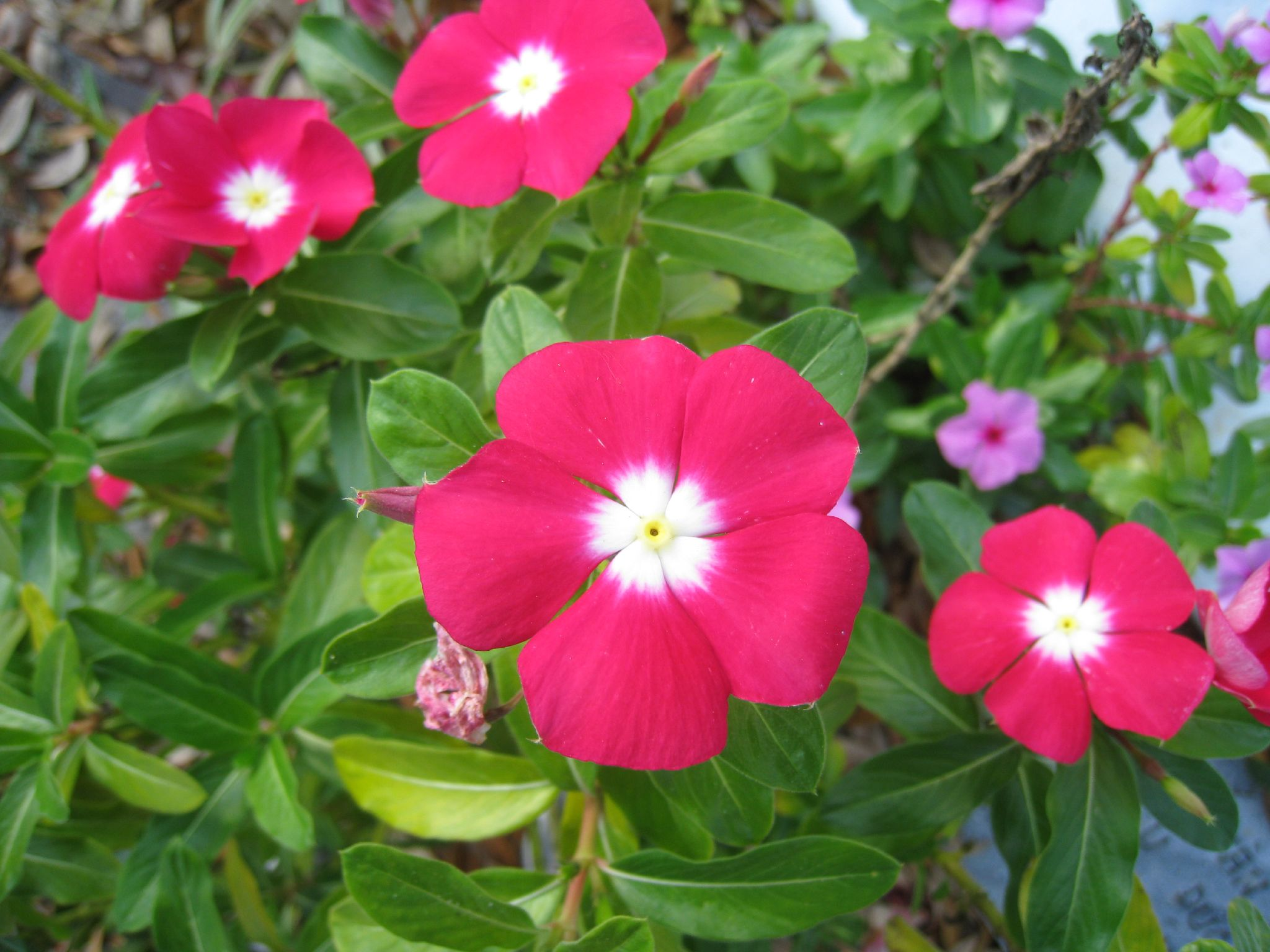
- Catharanthus ovalis

Scientific classification
- Kingdom: Plantae
- Clade: Tracheophytes
- Clade: Angiosperms
- Clade: Eudicots
- Clade: Asterids
- Order: Gentianales
- Family: Apocynaceae
- Genus: Catharanthus
- Species: C. ovalis

Binomial name
- Catharanthus ovalis Markgr.

Synonyms
- Heterotypic Synonyms: Catharanthus ovalis subsp. grandiflorus Markgr.; Catharanthus ovalis var. tomentellus Markgr.

= Catharanthus ovalis =

Species of plant

Catharanthus ovalis is a species of flowering plant in the dogbane family, Apocynaceae. It is endemic to Madagascar.

First published as a species in 1970, several subspecies or varieties have been proposed, however none are now recognized.

C. ovalis is found in the southern areas of the Central Plateau and the southwest of Madagascar. The plant has hairless (glabrous) stems, and leaves with an oval shape. The leaves are sessile (petiole less than 1 mm long) and the corolla has a white or yellow eye and pink lobes.
