= Obconic =

Inverted cone shape in botany

In botany, the term obconic refers to an inverted cone shape. The term is most frequently applied to certain fruit or hypanthium structures with the apical end attached to the stem; however, less frequently the usage may apply to the pistil structure. In the case of fungi the designation is often made to the ascospore. The use of obconic in botany dates to at least as early as the nineteenth century; however, some modern usage applies to an entire plant form, such as the shape of a whole shrub. More broadly, in geometry or design, the term can be assigned in an abstract manner to shapes in the natural or man-made world which show an inverted cone design.

== Botanical examples ==
The carnivorous plant Nepenthes deaniana has pitcher elements that are obconic in shape to capture insects. The hypanthium of one plant found in the western United States, Heuchera rubescens, has one subspecies with an obconic structure, while several other subspecies have alternative hypanthium geometries, so that the obconic characteristic is a subspecies determinant and diagnostic. The hypanthium of the Toyon shrub is also generally obconic in shape. The Asian tree Eriobotrya latifolia and several other species within the genus Eriobotrya have an obconic calyx, although some individuals manifest clavate calices. The basal portion of the pistil of Pachypodium baronii exhibits the obconic structural design.

As a fungal example the species Pocillum cesatii is noted to have an obconic ascospore.

== Etymology and historical usage ==
The derivation of the word obconic is based upon the Greek with the common prefix ob, meaning inverted, and the Greek word for angle gon or gonia, followed by the generic suffix ic. Historically botanists have used the designation obconic to describe elements of a plant such as the fruit, hypanthium, calyx or pistil base since at least as early as the nineteenth century, and in modern times the term has been generalized to also refer to an entire plant architectural shape.

== See also ==
- Conic
