= Marcel Pichon =

French botanist

Marcel Pichon (1921–1954) was a French botanist specialising in Apocynaceae.

== Publications ==
- 1948. Classification des apocynacées. 1. Carissées et ambelaniées
- 1948. Classification des apocynacées : . IX. Rauvolfiées, alstoniées, allamandées et tabernémontanoïdées
- 1950. Classification des apocynacées. 25. Échitoïdées et supplément aux pluméroïdées
- 1953. Monographie des landolphiées : Classification des apocynacées, XXXV
